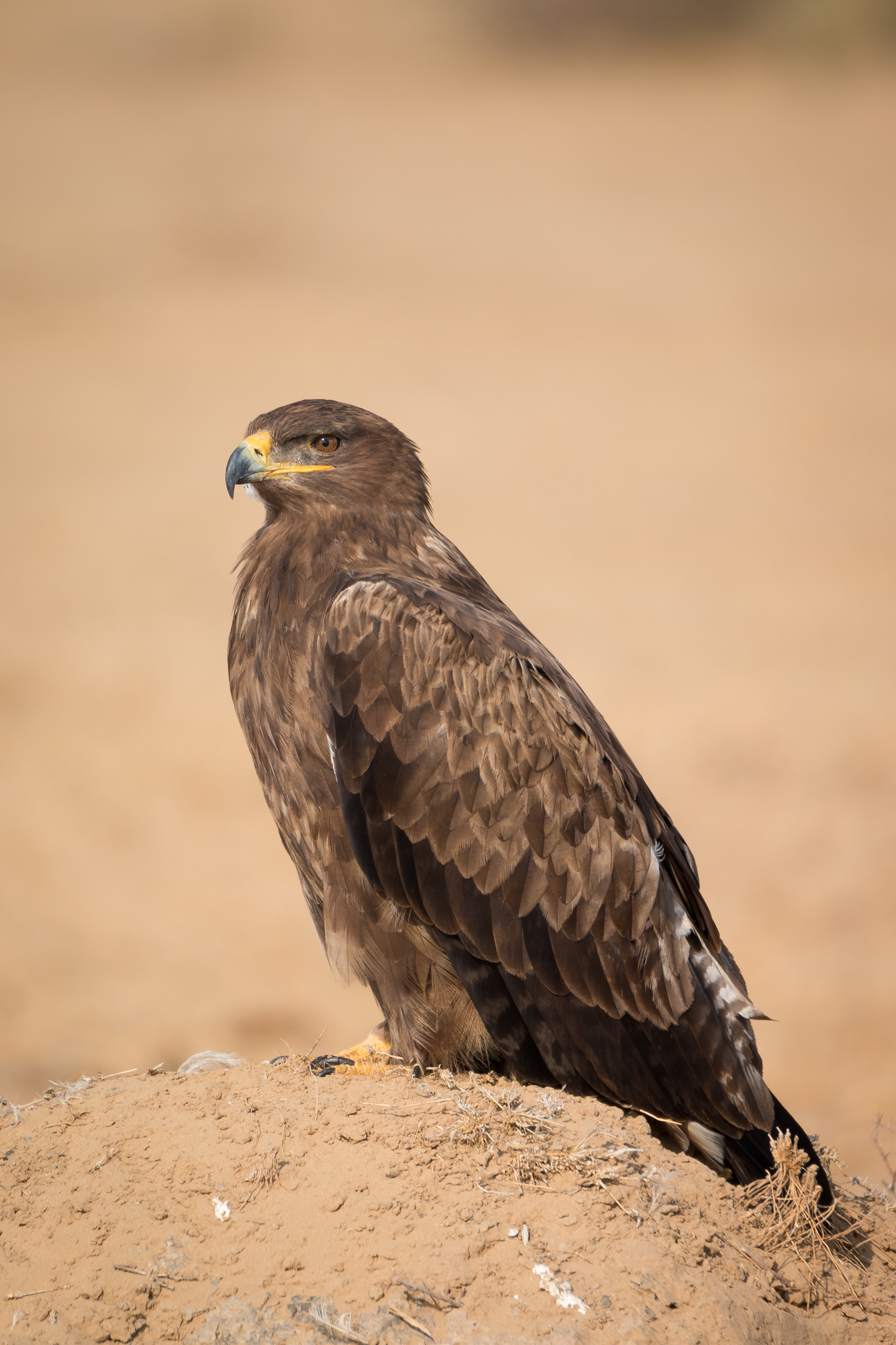
- Individual at Jorbeer, Bikaner, Rajasthan

Conservation status
- Endangered (IUCN 3.1)

Scientific classification
- Kingdom: Animalia
- Phylum: Chordata
- Class: Aves
- Order: Accipitriformes
- Family: Accipitridae
- Genus: Aquila
- Species: A. nipalensis

Binomial name
- Aquila nipalensis Hodgson, 1833

Subspecies
- A. n. orientalis - Cabanis, 1854; A. n. nipalensis - Hodgson, 1833
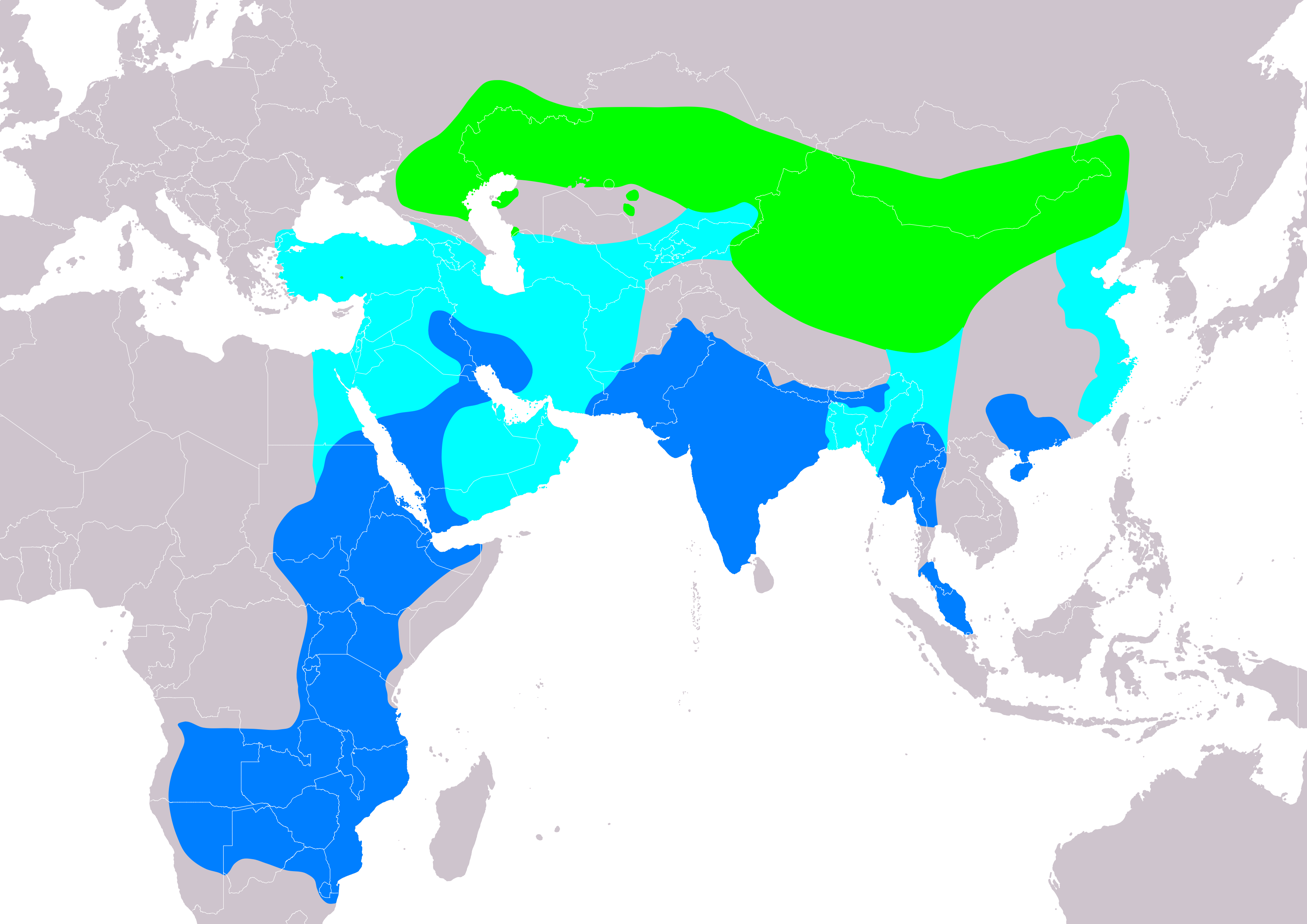
- Range of A. nipalensis Breeding Passage Non-breeding

Synonyms
- Aquila rapax nipalensis Falco mogilnik S.G. Gmelin, 1771 nomen dubium

= Steppe eagle =

Species of bird

The steppe eagle (Aquila nipalensis) is a large bird of prey. Like all eagles, it belongs to the family Accipitridae. The steppe eagle's well-feathered legs illustrate it to be a member of the subfamily Aquilinae, also known as the "Booted eagles". This species was once considered to be closely related to the sedentary tawny eagle (Aquila rapax) and the two forms have previously been treated as conspecific. They were split based on pronounced differences in morphology and anatomy; two molecular studies, each based on a very small number of genes, indicate that the species are distinct but disagree over how closely related they are.

The Steppe eagle is in many ways a peculiar species of eagle. It is a specialized predator of ground squirrels on the breeding ground, also taking other rather small mammals and other prey, doing so more often when ground squirrels are less consistently found. In rather treeless areas of the steppe habitats, these eagles tend to nest on a slight rise, often on or near an outcrop, but may even be found on flat, wide-open ground, in a rather flat nest. They are the only eagle to nest primarily on the ground. Usually, one to three eggs are laid and, in successful nests, one to two young eagles fledge. The steppe eagle undertakes a massive migration from essentially its entire breeding range, moving en masse past major migration flyways, especially those of the Middle East, Red Sea and the Himalayas. In winter, though less closely studied than during breeding, the steppe eagle is remarkable for its sluggish and almost passive feeding ecology, focusing on insect swarms, landfills, carrion and the semi-altricial young of assorted animals, lacking the bold and predatory demeanor of their cousin species. Although still seen by the thousands at migration sites in larger numbers than other migrating eagles of these areas, the steppe eagle's entire population has declined precipitously. The threats to this species consist of increasing steppe fires and pests around the nests (both probably increased by the warming climate) which can cause a large volume of nest failures. Rivaling these factors, declines are being exacerbated by disturbance and persecution by humans, as well as trampling of nests by livestock. Free-flying steppe eagles are also being killed in alarmingly large numbers, especially in the stronghold nation for breeding of Kazakhstan, by electrocutions on dangerous electricial wires and pylons. Due to these and other reasons, the decline of the species is thought to be considerably more than 50%. Therefore, the species is considered to be endangered by the IUCN. The steppe eagle appears on the flag of Kazakhstan and is the national bird of both Kazakhstan and Egypt.

== Taxonomy ==
British naturalist Brian Houghton Hodgson described the steppe eagle in 1833. Aquila is Latin for "eagle" while nipalensis means "from Nepal" based on the location where the type specimen was collected presumably while migrating. Samuel G. Gmelin however, described a species of eagle from Tanais where they were found sitting on ancient mounds or graves of nomads. He called it "Aquila mogilnik," the species name "mogilnik" meaning "burial" in Russian. This was included in the 13th edition of Systema Naturae by his cousin J.F. Gmelin in 1788. The identity of this bird was, however, confused with A. heliaca but research in 2019 suggests that A. mogilnik can reliably be identified and that it would have been a valid senior name for A. nipalensis had it not been declared as a nomen dubium, a doubtful name by Ernst Hartert in 1914. The lack of usage of the name in literature now makes the name nomen oblitum, a valid senior name lost by disuse. The steppe eagle is a member of the booted eagle subfamily within the Accipitridae family. The booted eagle clan are monophyletic and the study of karyotypes has indicated that they likely have few to no close external relations within the overall extant accipitrid family. The booted eagle subfamily all have feathers covering their legs and may be found to some extent on every continent that contains accipitrids. The genus Aquila traditionally comprises large and fairly dark eagles that tend to live in open habitats. However, a significant division was determined to exist between superficially similar eagles such as the golden eagle (Aquila chrysaetos) and its three extant and similar-looking close cousins, as well as three very different smaller and pale-bellied eagles (the Bonelli's, African hawk- and Cassin's hawk-eagles) and the species complex which contains the steppe eagle. There is a similar genetic disparity with the golden eagle for the steppe eagle as with the spotted eagles which have been deemed distinct enough to form a separate genus, Clanga. The steppe eagle genetically clusters closely to the tawny eagle as well as, albeit more distantly, with the eastern (Aquila heliaca) and Spanish imperial eagles (Aquila adalberti). However, the loci evidenced in the Aquila genera have been found to be relatively homogenous, with general studies of isoenzymes showing their genes as about ten times less distanced than certain owl genera.

The steppe eagle has historically been considered conspecific with the tawny eagle, even until as recently as 1991. The latter species resides year-round in the African and Asian areas, often used seasonally as wintering grounds by the steppe eagle. The species were ultimately separated on the grounds of the differences in morphology, disparate coloring, distinct life histories, and behaviours. Testing of genetic materials has reinforced the species distinction of the steppe and tawny eagles. Genetically, the steppe eagle is thought to be basal to related species such as the tawny and imperial eagles. A fossil species, Aquila nipaloides, has been found in Italy, Corsica, Sardinia and France and was hypothesized to most closely related to the steppe eagle based on osteology of the ramus (although did evidence some differences in leg morphology). Despite being even more strongly distinctive from the steppe eagle than the tawny eagle, the eastern imperial eagle has been seen to hybridize with the steppe eagles in the wild, once in Turkey and at least three times in Kazakhstan. Each hybrid with imperial eagles has been known to involve pairs of subadult or juvenile eagles and all known hybrid pairings were between male steppe eagles (or apparent steppe-imperial hybrids themselves) mated to female imperial eagles. Some of these hybrid pairs also produced seemingly healthy young with roughly intermediate characteristics.

The Steppe eagle has been generally considered to contain two subspecies. One was the nominate subspecies, A. n. nipalensis, which breeds in the eastern portions of the range (perhaps from the East Kazakhstan Region to all points east) while the western breeding population, found in most of Kazakhstan and European Russia, was considered as the subspecies, A. n. orientalis. The separation of the two subspecies was largely based on size, with the eastern population being larger and much heavier than the western eagles. The more eastern birds tend to be a shade darker and a have a more extensive nape patch, as well as having a more conspicuously deep gape-line. However, both western and Russian researchers have since made a convincing advocacy that the steppe eagle is actually a monotypical species. It was found that both previously claimed subspecies appear to broadly overlap in the breeding range and become indistinguishable at the Kazakh-Russian meeting point. The primary differences, i.e. in size and mildly in color, can be explained as clinal variations due to the environment. The breeding populations of the eastern and western eagles are insufficiently allopatric and too extensively engage in introgression to be properly regarded as full subspecies. Erroneously, a checklist once included the former subspecies of A. n. orientalis as being part of the subspecies of tawny eagle from Asia, A. r. vindhiana, an error that was later corrected.

== Description ==
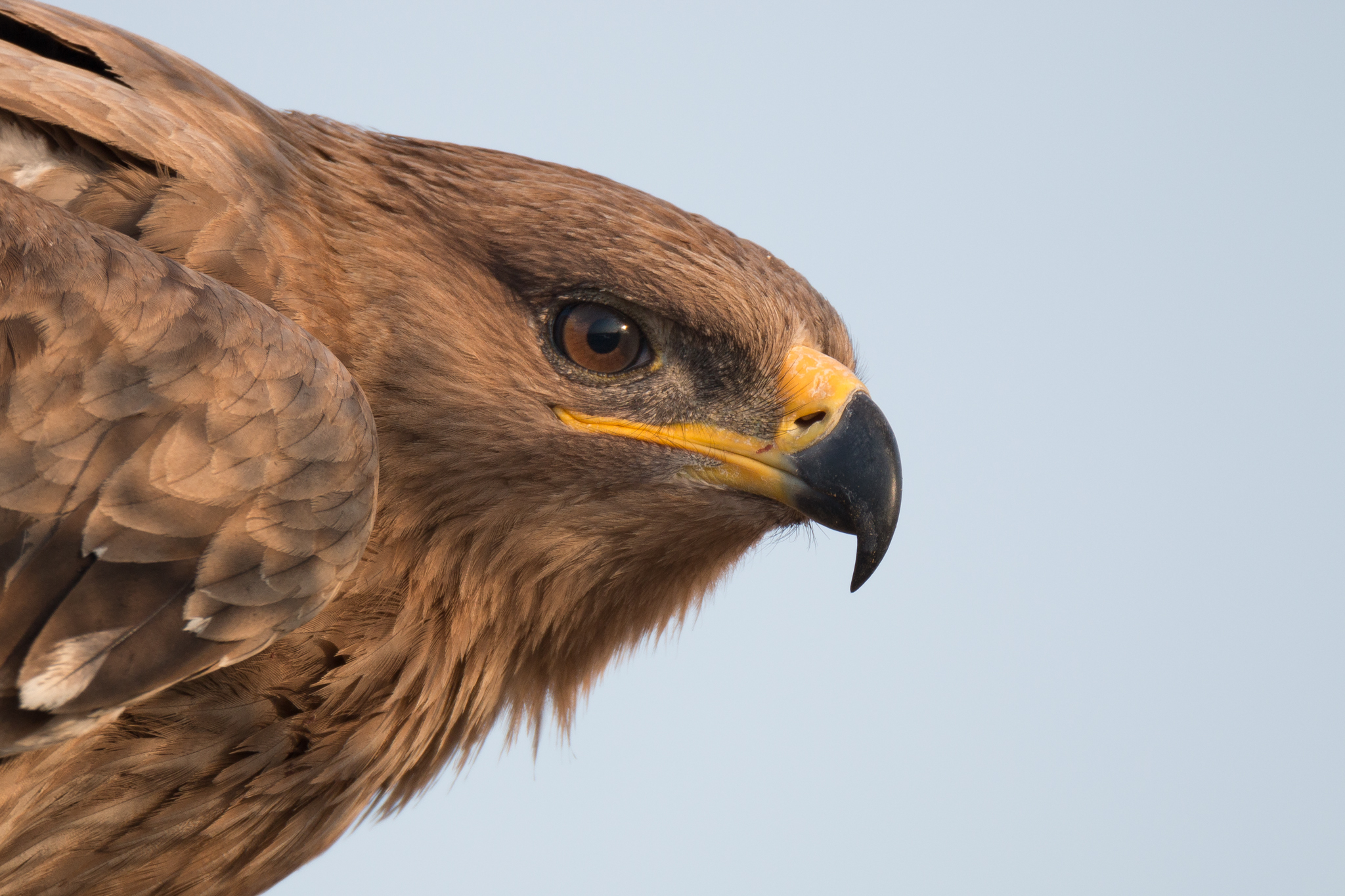
The gape of the steppe eagle is an easy way to distinguish it from the tawny eagle. The gape extends beyond the center of the eye as against the tawny. The oval nostril sets it apart from the spotted eagles.

The steppe eagle is a large, bulky and robust-looking eagle. It is mainly dark brown in color with a longish but very thick neck and a relatively small head that nonetheless features a strong bill and long gape-line. It appears long-winged and has a longish and rather rounded tail and markedly well-feathered (almost with disheveled looking feathers) legs. Steppe eagles tend to perch somewhat upright and usually do so in the open, often utilizing isolated trees, posts, rocks or other suitable low lookouts such as mounds or straw-piles. The species often is seen on the ground where may stand for long periods of the day and walk with horizontal posture and with wingtips just exceed the tail-tip. Steppe eagles, like tawny eagles, can be relatively tame and approachable, at least compared to many of the other Aquila eagles. The adult is a somewhat variable brown with darker centers to the greater coverts. More pronouncedly in the eastern part of the range, adults have normally prominent pale rufous to dull orange-yellow to yellow-brown patches on the nape and hindcrown. Any other paler areas (such as the feather tips of the back and uppertail coverts) are obscured on perched adults. The massive gape-line runs to level with the rear of eye (further emphasized by dark border against paler chin) and is longer than in any other Aquila eagles including tawny eagles. Combined with their deep-set eyes, it lends steppe eagles an altogether rather fierce facial expression. Steppe eagle juveniles are almost invariably paler than adults, with some ranging overall from umber-brown to tawny-buff but then some are darker and more deeply brown. Juveniles tend to be brown to grey-brown on the upperparts but for generally rufous-buff nape patch (more so on the eastern population). The juveniles bear conspicuously and broadly white-tipped black about the greater coverts, wings and tail and a bold but narrow cream band on the brown medians. The juvenile steppe eagle's white uppertail coverts is generally concealed when perched; the underparts are usually the same as the upperparts but may be somewhat paler tawny-buff hue. Upon their 2nd year, the plumage is still much as the 1st year appearance but show the pale tips to secondaries, median coverts and tail as often well-worn and narrower; by the start of 2nd winter the, tips of retained juvenile flight-feathers and coverts are heavily abraded and very thin. By the end of 2nd winter, often the immatures look very worn and have nearly lost pale tips altogether and from 3rd year onward manifest a variable mix of old and new feathers. Generally, immatures are often rather scruffy in appearance until adult-like plumage attained at year five, after which the feathers generally appear more compact. Adults have brown to hazel eyes, while juveniles have distinctly dark brown eyes; the cere and feet are yellow at all ages.

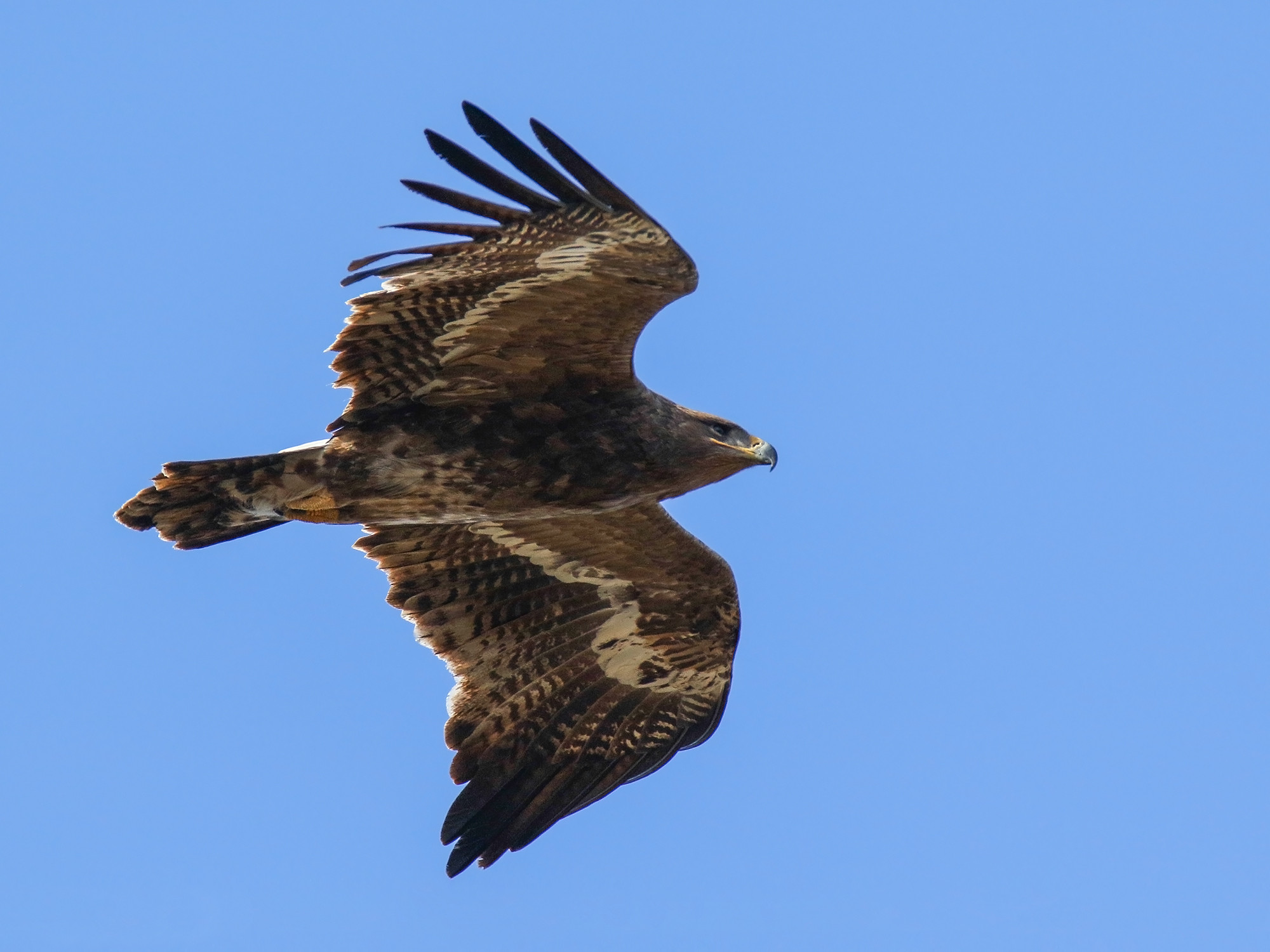
Detailed view of a young steppe eagle in flight in Pakistan.

In flight, the steppe eagle appears as a large, impressive and visibly heavy raptor with a well-projecting large head and bill and rather broad neck and long, broad wings. They evidence proportionately long arms, especially in the larger eastern birds. The wings tend to be held almost parallel-edged and square-ended with 7 very elongated emarginations. Often juveniles can tend to appear somewhat narrower winged. The broad body of the species often looks suspended underneath and the tail appears rounded or even wedge-shaped, measuring about 3/4 of the length of wing-base. The wingspan is about 2.6 times greater than the total body length. On the upperwings, steppe eagles show a pale greyish primary patch that is often quite large and obvious (especially on non-adults), often being pale at the base on the greater primary coverts but on adults (especially dark birds) much less marked. On the underwing, a very small carpal crescent may be present but can vary from invisible to slightly more marked. The flight feathers are greyish and all have 7–8 well-spaced blackish bars (albeit less conspicuously than on spotted eagles), while the fingers are plain blackish. Adults are basically all fairly uniform dark brown (wings can be negligibly greyer or rarely yellowish brown). Adults may evidence in flight some whitish patches on back and tail coverts that are varying from insignificant to fairly prominent. Adult eagles that do show a dark-barred greyish primary patch usually have that confined to a wedge-shape on inner primaries though can sometimes be rather more prominent. Below adults show dark-barred grey flight feathers and tail with the broad blackish trail edges and wing ends being rather distinctive; the wing linings are often slightly paler to darker than remiges and often with an obscure remnant of broken paler central band. Juveniles are quite distinctive in flight if seen in reasonable view. Above, juveniles are pale greyish-brown to yellow-brown about the body and forewing-coverts, have a broad whitish U above the tail. They possess broad white tips to the blackish greater coverts, flights feathers and tail creating obvious whitish bars on the wings and trailing edges as well as a large and prominent whitish patch covering much of the inner primaries (causing barring to stand out more so and offsetting plain black wing end). On its underside, the juvenile is mid-brown to brownish-yellow with a paler throat and creamy crissum. Below, the creamy central wing band is even broader than above, while the greater coverts all white with some dark centres on primaries (rare extreme pale individuals appear to have almost uniform paler colour on the entire wing lining and lesser and medians buffish-white to pale sandy, often whitish pale primary-wedges). Despite reports that some juvenile 1st years have subtle or no central wing bands, these are believed to be cases where these feathers exist but are obscured by long median coverts. At the end of the first year, the young steppe eagle tends to have pale tips to wings, tail and upperwing coverts become rather abraded; thereafter the development young evidence much variation due to individual differences. Usually, by the end of 2nd winter, the wing looks even more worn and uneven in pattern, with any newly acquired narrowly white-tipped quills clearly longer than old worn juvenile ones that have lost their pale tips. From the 3rd winter on, the pale parts clearly reduced, flight feathers and tail often appear quite ragged and by the 4th year start to more resemble adults. From the end of the 3rd year to when they obtain adult plumage, the eagles tend to have adult-like broad blackish trailing edges and tail often coupled with dark-barred grey base to black fingers and traces of the pale band along greater underwing-coverts. Maturity is obtained between the 4th and 5th years, not at 6–7 years as previously reported despite some presumed five-year-old eagles still have flecks of pale on the wing coverts and the throat and more subtle nape patches than they will ultimately manifest.

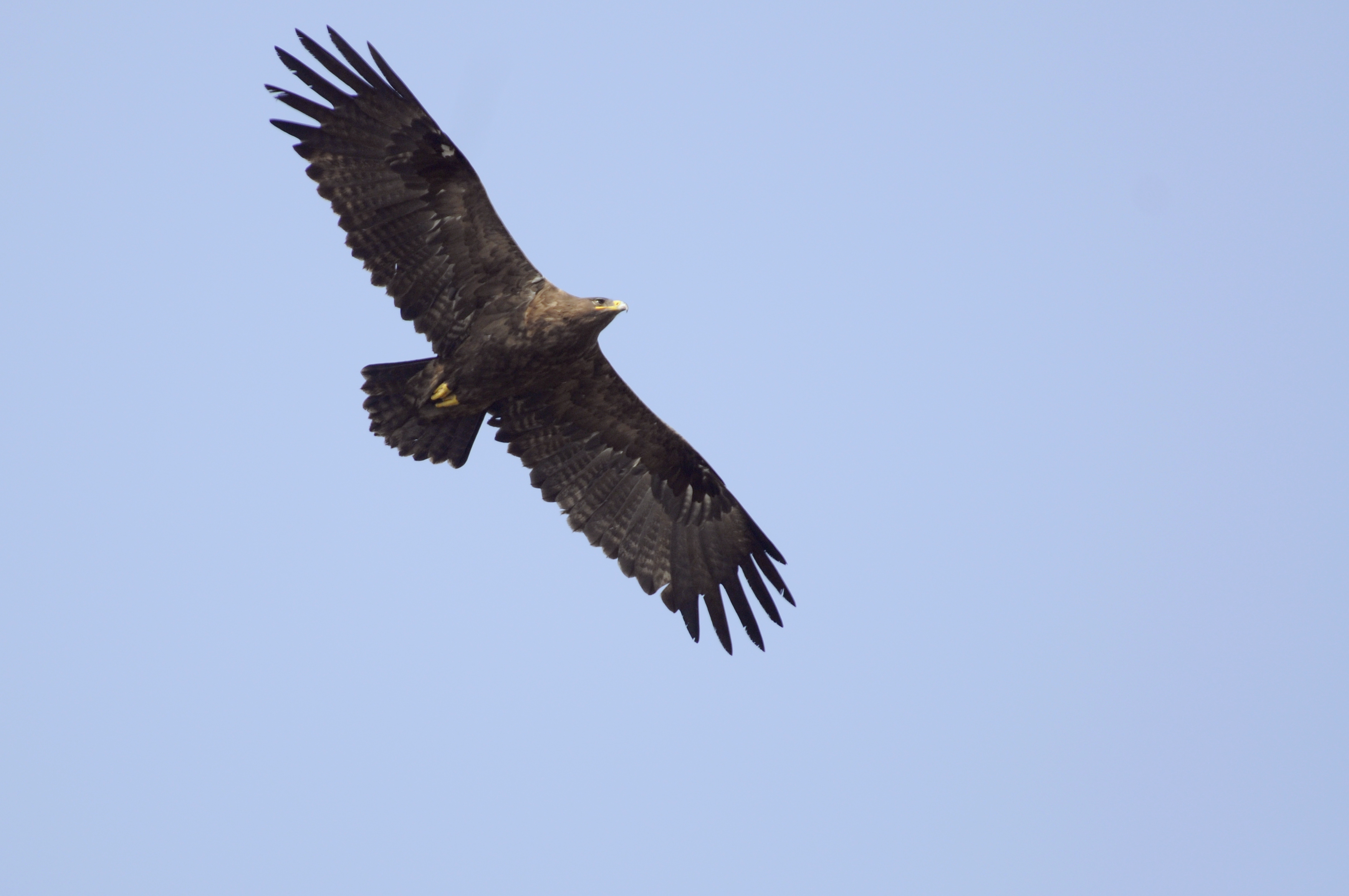
Adult steppe eagle in flight, Aravalli Biodiversity Park, Gurgaon

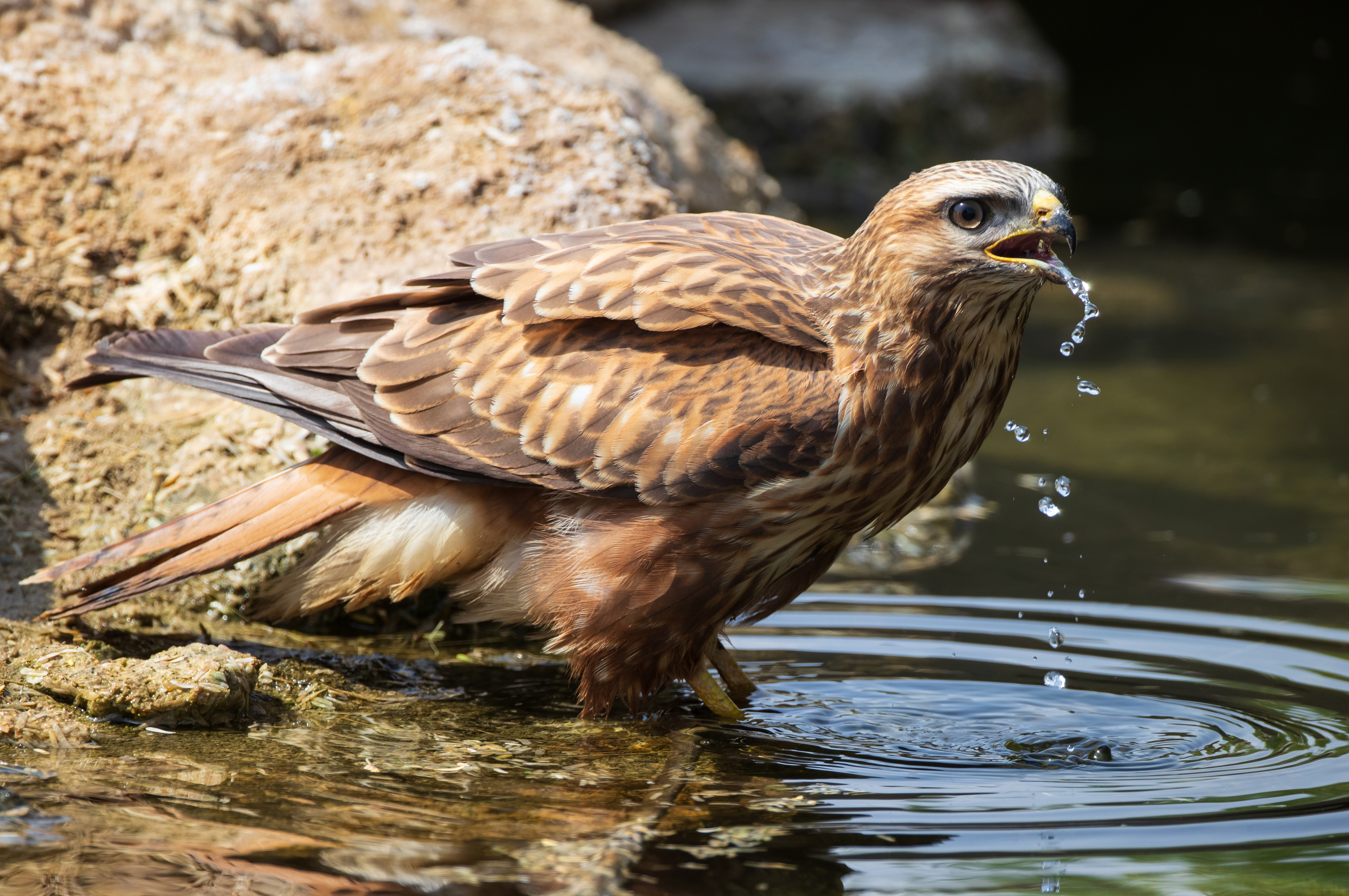
A steppe eagle drinking water at the Sheikh Sabah Reserve in Kuwait.

=== Size ===
The steppe eagle is a large and impressive raptor and quite a large eagle. However, as a member of the genus Aquila, it is fairly medium-sized. Females can range to 15% larger with greater dimorphism by weight, which is more pronouncedly dimorphic than by linear dimensions. Total length can range from 60 to 89 cm (24 to 35 in) in fully-grown steppe eagles. Wingspan in full grown eagles of this species is very variable, with the smallest steppe eagles spanning as little as 165 to 174 cm (5 ft 5 in to 5 ft 9 in) while the largest ones can reportedly span up to 250 to 262 cm (8 ft 2 in to 8 ft 7 in). Although some sources list the maximum wingspan as only 214 or 216 cm (7 ft 0 in or 7 ft 1 in), the maximum wing dimensions were apparently confirmed for the most massive steppe eagles (i.e. from Altai). Body mass, like wingspan, as reported is also fairly variable. Steppe eagles weighed for a Russia handbook were found to scale from 2.5 to 3.5 kg (5.5 to 7.7 lb) in males while in females weights reported to range from 2.3 to 4.9 kg (5.1 to 10.8 lb). Elsewhere, the minimum full-grown weights for smaller western eagles (formerly subspecies A. n. orientalis) were 2 kg (4.4 lb) for the smallest males while the heaviest females were found to have attained a weight around 3.9 kg (8.6 lb), while weights in the eastern part of the breeding range are around 20% heavier. In one sample of steppe eagles of possibly varied origins, males weighed a mean of 2.48 kg (5.5 lb) and females a mean of 3.56 kg (7.8 lb). Wintering eagles of the species in southern Africa weighed a mean of 3.02 kg (6.7 lb) in a sample of four. In Saudi Arabia, 21 steppe eagles at one study site weighed a mean of 3.28 kg (7.2 lb) while 27 eagles at another study site there weighed a mean of 3.45 kg (7.6 lb). Unpublished weights from Israel were much lower at a reported mean of 2.11 kg (4.7 lb), as in other raptors during passage migration in Israel, weight loss may be significant relative to the other seasons. Steppe eagles diagnosed as from the smaller-bodied, western part of the breeding range weighed a mean of 2.46 kg (5.4 lb) in 13 males and a mean of just under 3 kg (6.6 lb) in a sample of 18 females while the mean weight of larger, eastern breeding bird was listed as 3.01 kg (6.6 lb) in 2 males and 3.57 kg (7.9 lb) in 2 females. The maximum cited weight for steppe eagle males in the wild is 4.6 kg (10 lb) while that for females is 5.5 kg (12 lb). Among standard measurements, the wing chord can measure from 510 to 610 mm (20 to 24 in) in males and from 536 to 640 mm (21.1 to 25.2 in) in females. The tail may measure from 238 to 295 mm (9.4 to 11.6 in) in both sexes and the tarsus may be from 85 to 96 mm (3.3 to 3.8 in) in males and from 92 to 98 mm (3.6 to 3.9 in) in females, both fairly short for the size of the eagle (although its cousin fossil speciea, A. nipaloides, was apparently even shorter legged). Wing chord length averaged 536 mm (21.1 in) and 566 mm (22.3 in) in males and females in a study, respectively. The huge gape of a steppe eagle is from 49 to 60.8 mm (1.93 to 2.39 in) wide, with an average of 53.1 and 55.3 mm (2.09 and 2.18 in) in males and females, respectively, while the gape length is 40 to 49.7 mm (1.57 to 1.96 in), averaging 44.3 and 45.8 mm (1.74 and 1.80 in) in the two sexes. The hallux claw, the enlarged killing talon on the rear foot of essentially all accipitrids measures from 28.3 to 36.8 mm (1.11 to 1.45 in), averaging 33.8 mm (1.33 in), in males from 31.8 to 40.5 mm (1.25 to 1.59 in), averaging 36 mm (1.4 in), in females. As in the tawny eagle and imperial eagles, the talon size is modest, whereas most species in the golden eagle clade are markedly larger clawed relative to their size.

=== Confusion species ===
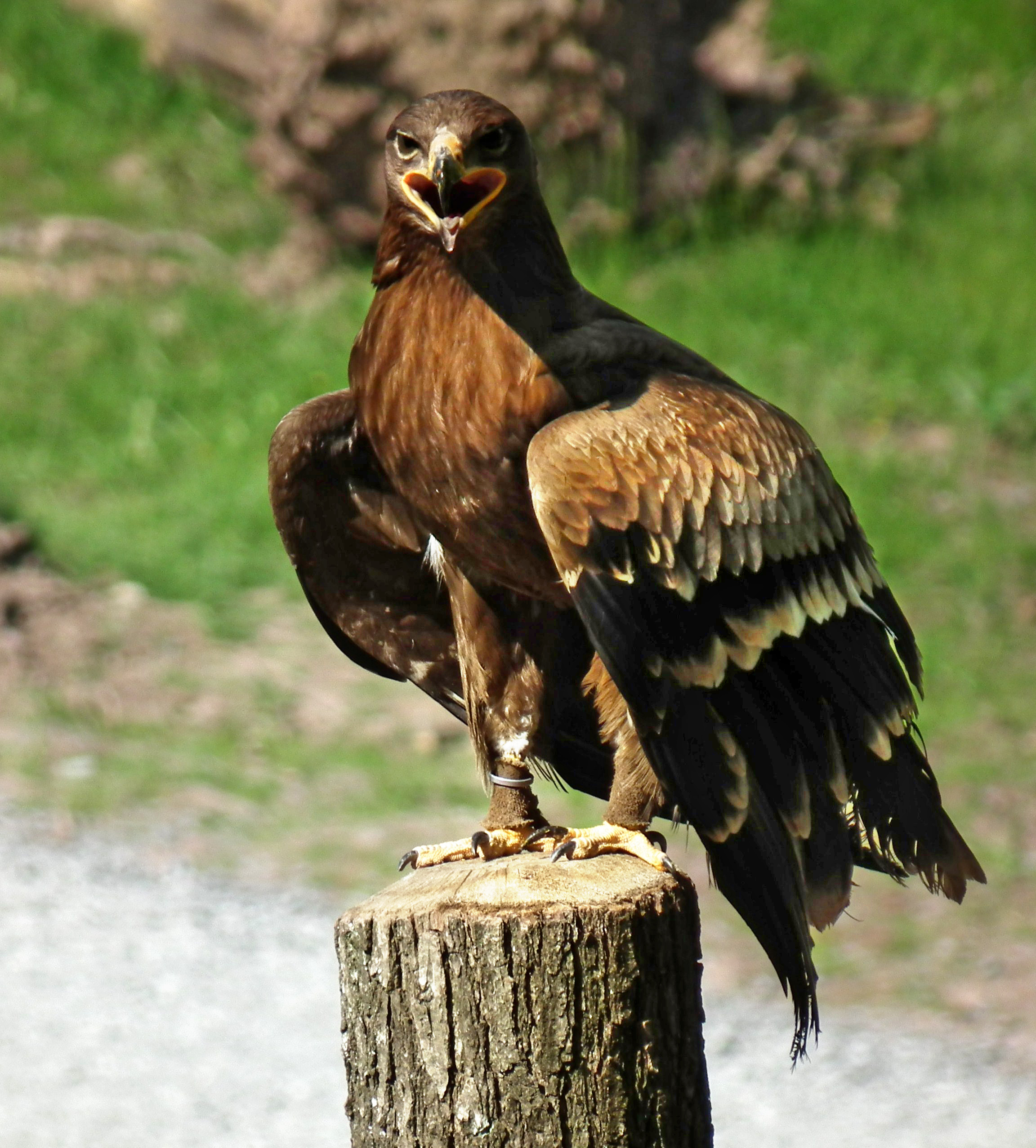
A young captive steppe eagle in Wildpark Tripsdrill, Germany, displaying several typical features including the distinctive pale bands about the wings and huge gape.

In many circumstances, the steppe eagle can be very difficult to distinguish from other similar eagles, often especially during passage and winter. Adults are often confused with spotted eagles but are best separated by their much more broad build, far greater wing areas with longer, more rectangular or squarish wing tips and longer, more conspicuous fingers, larger head (rather than small and bull-headed) and larger overall size. Compared to the spotted eagles, the flight of the steppe eagle is more aquiline, i.e. more powerful, labored and deep while spotted eagles tend to fly more like buzzards. The lesser spotted eagle (Clanga pomarina), the most similarly marked of spotted eagles, is particularly less powerful looking with a shorter neck, much smaller wing areas, shorter fingers and tail and less extensive, baggy leg-feathering. The greater spotted eagle (Clanga clanga) is also smaller and slighter but to a reduced extent. When plumage is clear to see, steppe eagles have more clearly and more extensively barred quills and lack the clear carpal arcs of the two widespread spotted eagles but these differences are obscured at greater distances. Some subadult steppe eagles, with their paler brown wing-coverts above and below and only traces of white underwing bands and clearly pale primary patch above in particular quite resemble the plumage of older lesser spotted eagles. The white wing bars of steppe eagles are usually more conspicuous than those of the lesser spotted eagle. At close range, the steppe eagle has a deeper gape than lesser and greater spotted eagles and has rounded rather than oval nostrils. When seen perched, either on a perch or on the ground, spotted eagles of all three species tend to stand quite tall and upright, emphasizing their more slender and lightly feathered legs, while the steppe eagle sits more horizontally and is always far bulkier than even the biggest greater spotted eagles. Some particularly dark adult and subadult steppe eagles with obscured paler wing feathers can greatly resemble adult greater spotted eagles (the latter species can appear almost blackish in certain lights) and would need to be identified by the differences in size and form. The Indian spotted eagle (Clanga hastata) has a deep gape reminiscent of the steppe eagle but is much slighter in overall size, being similar in size or even smaller than a lesser spotted eagle, and has even less conspicuous whitish wing markings than the lesser spotted. As a result of their rough similarities, many young steppe eagles are misidentified, particularly from a distance, with spotted eagles although generally, identification is possible via a combination of structure and plumage features. Juvenile steppe eagles are normally readily identified by distinctive plumage features but can recall juvenile eastern imperial eagles, the latter has a longer and less rounded tail, a more prominent (rather than deeply set) bill, has a much paler and more buff overall colour while the chest is overlaid with brown streaking and the quills are unbarred. Imperial and steppe eagles are often similar in size, with more western breeding birds usually being somewhat smaller when seen side by side with an imperial eagle and the eastern steppe eagles being of similar average size (but even larger maximum size) compared to full-grown imperial eagles. Steppe eagles are told from tawny eagles by that species being smaller and less bulky with shorter wings, a smaller gape, a more slender neck and a relatively longer tail. Both the tawny and steppe eagle tend to have a distinct S-shape curvature to the trailing edge of the wings. When perched on the ground, the tawny eagle tends to stand more upright, while the steppe eagle often appears to assume a more elongated, horizontal posture. Plumage variations of tawny eagles can render them a surprisingly close colour to the usually darker, duller and browner steppe eagle (especially so in south Asia), but they never obtain the distinct whitish wing band of the young steppe eagle nor the nape patch of most adult steppes. Despite slight individual and clinal variations, the steppe eagle, unlike the tawny eagle, is not polymorphic. These aforementioned eagles present the main possibilities for confusion, less likely mistakes can potentially range from relatively dainty and much smaller Wahlberg's eagles (Hieraeetus wahlbergi) (generally quite different in features but somewhat similarly hued) in Africa to the somewhat bigger but differently structured golden eagles (much longer tail, relatively smaller bill and much smaller gape, different wing shape, more aquiline build and bigger feet and talons) in much of the range.

== Distribution ==
=== Breeding range ===
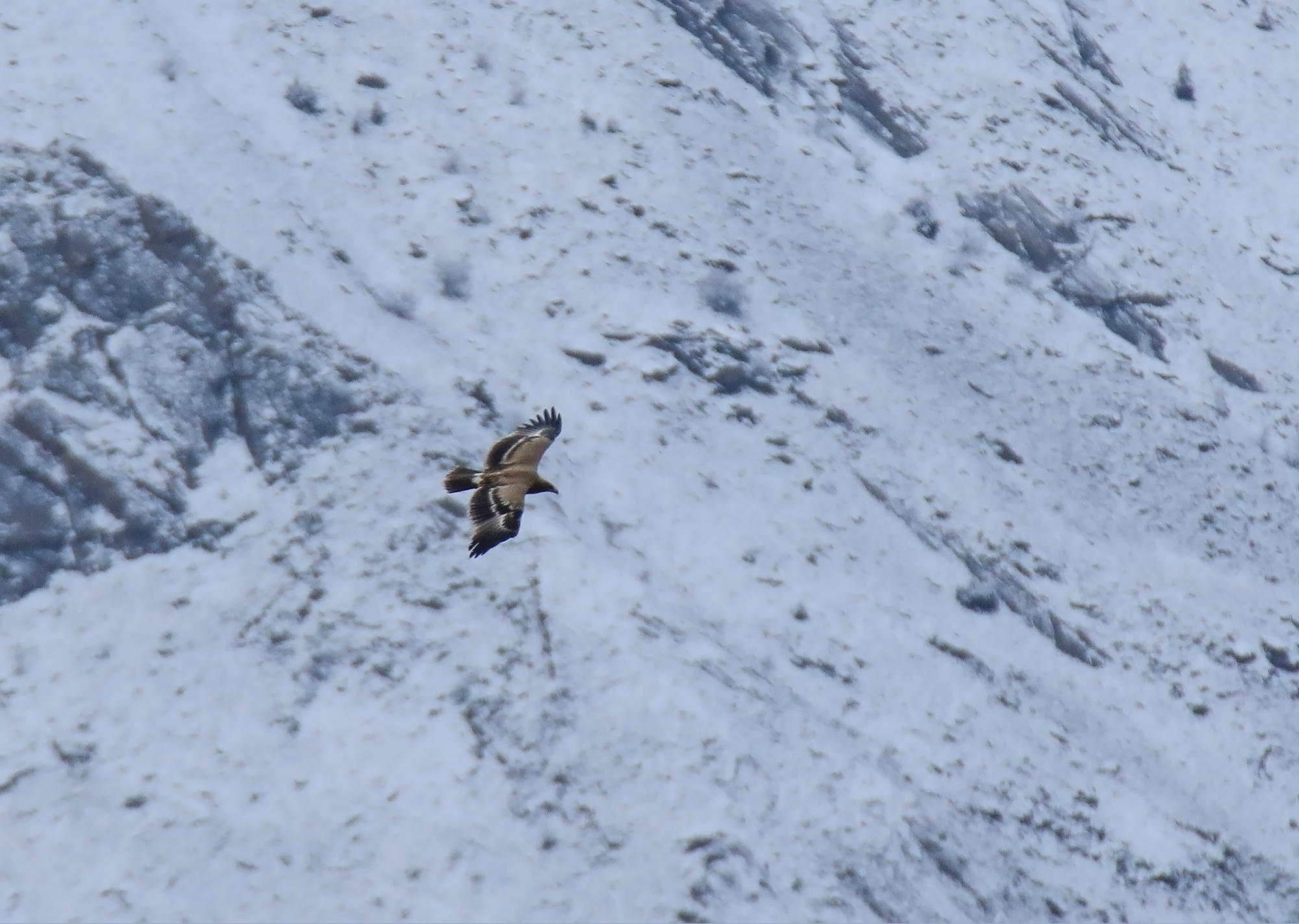
A steppe eagle flying over the snowy mountains near the Hunza Valley in Pakistan.

Although the breeding range is rather extensive, the steppe eagle is essentially confined to nesting in only four large nations: Russia, Kazakhstan, Mongolia and China. However, the steppe eagle once bred in Europe. Here, they bred into the 20th century in at least southeasternmost Ukraine and perhaps elsewhere in eastern Europe. These eagles still rarely occur as breeders in southwest Russia from Stavropol to Astrakhan. The steppe eagle is still mapped to breed down to Makhachkala and Maykop to as far west as Leningradskaya, up north as far as the lower Volga and down to the Caspian Sea nearly as far as Makhachkala and south of Fort-Shevchenko. The breeding range extends through appropriate habitat in much of Kazakhstan, from north of Astana south to (albeit spottily) to Kyzylorda as well as around the former Aral Sea. From their main breeding areas to the north, steppe eagles breed also marginally in northeastern Kyrgyzstan and perhaps northern Uzbekistan. The breeding distribution is essentially continuous as sweep far to the east in Russia as Transbaikal and Altai. The steppe eagle also breeds in large stretches of western and northern China such as Tian Shan, Xinjiang, the Gobi area, Gansu, Ningxia, northern Tibet (by far their southernmost breeding area), Inner Mongolia and reach their eastern breeding limits in Manchuria and elsewhere in northeastern China. The species breeding range is also quite broad into Mongolia excluding the northern portion.

=== Wintering range ===
The steppe eagle is entirely migratory, wintering in east and, to a lesser extent, southern Africa. Their African range can extend western to southern Sudan, almost throughout east Africa, to the easternmost part of Democratic Republic of the Congo. The southern African wintering range extends to central Angola, northern and eastern Namibia south to Botswana, Zambia, Zimbabwe, Eswatini and northern South Africa, including former Transvaal and northern Natal as well as rarely south of the Orange River In South Africa, steppe eagles are reportedly often frequent only in the lowveld of Kruger National Park area. The steppe eagle's wintering range also extends into the Middle East. They occur broadly in the season in several central and southern parts of the Arabian Peninsula as well as regularly in eastern Iraq and western Iran with odd ones north to Turkey and Georgia. Although sometimes recorded as occurring "somewhat" in Arabia, more extensive surveying has revealed that many, if not more, steppe eagles wind up winter in the peninsula rather than Africa, and that the largest ever winter numbers were recorded in Saudi Arabia, where around 7200 individuals (or perhaps up to 9% of the current world population) were recorded near Riyadh. As many as 3000 have also been similarly recorded in the nation of Oman. Other nations to host wintering steppe eagles include Yemen, Azerbaijan and Syria as well as, albeit rarely doing so, in the United Arab Emirates, Lebanon and Kuwait.

Unusually, a few overwintering steppe eagles have been now recorded in Kazakhstan, apparently near Shymkent, in the Aksu-Zhabagly Nature Reserve, the valley of the Syr Darya, the Shardara Dam and towns of the East Kazakhstan Region. In south Asia, the species in winter may occur from Afghanistan (rarely wintering still in the Nuristan Province) and in much of the Indian subcontinent. Pakistan's Poonch and Jhelum valleys of Azad Kashmir are known to host a mean of 154 steppe eagles per study area. In India, they may occur mainly south to Madhya Pradesh, the Indo-Gangetic Plain, the Deccan Peninsula and Himalayan zone, Mizoram, Assam and southern Orissa. Vagrants have been recorded in India to Periyar National Park, Mahendragiri, Kanyakumari Wildlife Sanctuary and Mudumalai National Park. The wintering range extends east to Tibet (although the species is said to be gone from Lhasa in recent years), Nepal, Burma and broadly in east China from southeastern Guizhou to Hainan and southwestern Guangdong. Recent wintering records reflect the species as lingering seasonally at different points of the non-breeding season, albeit very seldom, in central and southern Myanmar, western Thailand, peninsular Malaysia and northern Vietnam. The species may have been aided in expanding their eastward wintering range by deforestation practice.

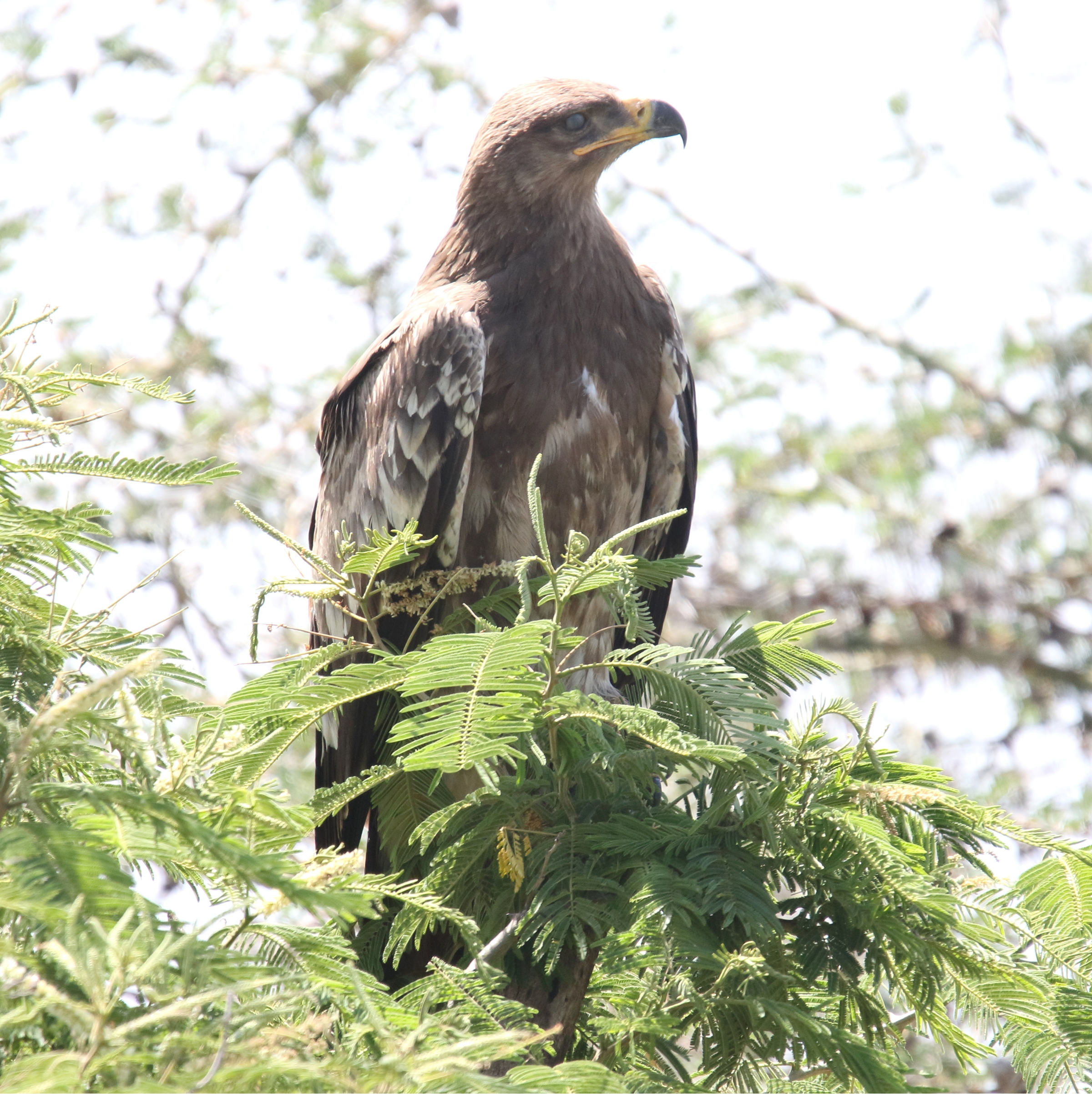
A young steppe eagle seen in Tanzania.

==== Migratory range ====
The steppe eagle appears broadly in many nations between their central Eurasian breeding areas and their generally tropical Indo and African wintering grounds. As a matter of fact, the largest concentrations of the species tend to occur at times of passage. The steppe eagle can also vagrate not infrequently far away from traditional migration sites, and has turned up in many areas from western Europe to as far east as Japan. Vagrant steppe eagles have been recorded in at least the following nations or regions: at least 6 nations in west Africa Morocco, Tunisia, the Netherlands, Finland (at least 50 times) as well as Spain and France, the Czech Republic, Bulgaria and Romania (in both of which they once bred but were extirpated), Greece Mordovia, Yakutia, the Korean Peninsula and probably down to Borneo in Asia. Migration sites include both mountainous ridges and the larger seas along their routes. Steppe eagles predominantly use two main migration routes: one radiates across the Middle East and Arabia, with many birds stopping to winter, but many too migrate around the Red Sea to winter in Africa while the other main migration path frequently involves farther eastern breeding eagles moving along many ridges and prominent flyways before radiated across a broad path through the Himalayas, in order to reach the south Asian and other Asian wintering sites. Less known or less frequently migration paths before these well-known routes of passage may lead steppe eagles around the Black Sea in the west and, much more frequently, around the Caspian Sea farther east. Nations known to be visited by steppe eagles almost exclusively in migratory passage include Egypt, most but not all of Syria, Turkmenistan and Afghanistan and much of east China from Tuquan County to about Xiamen. Points of migration bottleneck, where large numbers of steppe eagles are frequently recorded, are known in areas including Palestine, especially around Eilat, Suez (in Egypt), Bab-el-Mandeb (in Yemen), some parts of the nation of Georgia and, in the Himalayan region, especially within Nepal but also sometimes en masse in Pakistan and northern India. Migration sites of minor significance are less known but include Alborz.

== Habitat ==
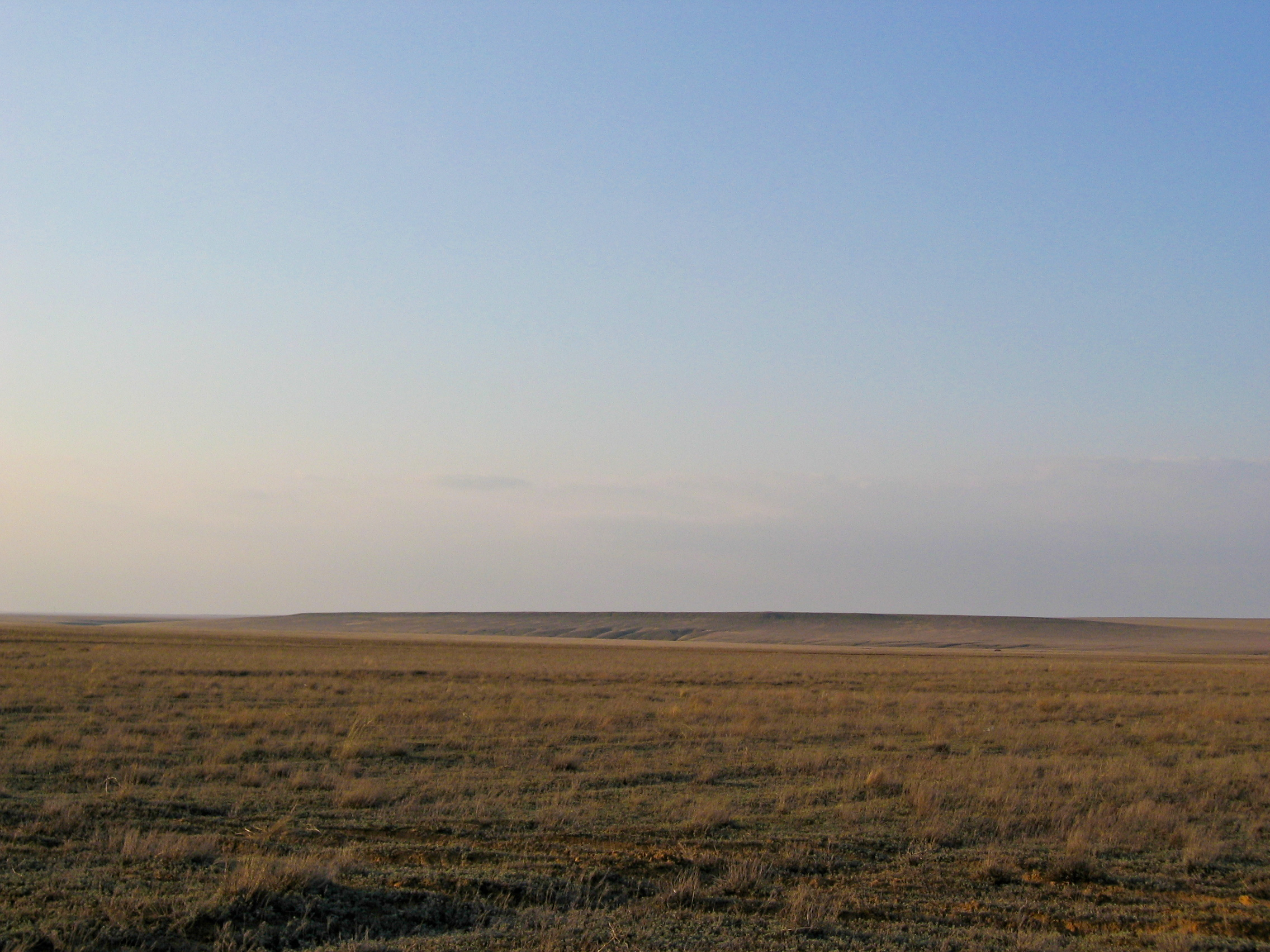
The vast and quite flat steppe is the unique home of breeding steppe eagles.

=== Breeding habitat ===
The steppe eagle tends to breed in open dry country, within the characteristic habitat it is named after: the steppe both in both upland and lowland areas. In Kazakhstan, it is known to generally occur in drier parts of the steppe than some other raptors like harriers. This species generally avoids utilizing agricultural land such as arables and most other human-fragmented areas, however, they can be somewhat tolerant of nesting near roads. Associated habitats are frequented when breeding such as flat plains, arid grassland, semi-desert and even desert edge. Most members of the species breed at lower levels but largely in eastern part of the range also will nest in poorly vegetated dry rocky hillsides such as granite massifs and upland valleys, though generally avoid truly mountainous areas.

=== Wintering habitat ===
Wintering steppe eagles often occur much more frequently in human-modified areas in order to access easy foods. These include landfills and livestock carcass dumps, these being used frequently everywhere from Arabia to India. More natural habitats used most often by wintering steppe eagles tend to be various wetlands or other waterways where they are available. In winter, mostly savanna and grasslands are the predominant habitat used in Africa, also sometimes dry woodland. Study in Botswana indicated that wintering steppe eagles there appeared to be indifferent to land use changes by humans. In Zambia and Malawi, it was found that the steppe eagle was only frequent in high-elevation plateau areas from 370 to 2,400 m (1,210 to 7,870 ft) metres above sea level. Use of plateaus was also frequent in Zimbabwe, often where open savanna woods of Acacia stand as well as the use of cultivated areas such as wheat stubble fields by eagles. Iraqi wintering steppe eagles often used dump sites as well as deserts and semi-arid areas, with more steppe, other grassland and mountain slopes used in northern Iraq in winter. In Armenia steppe eagles are apparently frequent in old fields and orchards. In south Asia they usually use open country and often frequents large lakes and other wetlands near arid areas but may accept, or even prefer, more heavily wooded areas (however the first records from peninsular Malaysia seem to be from open areas created by deforestation). Although usually a breeder of lowlands, it has been known to live at elevations of up to 2,300 m (7,500 ft) and locally to 3,000 m (9,800 ft) in mountains, on passage can occur to over 4,500 m (14,800 ft) sometimes even to 7,925 m (26,001 ft), as was recorded on Mount Everest. Compared to other Palearctic migrating eagles, the steppe eagle seems to perhaps be slightly more tolerant of a wider range of climatic conditions, including rather humid conditions in India provided subsistence is available as well as up to 50 cm (20 in) of snow cover in Kazakhstan (living off of urban pests).

== Behaviour ==
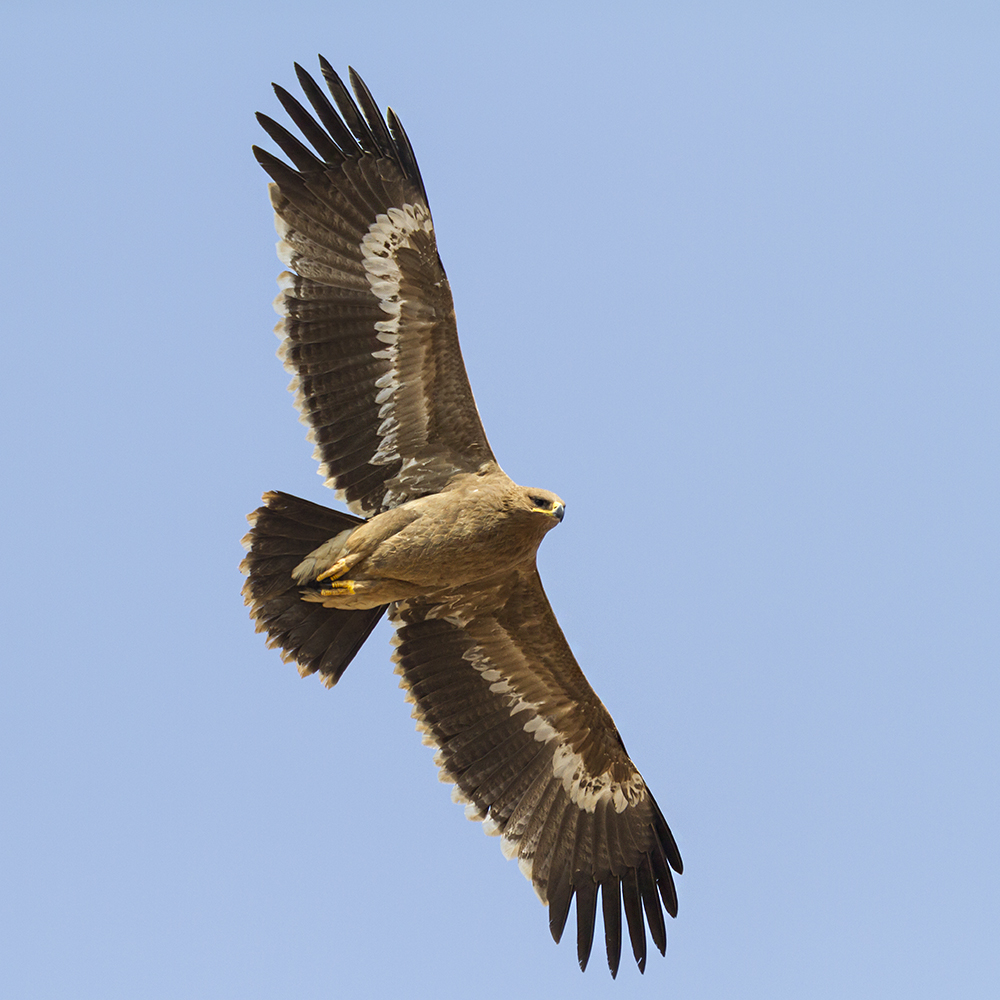
A steppe eagle juvenile seen in Kerala.

The steppe eagle is sometimes regarded as solitary but is frequently seen in the company of conspecifics throughout the year. Besides the obvious breeding pair, they often flock during migration and aggregate in occasionally ample numbers during non-breeding times, usually at fruitful feeding sites, sometimes briefly cooperating with one another especially to klepoparasitize other birds of prey. Steppe eagles fly with slow, deep and stiff-looking wing beats, holding wings fully extend on upstrokes, rendering a heavier flight pattern than spotted eagles. The flight of the steppe eagle is well-analyzed such as experiments with a captive male and observations of migrants in Israel. It appears that the underwing coverts operate as a high-lift device and probably provide stability through unsteady maneuvers, otherwise positive loading on the wings can be maintained. Whilst soaring, generally the wings are held flattish or slightly flexed but sometimes with the hands lowered. About 90% of flight by these eagles in Israel was gliding or soaring. They often fly with the head dropped with hands arched in a glide or often arms straight out and hands drooped. The drooping wing flight method, peculiar to the steppe eagle as well as to the greater spotted eagle, is sometimes also called the "tuck", and is thought to be a gust response precipitated by a transient drop in aerodynamic loading. Steppes adapt their flight to wind and thermal conditions as was studied in Israel, increasing their gliding airspeed under strong thermal convections or opposing winds. This study determined that a combination of circling in thermals and inter-thermal gliding was interspersed with soaring in straight-line glide. Israeli migrants flew up to 1,600 m (5,200 ft) above the ground but 90% were under 1,000 m (3,300 ft) and half were below 400 m (1,300 ft). The Israeli steppe eagles were able to maintain a mean climbing rate of 1.9 m (6.2 ft) per second, a mean cross-country air speed of 12.4 m (41 ft) per second and a mean of 15.6 m (51 ft) per second in glides; the flight was similar as in other common raptors here but the steppe eagle attained the highest mean cross-country speeds. Steppe eagles tend not to be very vocal especially when not breeding. Their main call is a raspy bark which is similar to that a tawny eagle, despite being mildly deeper. In aerial displays, a loud whistle has been recorded, quite unlike any vocalization of a tawny eagle. Other call recorded have included mainly low and croaking notes aside from a high shriek when startled.

=== Migration ===
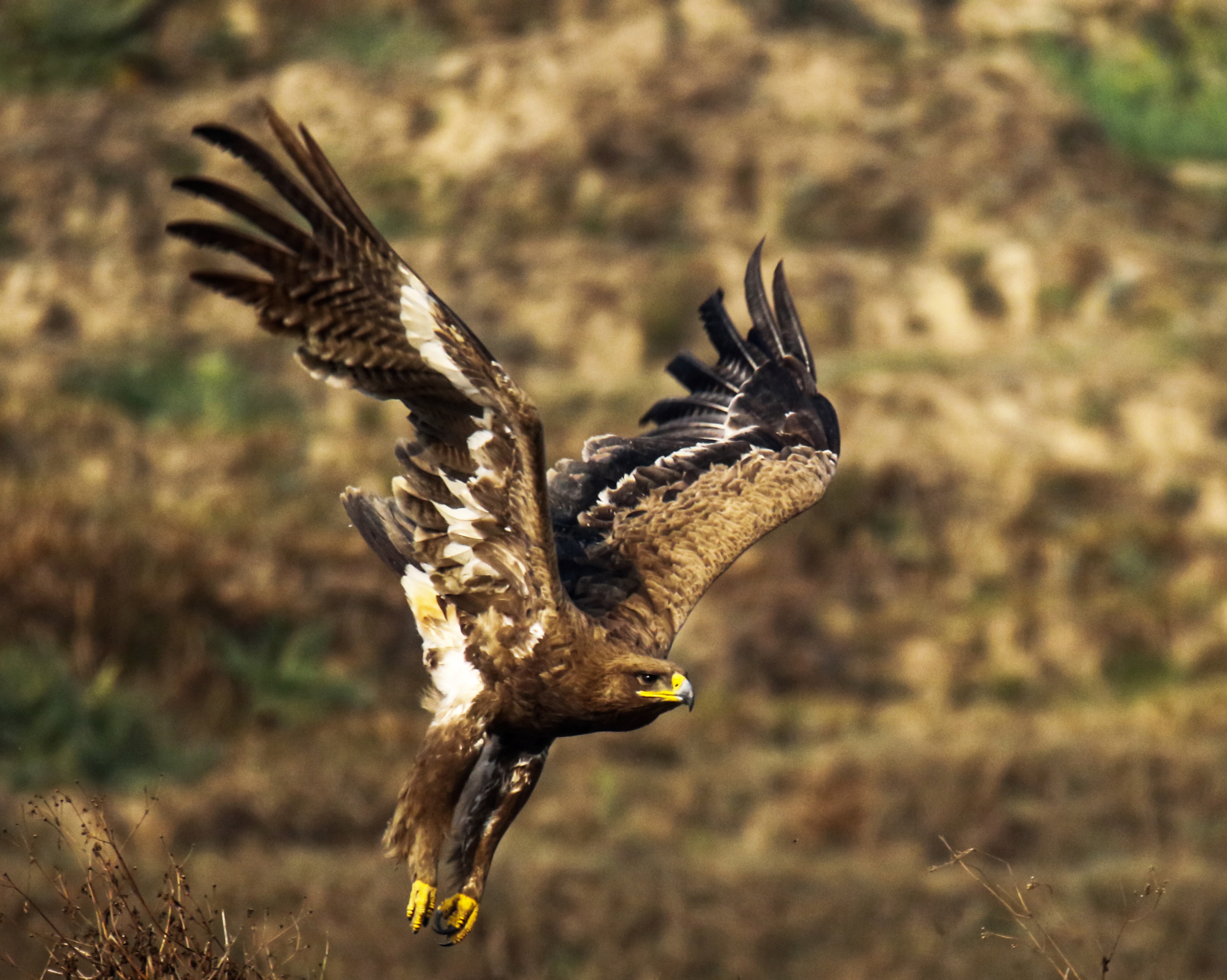
A steppe eagle photographed in Nepal, arguably their primary point of passage in the eastern part of the range.

Steppe eagles appeared to have evolved the strategy of migrating from their breeding grounds, due in large part to the temporary seasonal availability of their main prey, ground squirrels. They probably migrate in greater numbers than any other eagle in the world and can appear to be frequent enough at migration sites that they may mask less numerous migrating eagles that are mistakenly missed in their ranks. The migratory behaviour of this species is arguably amongst the best-studied aspect of its entire biology. Autumn migration often begins around October on fairly broad fronts, and may peak around late October. It usually ends in late November to December but steppe eagles frequently travel somewhat nomadically while not breeding and so individuals may not reach their winter terminus point until about January. Spring migration usually commences in February, peaking early from late February to March, with likely all gone from Africa by the end of the latter month, then continuing in a diminishing trickle into April and May. In passage at Suez, the steppe eagle is one of the earlier migrating raptors on average alongside the long-legged buzzard (Buteo rufinus), averaging about a month sooner in passage than the common buzzard (Buteo buteo) (the most common migrant there) and slightly sooner than the lesser spotted eagle, as well as much sooner than some other raptors there. On average, the wintering period in Africa is relatively brief, at a mean of about up to about 4 months (down to about 2), while adult steppe eagles spend up to 7 months (max of around 5 months for a young eagle) on their breeding grounds. In autumn records from Africa, younger eagles migrate the earliest and adults the latest. Radio-tagging studies confirmed, much as in the lesser spotted eagle, that in spring juveniles migrated later, wandering about more so and came back to the summering grounds much later. One young steppe eagle that was banded in passage in the United Arab Emirates wintered initially in Yemen before returning for the summer to Kazakhstan, then migrating to eastern Africa the following winter, showing that they can change their migratory habits over time. Many studies corroborate that steppe eagles generally migrate lesser distances as they age.

Peak movements around the Red Sea show as many as 76,000 steppe eagles moving over Bab-el-Mandeb in the fall of 1987, with up to 65,000 (in 1981) in Suez and up to 75,000 in Eilat, Israel in the year 1985. Once migrating steppe eagles enter Africa in autumn, no mass migrations have been recorded anywhere for the species in the continent. Although not large, some semi-significant spring movements were detected in Egypt, despite none being recorded in the fall. In autumn, steppe eagles usually pass over Bab-el-Mandeb in the north of Red Sea while in spring they predominantly cross to the south of the Red Sea around Suez. The mean number of steppe eagles that annually pass over Eilat in spring are estimated at 28,032 with a mean peak day of 10 March, making them roughly the fourth most common migrating raptor in spring there (and they often pass in intermingled flocks with other soaring raptors, but not those with powered flight). In Eilat, steppe eagles constitute 6.4% of all raptors seen, nearly all of the Aquila eagles seen and, among those that could be aged, an estimated 60–70% of the steppes seen were thought to be adults. More unusually, the steppe eagle may be the only raptor to also use Israel as a common migratory flight path in autumn as well as spring, with even commoner migrating raptors such as common buzzards and European honey buzzards (Pernis apivorus) being rare there in the fall. In Nepal over 2.5 weeks starting on 20 October, nearly 7852 steppe eagles were tallied, making up more than 80% of the recorded migrating raptors, with peak times of movement being between 10:00 AM and 4:00 PM, especially between noon and 2:00 PM. Over 3 years of study in Nepal, 21,447 steppe eagles were recorded (as many as 1102 within a day and a mean of about 15.2 an hour) at the counting sites. Strong evidence of east-to-west migratory movements, rather than south or northbound, has been made in the Kathmandu Valley. It was indicated based on the directional studies that especially juveniles from the eastern part of the breeding may be more frequently migrate westbound to reach wintering areas such as the Middle East and Africa. On the contrary, juveniles and subadults during the wintering season seem to considerably outnumber adults in the Indian subcontinent so many do head due south. Of 3381 ageable steppe eagles in passage in Nepal, 56% were juveniles or immature, 44% were adults; of 7852 eagles, 58% migrated in groups of 1–5, 30% in 5–20 groups and 12% in larger flocks. In Himachal Pradesh of India, about 11,000 steppe eagles were recorded in autumn migration in 2001 and about 40% less were counted the next spring. This study indicated different migratory paths being used in the seasons, presumably following the winds predominant direction around the terrain, with the westerly autumn migration mostly in the western Himalayas and the easterly spring migration more so in the east of Nepal. Staging areas are not well-delineated in India but appear to concentrate around feeding sites such as landfills. A single female that was radio-tagged in Mongolia was recorded to travel southwest and stop in southeastern Tibet, which is also the southernmost part of the species breeding range. The data from this female indicated that not all steppe eagles move to warmer climates and, based on that she remained stationary until her return to Mongolia, that she was not nomadic as many eagles of the species are. During return spring migration, the steppe eagles in passage in Nepal will reportedly amass into groups of approximately 5 to 20 eagles at only about 20 to 70 m (66 to 230 ft) above the terrain before rising up to cross between the snow-covered peaks.

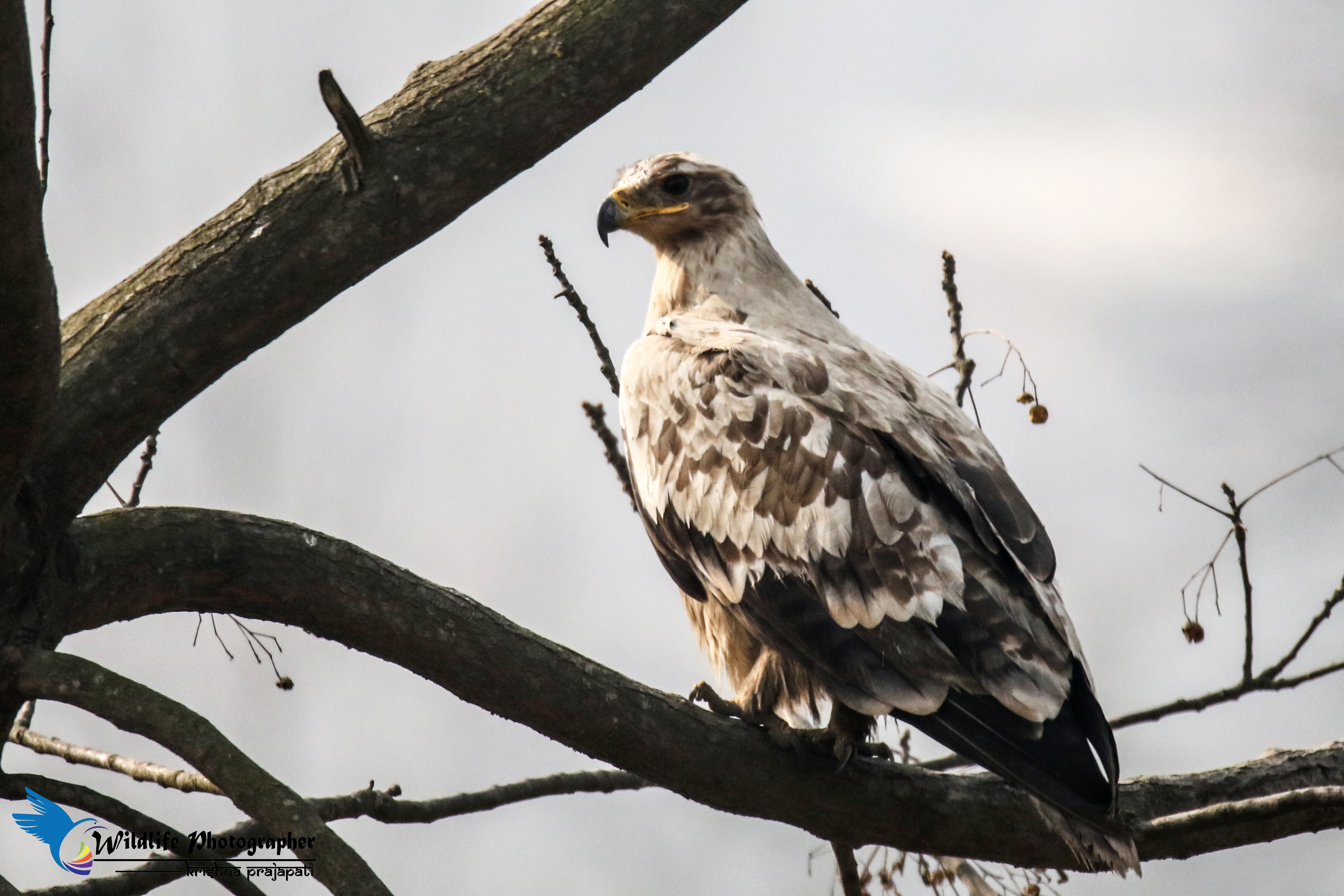
An unusual, pale probable subadult steppe eagle in Nepal.

16 radio-tagged eagles that returned in their first spring migration to their Kazakh summering grounds were recorded to winter as first-year juveniles either, in roughly equal measure, in the Arabian Peninsula or southern Africa, and covered straight-line distances, ranging from 3,489 to 9,738 km (2,168 to 6,051 mi), although individually could meander up to 20,644 km (12,828 mi) for one eagle migrating from wintering grounds Botswana. Of the 16 returning Kazakhstan eagles, spring migration lasted an average of 40 days, ranging individually from 38 to 54 days and covered a mean of 355 km (221 mi) each day. The migration path generally led the eagles around almost every direction of the Red Sea, many also passing over Israel and some wrapping around the Caspian Sea. A different radio-tagging study of 19 juveniles (about 57% of which survived) from Russian or Kazakh sites found that autumn movements in the 1st year migration averaged 4,222 km (2,623 mi) and confirmed not only that they freely changed wintering sites anywhere from India to southern Africa but they never returned, surviving or not, to their natal site in the 1st year, instead return to wandering widely across the northern steppe. The 1st migration averaged 52 days and were much briefer for females than for males, with the discrepancies more pronounced for eagles originating from the Altai Mountains. 15 birds tracked in this study were found to have migrated most frequently to winter in south Pakistan (right along the borderlands to India) or in eastern Turkmenistan. Spring migration began on a mean date of 25 March for the 15 young eagles and lasted about 26 days on average, covering a mean of 3,925 km (2,439 mi), with females initiating migration on average 18 days later than males and migrating more briefly, more quickly and more often with fewer stops than males. 9 eagles which were tracked successfully in their first spring passage in this study wandering widely mostly in natural steppe hunting for squirrels and 8 of these tracked to their 2nd autumn migration took about 1.5 times shorter on their 2nd autumn passage and migrated about 17% less far on average.

== Dietary biology ==
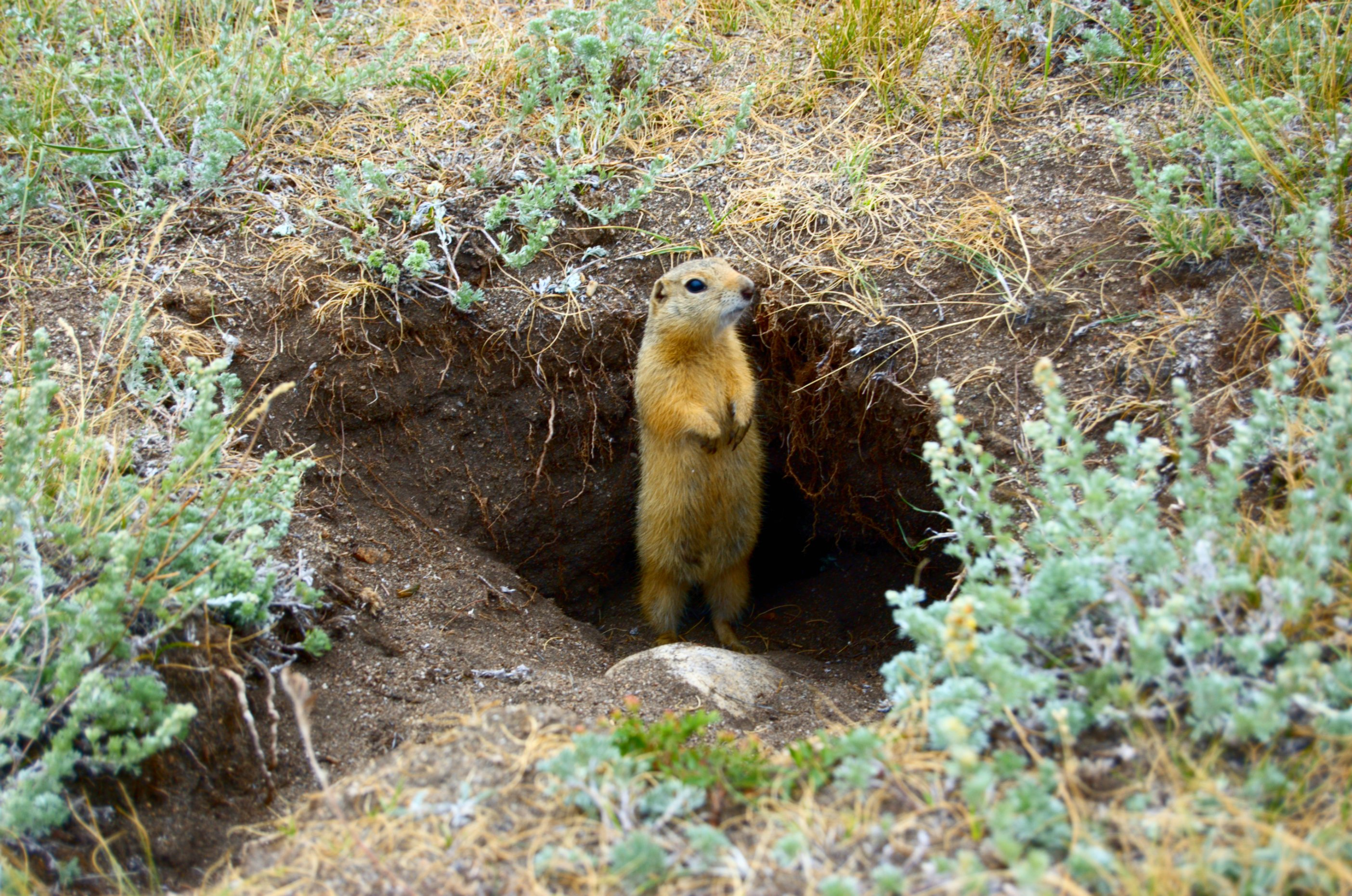
Ground squirrels like long-tailed ground squirrels are often the most important prey for breeding steppe eagles.

The steppe eagle is an opportunistic predator like other Aquila eagles but has a number of dietary and foraging peculiarities. They prey mainly on small-sized mammals, with some birds (such as queleas) and reptiles and (mostly in winter) frequently insects (such as termites and locusts) and carrion. Despite their opportunistic nature, the steppe eagle is a somewhat specialized predator on particular mammals such as ground squirrels while breeding and, during non-breeding times, feeds on various foods but is often peculiarly narrow in dietary selection, preferring massed food sources that require little effort for them to obtain. Various other small or medium-sized mammals can become the most significant prey locally on the breeding grounds, such as voles, pikas and zokors and, generally more secondarily, marmots, hares, gerbils, hedgehogs and others. During the breeding season, one resource claimed that prey mostly weighs 50 to 250 g (1.8 to 8.8 oz). Another account estimated that about 95% of prey weighed less than 250 g (8.8 oz), although predominantly over 63 g (2.2 oz). However, yet another resource claimed that staple prey for steppe eagles could weigh anywhere from 50 g (1.8 oz) up to 1,500 g (3.3 lb). Even the latter estimate may be conservative in size range, with prey species varying widely in size from very small insects from colonies to unexpectedly large mammals (and seldom birds) apparently killed near nests. On the other hand, a preference has indeed been detected for smaller burrowing mammals (i.e. probably under 250 g (8.8 oz) or so). Studies have determined where only larger species of burrowing mammals are predominant (even the larger species of ground squirrel), the steppe eagles appear to attain comparatively sparse nest densities, only occurring in high densities where the smaller burrowers are profuse. Ecological partitioning to limit interspecific competition may be a factor that dictates the steppe eagle's preference for relatively small prey. The breeding steppe eagle mainly hunts in a low soaring or gliding flight, at a maximum of 200 m (660 ft), diving or making short, accelerated stoops onto their prey. Usually, they tend to capture their prey on the ground. Steppe eagles have been recorded in both Kazakhstan and Mongolia to tactfully avoid casting a shadow before descending onto prey and may drop stones to provide a distraction, a probable form of tool use. In the Kazakh observation, the steppe eagles quickly became used to agricultural activity adjacent to prey accesses while they hunted. They also may hunt in any season on the ground, moving with a shambling gait as necessary, and may give chase on foot to both vertebrate and insect prey. Steppe eagles can often ambush prey by standing in wait next to burrows, suddenly pouncing quickly onto the quarry upon its emergence. Steppe eagles have been seen in China to buzz through locust swarms on the wing as well as to taking avian prey from over 200 m (660 ft) above the ground in a dive. Tandem hunting by pairs has been recorded during the breeding season while, in winter and migration, these may be the most social of all eagles, often sharing by up to the dozens abundant food sources. The non-breeding steppe eagle flocks may even seem to assist one another in procuring prey from which they themselves are not likely to be able to directly profit and may repeatedly assist each other until all flock members are satiated. If confirmed, this mutually beneficial foraging strategy between presumably unrelated eagles is truly unique. Much like the tawny eagle, the steppe eagle will readily rob other raptors of their catches, approaching from any angle and pursuing closely until the victim is forced to land or drop its food.

=== Summer diet ===
The single prey species most strongly associated with the steppe eagle is the little ground squirrel (Spermophilus pygmaeus). In some areas, as much as 98% of the diet reportedly can be little ground squirrels. This is a smallish ground squirrel though it is actually not greatly smaller than many other Eurasian ground squirrels, at a mean adult weight of about 235.2 g (8.30 oz). The little ground squirrel once reached densities of around 30–40 per hectare and provided a reliable food source for these eagles. However, this species has plummeted in population density, in Kalmykia for instance going down from abundant in diverse habitats to perhaps locally extinct before gradually trickling back up in numbers (which continue to be a mere shadow of what they once were). The local steppe eagles of Kalmykia continue to show a strong preference for little ground squirrels. A continued primary reliance on little ground squirrels by steppe eagles was also found recent in studies from Saratov and Lake Baskunchak as well. Out of Russian, in the Karaganda Region of Kazakhstan, little ground squirrels again were an important identified food source, at 19.25% of 400 prey items. In the general area between the Aral Sea and the Caspian Sea, 112 prey items were led by little ground squirrels, at just over 33%. However, in this data, the little ground squirrels were closely followed in number (29.7%) by the yellow ground squirrel (Spermophilus fulvus), which, with seasonal weights ranging from 500 to 2,000 g (1.1 to 4.4 lb), is the largest of Eurasian ground squirrels. The little ground squirrel is only found in a substantial portion of the western part of the range, so elsewhere steppe eagles tend to prey on different prey species while breeding, though generally continue to take small burrowing mammals, of course.

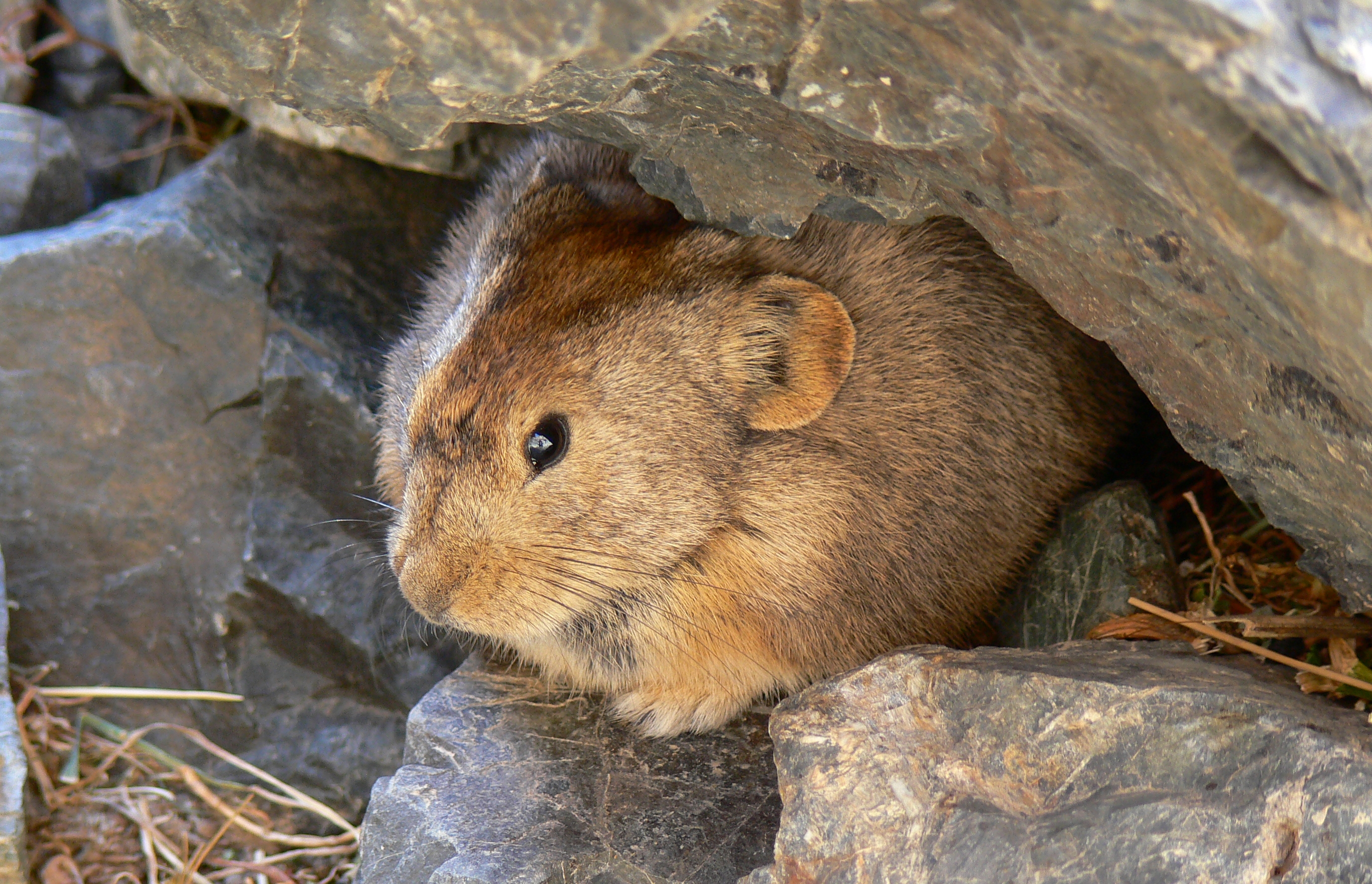
Small mammals like Daurian pika are often taken in significant numbers by steppe eagles.

Around Lake Balkhash in Kazakhstan, the main prey was reportedly the red-cheeked ground squirrel (Spermophilus erythrogenys), a slightly larger ground squirrel than the little species at a mean adult weight of 355 g (12.5 oz). Other prey noted here included Pallas's pika (Ochotona pallasi), Libyan jird (Meriones libycus) and tolai hare (Lepus tolai). In Xinjiang, reportedly the main prey species is the 415 g (14.6 oz) long-tailed ground squirrel (Urocitellus undulatus). In the Altai region, the leading prey may be the Siberian zokor (Myospalax myospalax), which is the size of a large ground squirrel at an adult weight of about 453 g (0.999 lb). However, some report in the Altai region that the main prey is the long-tailed ground squirrel and the migration arrival times do seem to correspond closely with this species hibernation emergence period. Yet another primary prey resource reported for steppe eagles in the Altai is the much larger gray marmot (Marmota baibacina). All the primary prey in the previously little reported Altai population are as adults well over what is considered the typical prey size range for this eagle, such as long-tailed ground squirrels, zokors and marmots as well as ptarmigan, and in turn, this may favor the large size of the steppe eagles from this region. On the contrary, other predominant prey in steppe eagle nests can be even smaller than ground squirrels. In Mongolia, the main prey by a large margin was reportedly the Brandt's vole (Lasiopodomys brandtii), which weigh about 40 g (1.4 oz). In the Transbaikal region, the main prey may be the Daurian pika (Ochotona dauurica), which weighs about 155 g (5.5 oz). This pika can account for around 39%, as was the case in 62 prey items, (and perhaps up to 62% locally) of the diet in the region. Another study reported a very different primary food source for the Transbaikal, which was the young of the much larger Tarbagan marmot (Marmota sibirica), which were estimated in the study to be from 55 to 77% of the annual diet. Even more conflicting data found that some Transbaikal steppe eagles derived as much as 70% of their foods from long-tailed and Daurian ground squirrels (Spermophilus dauricus). It is possible that in both Altai and Transbaikal that the shifts to differing reported primary prey species are responses of the eagles to shifting prey availabilities as many burrowing mammals are subject to population cycles as well as human-sourced depletions. While rodents and some lagomorphs are usually favored in the diet, in some areas steppe eagles can live at least in part off of quite different prey such as long-eared hedgehogs (Hemiechinus auritus). Other notable prey taken regularly whilst breeding by steppe eagles includes steppe pika (Ochotona pusilla) (especially in the Volga region), alpine pika (Ochotona alpina), yellow steppe lemming (Eolagurus luteus) (especially in eastern Kazakhstan), or the slightly larger types of gerbil such as great gerbils (Rhombomys opimus) and Mongolian gerbils (Meriones unguiculatus). The study of the Karaganda region of Kazakhstan with 400 prey items found illustrated that the steppe eagle is capable of deriving a living from a wide range of prey, with the foods led by rosy starling (Pastor roseus) (mostly fledglings), at 24%, unidentified Microtus voles, at 19.75%, followed by little ground squirrels, unspecified pikas (8.25%), European hares (Lepus europaeus) (5%) and grey partridges (Perdix perdix) (4.5%). An aptitude for avian prey was detected in Transbaikal particularly, including Daurian partridge (Perdix dauurica) and Japanese quail (Coturnix japonica) (the latter at up to 15.6% of the diet). In Altai, assorted corvids (at up to 24.2% of the diet), probably mostly rooks (Corvus frugilegus) and Eurasian magpie (Pica pica), were important to diet as were willow ptarmigan (Lagopus lagopus). Within the Saratov area, medium-sized birds were frequently reported in the diet, such as grey partridges, little bustards (Tetrax tetrax), northern lapwings (Vanellus vanellus) and rooks. A diversity of small passerines has been found in the diet, especially fledgling-age larks of various species, most frequently perhaps in Kazakhstan and Mongolia. A few reptiles found in the diet around nest have included at least sand lizard (Lacerta agilis), Caspian whipsnake (Dolichophis caspius) and steppe viper (Vipera ursinii).

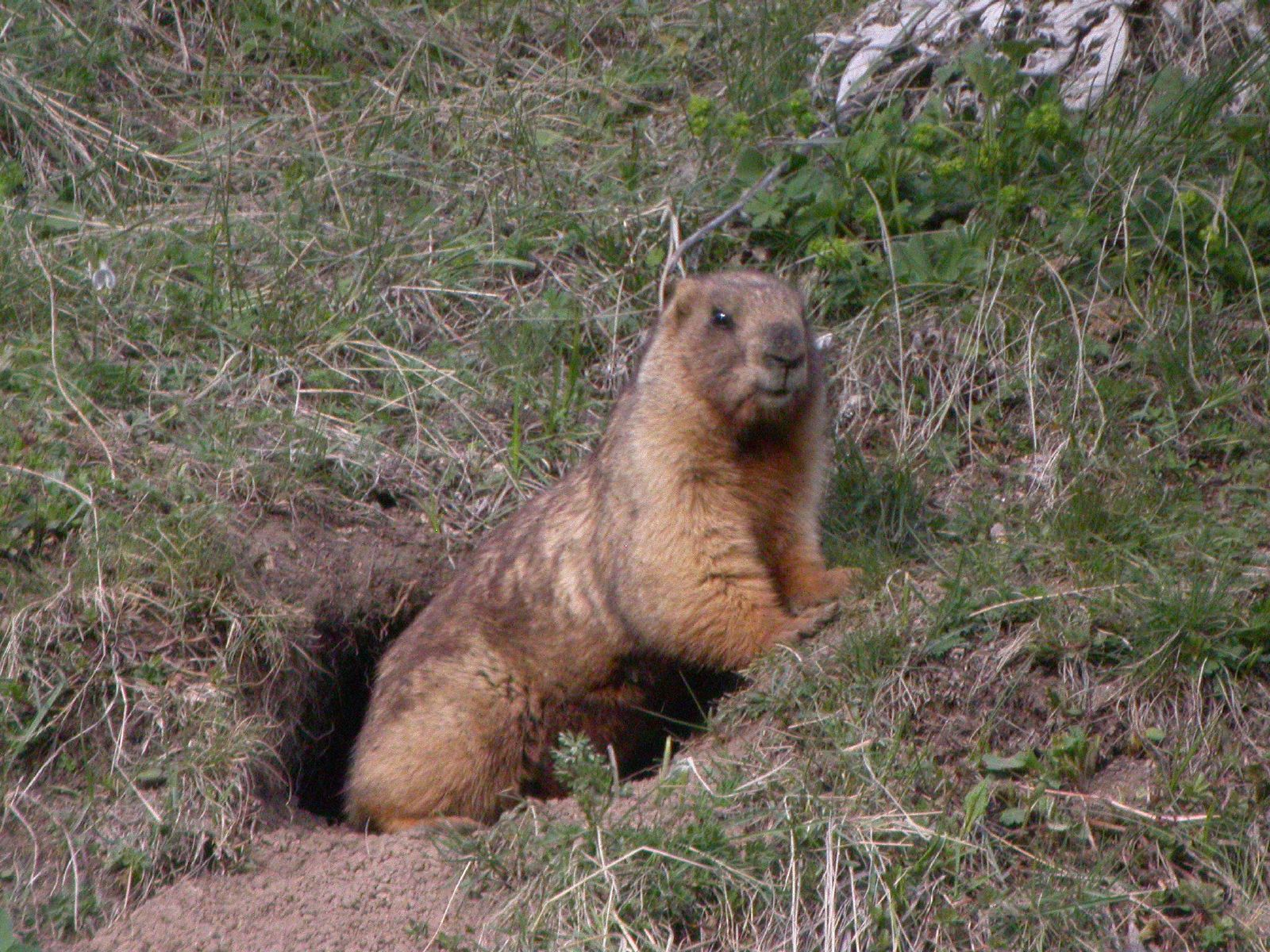
Larger prey such as gray marmots are infrequently targeted by steppe eagles.

On occasion, during summer, a steppe eagle may be able to take exceptionally large prey. The most regular large prey to appear in their diets are usually Tolai hare, at about 2 kg (4.4 lb), and assorted marmots. The upper size of marmots that the steppe eagle may attack is not well-established although this eagle is more tend to focus on small emergent juveniles around 1.5 kg (3.3 lb). Besides marmots and hares, steppe eagle takes a diversity of largish mammalian carnivores. Corsac fox (Vulpes corsac) and mustelids such as steppe polecats (Mustela eversmanii) are readily taken on some occasions, pallas cats (Otocolobus manul) and Rüppell's foxes (Vulpes rueppellii) can be taken as well. Additionally, the remains of the red fox (Vulpes vulpes) were found at the nest.

A broad range of young ungulates have also been found in small numbers and it is likely that some are taken both as carrion and as kills, including goitered gazelle (Gazella subgutturosa), Mongolian gazelle (Procapra gutturosa), saiga antelope (Saiga tatarica) and domestic goat (Capra aegagrus hircus). In newborns of these species, weights can vary from around 2 kg (4.4 lb) (in goats) to about 3.5 kg (7.7 lb) (in saiga antelope). The taking of large birds is less well-documented than predation on large mammals and in some cases both in summer and during non-breeding times certainly pertain to nestling predations, such as on storks and cranes, or to pilfering easy large fowl like chickens (Gallus gallus domesticus) or domestic turkeys (Meleagris gallopavo).

=== Non-breeding diet ===
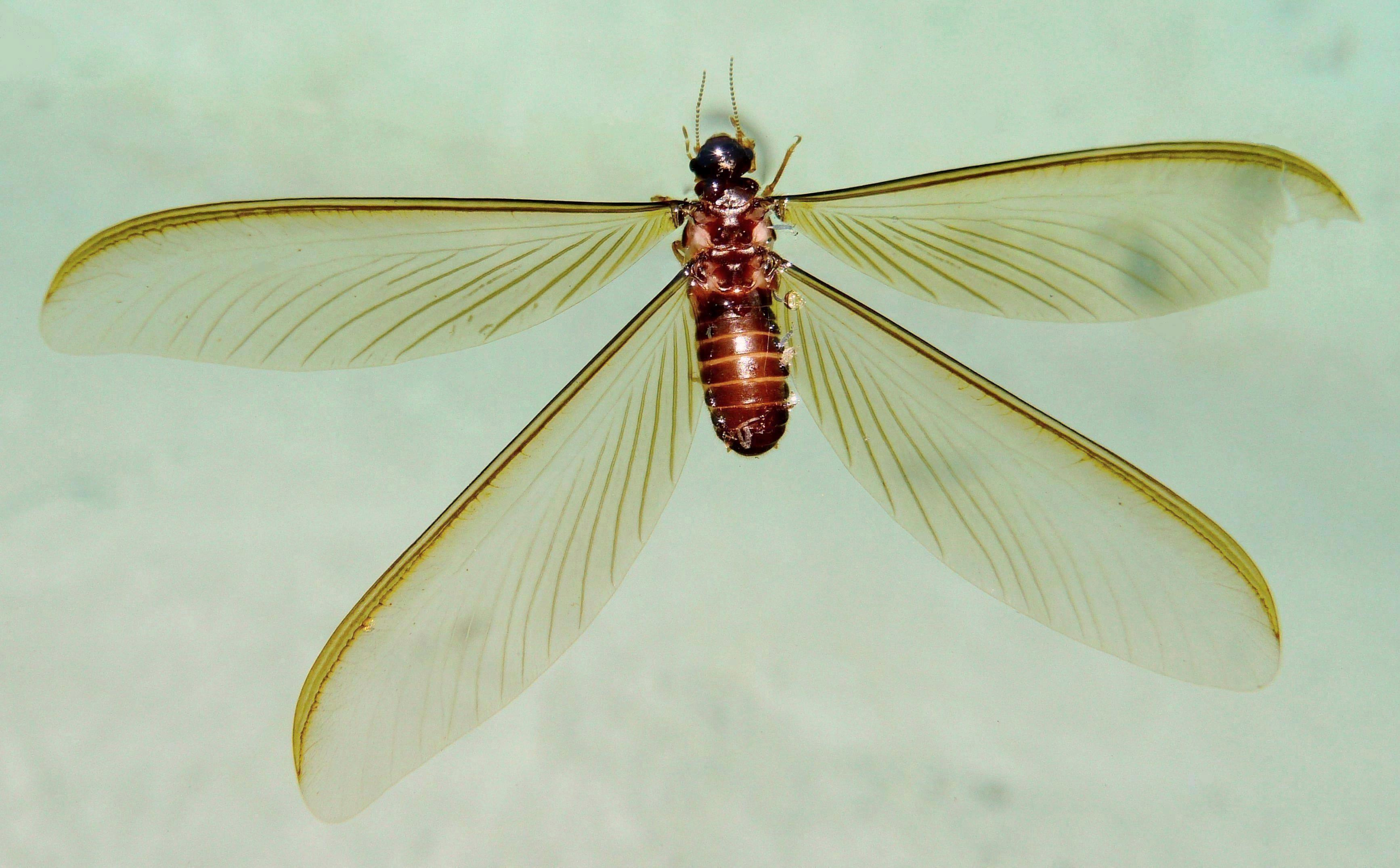
A harvester termite, the most significant wintering food for southern African steppe eagles.

The steppe eagle, despite being one of the most numerous and widely distributed of all eagles, is exceptionally poorly studied in its non-breeding dietary habits. This is due in large part to the nomadic behaviour displayed by most (but not all) steppe eagles during these times. Steppe eagles are fairly different from related species, being rather gregarious and non-predatory while away from their breeding grounds. Exceptionally, some steppe eagles have been known to overwinter in Altai Town, Kazakhstan, living reportedly off of brown rats (Rattus norvegicus) and rock doves (Columba livia). They are often seen congregating at feeding sites with easily obtained foods that are available in large quantities. In southern Africa, these eagles are often associated with rain fronts and the humidity that accompanies them. They do this largely to exploit a certain food source, termite alates. Termites are known to emerge more extensively in these conditions and so the steppe eagle, not unlike other long-distance migrant raptors, can become locally rather insectivorous to the exception of virtually any other foods. Most often, these eagles will fly down when it is noticed that termites are emerging or wait on foot and then grab them. According to one account these large eagles feed on termites "lumbering after their minuscule quarry in ludicrous fashion". They have also sometimes been seen to take termites in the air and feed on them in flight, not any easy task for such a large eagle. Roosts near termite colonies can contain several steppe eagles which may remain over days but generally depart whether well-fed or not if the rains disperse. In Namibia, the roosts used were the tops of quite small trees of only 2 to 3 m (6.6 to 9.8 ft) height. Although tiny with an average estimated weight of only 0.15 g (0.0053 oz), the harvester termite (Hodotermes mossambicus) (the main termite prey) have been deemed highly nutritious with a relatively high caloric value. It has been estimated that a steppe eagle would have to eat approximately 1600–2200 termites a day, which can be attainable in about 3 hours of feeding. The stomachs of 2 dissected steppe eagles contained 630 and 930 termite heads, respectively. In Zimbabwe, steppe eagles have also been seen in feeding masses in stubble fields picking out insects. However, it would reductive to consider the steppe eagle largely insectivorous in winter, since disproportionately the eagles seen feeding on termites in southern Africa were juveniles and immatures and many of the species winter outside of southern Africa; often wintering steppe eagles from other areas do not seem to live predominantly on insects. In east Africa, the diet of steppe eagles is poorly documented but is reported to consist largely of silvery mole-rats (Heliophobius argenteocinereus) and blesmols of the genus Cryptomys. Routine predation, probably on young or weak individuals, by steppe eagles has been recorded amongst flamingo colonies in east Africa. In several parts of Africa, steppe eagles may routinely visit and feed off of the colonies of the super-abundant bird, the red-billed quelea (Quelea quelea), with a noted focus on picking off the seemingly innumerous nestlings and fledglings of this small passerine. The steppe eagles will reportedly do so by ungracefully scrambling amongst the branches of the nesting colonies.

In the Indian subcontinent, the steppe eagle appears to fulfill the role of a weakly predatory opportunist. Individual Indian wintering steppe eagles are reported to feed at times of vulnerability of prey, including injured birds, eggs and young water birds from heronries, while groups of the eagles often occur around carrion, masses of stranded fish, poultry farms, garbage dumps and livestock carcass dumps. In Chari-Dhand wetlands, as many as 1000 steppe eagles have been seen to gather, presumably living largely off of vulnerable water birds. At the city dumps of Pune as many as 200 steppe eagles have been known to gather and feed. A carcass dump in Jorbeer near Bikaner was recorded to host an average of 43 steppe eagles per day during winter, with a peak number generally occurring in January and February (common dates from November to March and more rarely from September to May), with as many as 136 steppe eagles plus at least 9 other large raptors (mostly vultures), many of which are considered threatened species. It was found the Jorbeer carcass dumps enticed the steppe eagles to venture away from the normal wetland or wetland-adjacent areas used by steppe eagles in the area to the desert-like region, but feral dogs could, in some years, appear to chase off and cause the eagles to avoid this dump. A concentration of around 50 steppe eagle was seen to feed on swarms of locusts in Nepal. Perhaps to avoid competition (i.e. from vultures, jackals and so on) and to monopolize a food item, steppe eagles in India appear to come largely to smaller carcasses such as those of jungle cats (Felis chaus) and pythons. In the Banni Grasslands Reserve, steppe eagles are reported to largely hunt for food unlike in many other Indian reports, mainly on lesser bandicoot rats (Bandicota bengalensis), although also sometimes stole prey from other raptors. Similarly, active predation was unusually reported in Saurashtra and on larger prey including mongoose and Indian hare (Lepus nigricollis) as well as an unsuccessful attack on a mountain gazelle (Gazella gazella) fawn.

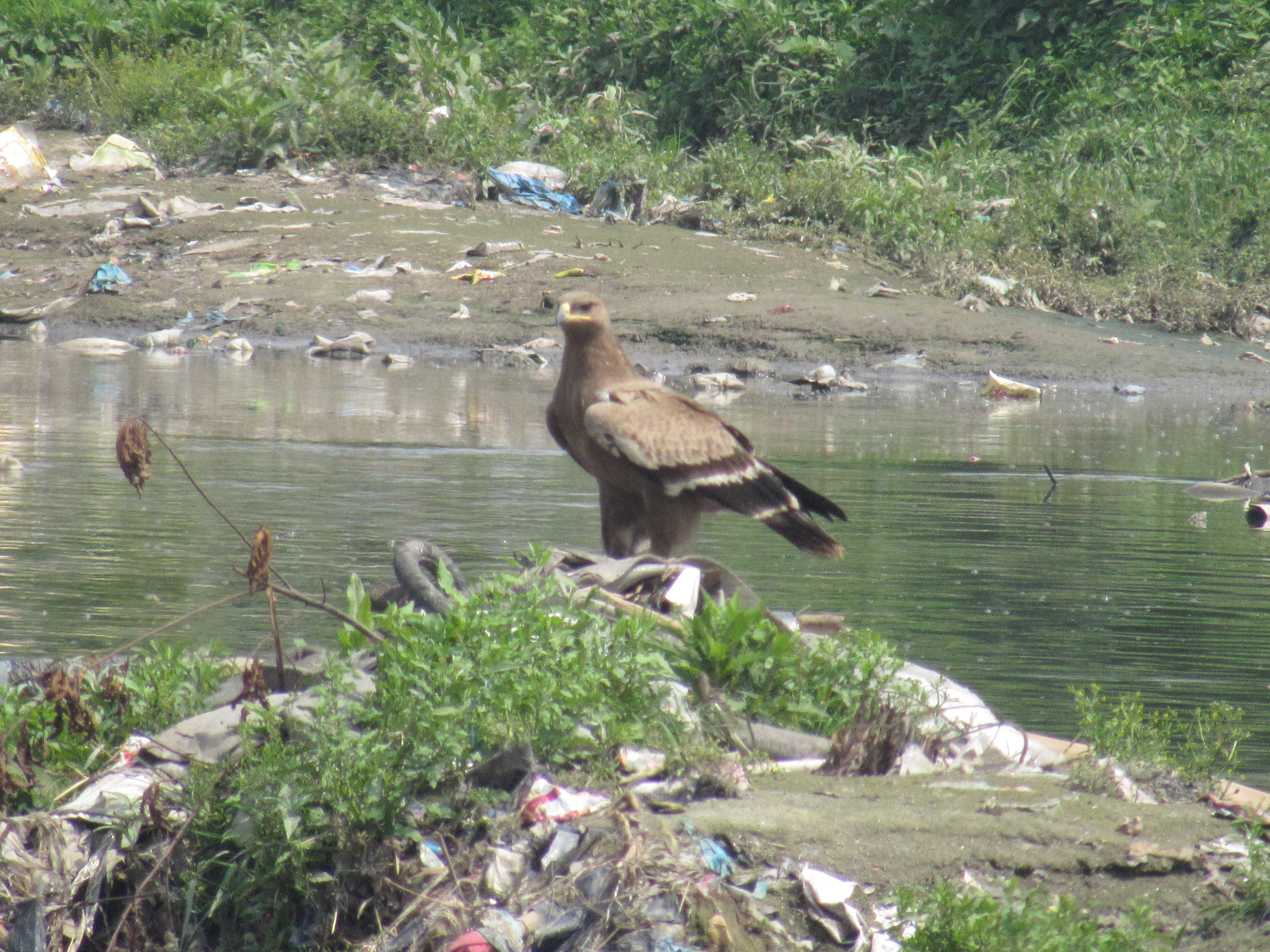
A steppe eagle appearing to scavenge amongst a garbage dump; among all Aquila eagles, it appears to have the least discerning diet and least predatory demeanor.

In the region of Bharatpur, Rajasthan, largely around Keoladeo National Park, the foraging activities of steppe eagles have been observed extensively. The steppe eagles seldom actively hunted, instead alternating between capturing nestlings from the heronries, especially nearly fledgling-age young of late nesting painted storks (Mycteria leucocephala), and engaging in kleptoparasitism towards other birds of prey, often doing so in groups of about three to nine eagles. More infrequently, steppe eagles in Bharatpur have been seen hunting flocking birds, fish (usually stranded), lizards and snakes. The steppes have been observed feeding on freshly killed young water birds at Bharatpur at daybreak and during early mornings and so may hunt while taking advantage of bright moonlight. Piracy against other raptors often resulted in food wastage, since the steppe eagles often forced the other raptors to drop their catch but the steppes were unable to intercept them and the kills were frequently lost into the water. In Bharatpur, the steppe eagles tended to perch relatively low compared to other eagles, at about 9 to 10 m (30 to 33 ft) in the trees, and to perch often for longer periods than other raptors, apparently while watching closely the activity of the other birds of prey. Of a total of 49 observed hours of activity for steppe eagles in Bharatpur, 45% of it was spent foraging, with a maximum foraging time of 69% during January, then reduced in March to only 17%. The daily food intake of individual steppe eagles was extremely low relative to their size, at only 141 g (5.0 oz). Instead of piracy, the steppe eagles often engaged each other in what can be considered a play display, almost exclusively between juvenile steppe eagles. In it, two birds circled 100 m (330 ft) or more, the higher bird circling closer and dropping toward the lower bird with extended feet, forcing it to roll over and present talons, they either immediately disengage with or without locking talons or descend looked for a few metres before separating; often steppes will fly purposely at a conspecific that is circling and fly up to a higher position so it can drop onto the other; in another incident, a steppe grabbed a plastic bag and let it go buffeting by the wind, then repeatedly caught it and let it go again, ultimately being joined by 5–6 other steppes in the "game'.

Less study has been conducted on feeding habits of the wintering and migrating steppe eagles in the Asia Minor, Middle East and Arabian Peninsula. What is known suggests that they, even more strongly than wintering steppe eagles in Indian subcontinent, today frequent various waste food sources inadvertently provided to them by humans. In Muscat, Oman, migrants largely from Kazakhstan were recorded to live off a mixture of refuse from the region's main landfill and large-scale carcass dump sites. As in the carcass dump areas of the Indian subcontinent, these carcass dumps often host a wide array of large birds of prey, both migrating species and non-migratory ones. In keeping with its size, steppe eagles dominated slightly smaller eagles and vultures and were in turn dominated by slightly larger eagles and much larger vultures. High use of slaughterhouses and cattle dump sites was recorded in winter in Iran. Interestingly, the Iranian slaughterhouses and dump sites hosted no first-year juveniles and few adults, but many steppe eagles either aged to 2 to 3 years of age (62.5%) or 4 to 5 years of age (33.3%). Foraging in both dump sites and available wetlands has been recorded in Iraq as well. Incidental feeding observations from Armenia suggests that steppe eagles in passage and in winter there are able to capture large quantities of voles or pirate them or similar small prey from smaller species of birds of prey.

=== Interspecific predatory relationships ===
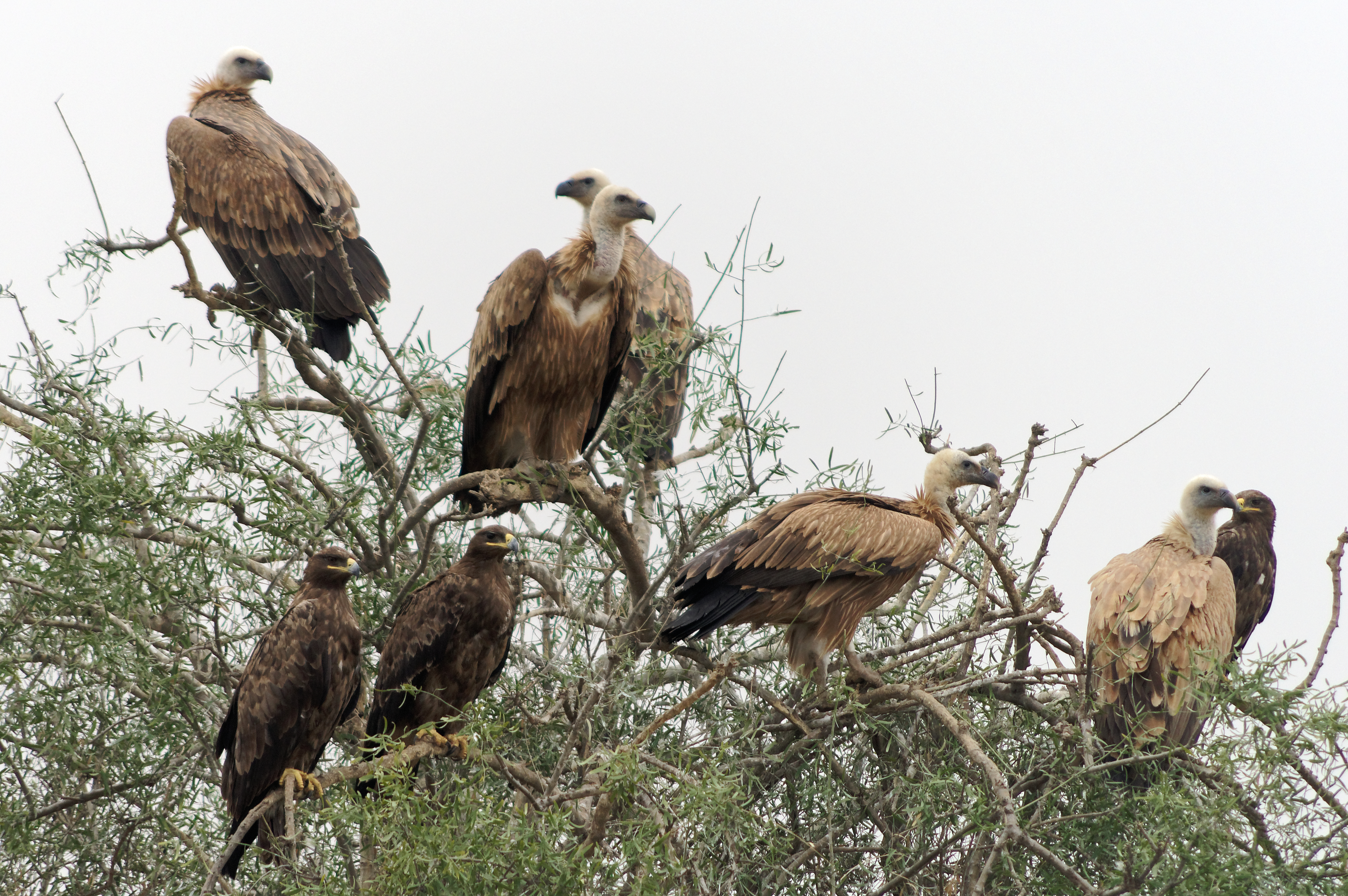
Three steppe eagles seen perched near an Indian carcass dump with another large scavenging bird, the griffon vulture.

The steppe eagle shares its distribution with several other birds of prey that can compete for resources. Most similar in feeding niche are largely other eagles, many of which are also similarly migratory. One eagle of similar central distribution is the eastern imperial eagles. The imperial eagle has a similar morphology and can broadly overlap in food selection. It also takes many ground squirrels but is generally less specialized on them during breeding, and often takes similar or larger numbers of prey such as hares, hedgehogs, hamsters and assorted birds both large and medium. In general, the dietary biology is better understood, prey is taken of more diverse sizes and the prey spectrum is far more diverse (perhaps nearly three times as many recorded prey species) in the imperial species. The average weight taken of prey like young marmots is similar in both eagles, averaging 1.5 kg (3.3 lb) in the eastern imperial while the steppe also takes marmots of around this size. Although not common, the imperial eagle can sometimes take prey weighing over 2 kg (4.4 lb), probably rather more frequently than the steppe eagle. It is possible that the steppe eagle gained the preference for relatively more numerous and social but quite small mammals as prey to avoid heavier competition over slightly larger but often more dispersed terrestrial mammals (i.e. hares, hedgehogs, etc.), especially those taken by imperial eagles. Also, the imperial eagle is rather more predatory in food obtainment while wintering, not infrequently eschewing the more vulnerable nestling water birds in the Indian subcontinent to take many adult birds such as waterfowl and coots. The eastern imperial eagle differs most significantly from steppe eagles in nesting habits, favoring tall trees, sometimes in fairly well-wooded areas, which quite contrary to the steppe eagles ground nesting preferences. The migratory course used by imperial eagles is largely the same as the steppe eagle but the imperial is the far less numerous migrant (also more frequently overwintering near their breeding ground) and radiates less far in winter (especially in Africa). Despite the steppe eagle averaging scarcely smaller, data from both breeding and wintering areas indicates that the imperial eagle tends to be behaviorally dominant over steppe eagles. This has manifested in full or partial displacement of steppe eagles locally using pylons as nesting sites by imperial eagles. Furthermore, at shared feeding sites, the steppe eagle tends to back down to the imperial eagle, often allowing it to feed first despite occasional displacement of imperials with full crops. On occasion, in India, steppe eagles succeed in pirating prey from imperial eagles, normally in cooperating parties of steppe eagles. In at least one case in India, the steppe eagle was the aggressor in an interaction with an eastern imperial eagle, causing the two eagles to lock talons and cartwheel down with uncertain results. While the eagles are expected to correspond their sizes in hierarchy when nests are located in the same general area, with the steppe considered as generally subordinate to the imperial which is itself subordinate to the golden eagle, interactions in the Altai region suggest a more complex interspecific relationship. There one study reported several aggressive interactions with both imperial and golden eagles and the steppes were surprisingly the aggressors in each. In one instance, a golden eagle was fiercely attacked by a steppe eagle who appeared to dominate the interaction, grabbing the more formidable-armed golden in air and driving it forcefully to the ground (although the golden eagle was not killed).

Much has been written about what separates the steppe from the tawny eagle but little to no interactions between the species have been noted in the wild. Beyond being strongly allopatric, wintering steppe eagles usually use slightly different habitats, favoring available wetlands quite apart from the arid wooded savanna and semi-desert areas preferred by tawny eagles. The tawny eagle, despite being smaller and proportionately similar in talon size (with a considerably less massive gape), is a rather more powerful and bold predator than the steppe eagle, alternating between capturing relatively large prey, pirating prey from other raptors and scavenging on carrion. The prey sizes taken by tawny eagles are perhaps the most evenly distributed across all weight classes besides the eastern imperial and golden eagles amongst Aquila and Clanga species, with a focus on prey weighing from 0.5 to 4 kg (1.1 to 8.8 lb), i.e. well over the typical prey sizes for steppe eagles in any area. Tawny eagles occasionally attend the same food sources as wintering steppes, such as carcass dumps, other carrion and termite alates, and appear to largely ignore each other; on the other hand, an assertive steppe can sometimes displace a tawny eagle. Apart from imperial eagles, steppe eagles were said to be dominant over other Aquila eagles and spotted eagles in the guild of raptors in Bharatpur. The steppe eagle is quite similar to the lesser and greater spotted eagles in migratory behaviour, but tends to specialize on entirely different prey during breeding. The spotted eagles tend to nest in well-wooded areas near water and catch diverse prey, although usually focus on fairly small prey as does the steppe eagle. The mean prey sizes taken by greater spotted eagles, with a diet often focused on various water-friendly rodents and medium-sized birds, is probably quite similar to that of the steppe eagles, whilst that of lesser spotteds, focused on voles, frogs and small snakes, is expectedly smaller. Especially in Africa, lesser spotted eagles become locally specialized termite eaters very much like the steppe eagle. Spotted eagles appear to be almost invariably dominated by steppe eagle, as has been recorded at carcass dumps during winter. In Bharatpur, spotted eagles species (Indian and greater) are quite often the targets of piracy by steppe eagles. Egyptian vultures (Neophron percnopterus) appear to be subordinate to steppe eagles at carrion but most other vultures are larger (sometimes considerably so) and may be avoided by steppe eagles, although they often fed at carcass dumps alongside assorted vultures. Many other diurnal raptors may share the ground squirrel and other prey that the steppe eagle often subsists on but are generally less specialized and tend to use different nesting habits, usually nesting in trees. These may include saker falcons (Falco cherrug), long-legged buzzards and other buzzards while larger golden eagles and smaller upland buzzards (Buteo hemilasius) often nests in rocks at considerably more elevated altitudes (although the golden may too nest in trees and other habitats).

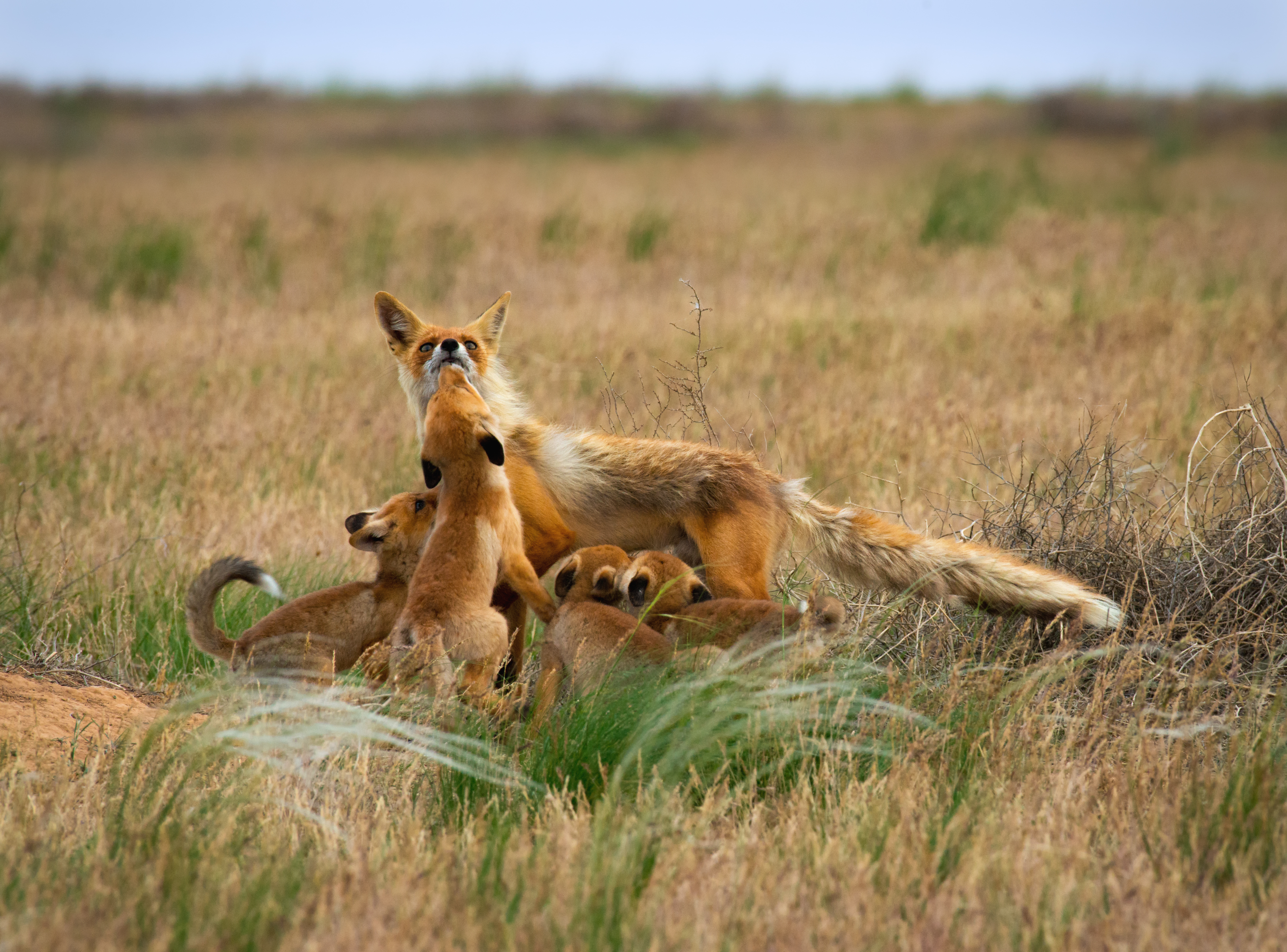
Red fox make their home in the steppe habitat quite often (as seen) and both the steppe eagle and fox are known to threaten each other, especially the young of the other predator.

Smaller raptors like harriers are often the only other diurnal birds of prey to regularly nest on the ground and may co-occur over much of the range of steppe eagles, although usually use damper parts of the steppe as nesting habitats than the eagles. Harriers also often use similar migration routes as do the steppe eagles. In Africa, steppe eagles are often found feeding peaceably in the midst of the numerous yellow-billed kite (Milvus aegyptius) on termites. However, when interactions are of a more competitive nature, the steppe eagle tends to dominate any species of kite. Other raptors both large and small are not infrequently the victims of kleptoparasitism by steppe eagles. In India, Brahminy kites (Haliastur indus), black kites (Milvus migrans), laggar falcons (Falco juggar), Montagu's harrier (Circus pygargus) and western marsh harriers (Circus aeruginosus) among others were robbed of their catches as well as spotted and even tawny eagles. However, house crows (Corvus splendens) often robbed the steppe eagles. In Armenia, common buzzards and Montagu's harriers were seen to be robbed of catches by steppe eagles. Even the golden eagle has seen to have its prey be stolen by steppe eagles in the Bale Mountains.

Predatory interactions with other carnivorous animals where the steppe eagles are victims are largely restricted to the vulnerable young, with the nest sites often being highly vulnerable due to their often accessible positions on mildly elevated ground. Hungry canids are often particularly detrimental predators, particularly grey wolves (Canis lupus) and dogs (often herding and feral ones) and more infrequently red foxes and other carnivores like cats and their kin. An unexpected source of steppe eagle nestling mortality was found to be from the unusually aggressive pallid harrier (Circus macrourus) which attacked and killed two consecutive young eagles although never fed on them (possibly due to delayed displacement by the parent eagles). Apart from the vulnerable young on the nesting ground, steppe eagles appear to be seldom killed by natural predators. However, one was reported as the victim of a caracal (Caracal caracal) in Saudi Arabia (probably in a nighttime ambush). More often, the steppe eagle is the predator rather than victim in deadly contests against other predators. Besides the many aforementioned accounts of prey including carnivores like mustelids and foxes, steppe eagles can also on occasion kill other raptorial birds and seems to consider even quite formidable species as viable prey. In the Karaganda region alone, the local steppe eagles were recorded to prey on lesser kestrels (Falco naumanni), long-legged buzzards, Eurasian eagle-owls (Bubo bubo) and seven short-eared owls (Asio flammeus). In the Altai region, in addition to eagle-owls, the black kite has also been recorded as steppe eagle prey. In fact, the steppe eagle apparently is the only bird to have preyed upon Eurasian eagle-owls besides the golden eagle on multiple occasions. Although rarely observed to halt movements or to eat while migrating in Israel, one steppe eagle was seen to suddenly strike down and consume an adult common buzzard while both species were in passage there. A Brahminy kite that was seen attempting to mob a steppe eagle in Tamil Nadu was observed to be killed by the eagle, while at least one other Brahminy there was also injured by an aggressive steppe eagle.

== Breeding ==
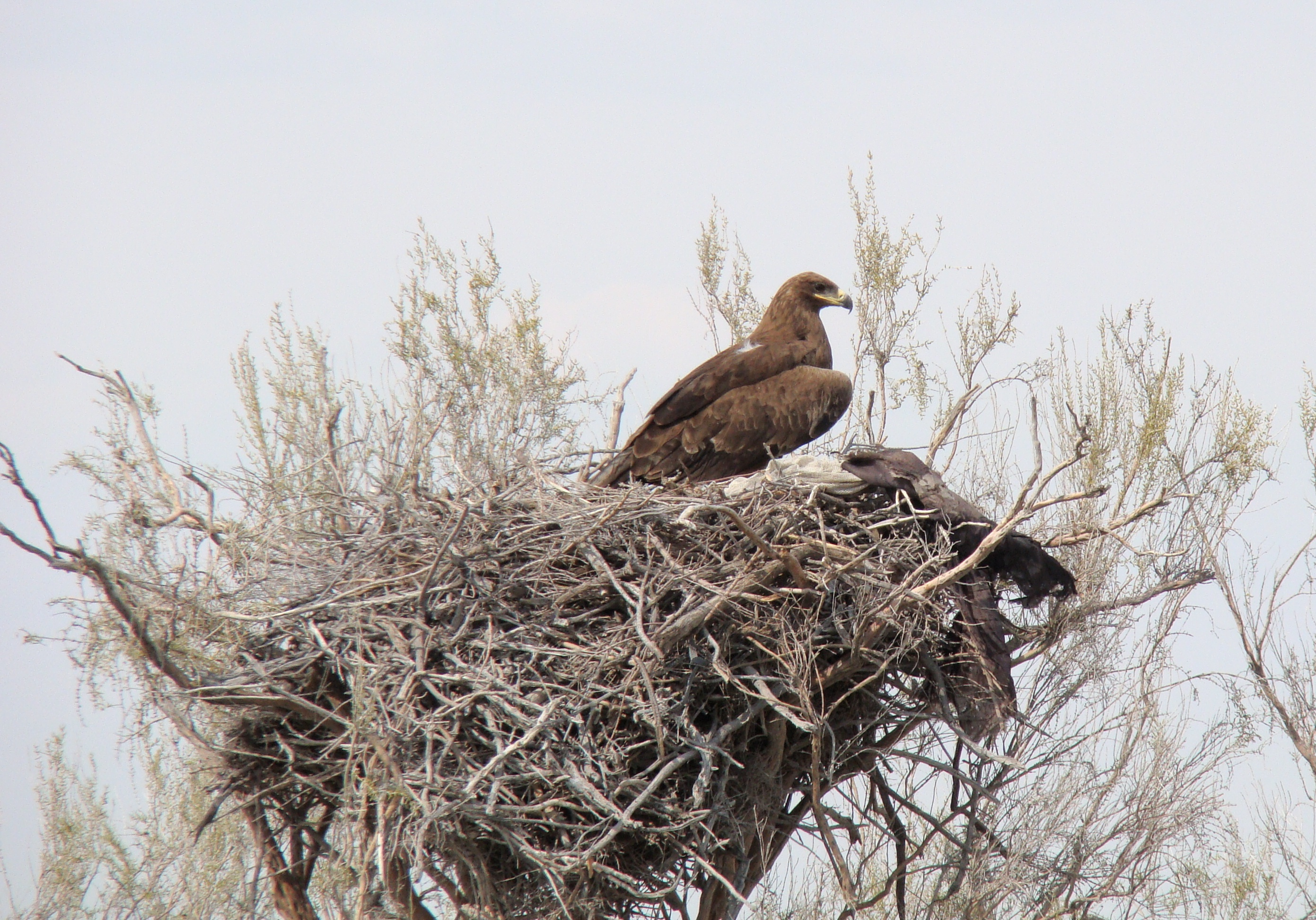
An adult steppe eagle on its nest in Baikonur.

The steppe eagle, like most raptors, breeds in pairs. Otherwise, it displays a preference for solitude whilst summering on the steppe. Like other Aquila eagles, this species may engage in a territorial aerial display. The display of the steppe eagle is not well-known but can be assumed to resemble that of sympatric eagles and is known to include high circling (but perhaps engage in less aerial acrobatics than other Aquila). In Kalmykia, the mean number of pairs per 100 km^{2} (39 sq mi) was 1.7. The steppe eagle is rare in the Saratov area, with peak areas such as Alexandrovo-Gaysky District, Novouzensky District, Saint Petersburg and Ozinsky District hold a mean of about 3 pairs per 100 km^{2} (39 sq mi) while elsewhere in Saratov, the mean number of pairs per that area is about 0.8. Nearest neighbor distance in Transbaikal averaged 6.61 km (4.11 mi). 85 nests in the Altai foothills were found to distanced at a mean of 2,040 m (6,690 ft) although not all of the nests were occupied. In the Ukok Plateau (within the Altais), the mean nearest neighbor distance was found to be 3.15 km (1.96 mi), ranging from 1.09 to 8.06 km (0.68 to 5.01 mi). Another study of the Altai found that there were about 0.51 to 3.11 pairs per 100 km^{2} (39 sq mi) with a number of successful pairs of 0.35–1.35 per this area, and further more found that Khakassia and Krasnoyarsk Krai contained higher nesting densities but that the Tvya Republic contained lowered densities. This study found that in Altai that the mean nearest neighbor distance was on average 4.91 km (3.05 mi), ranging from 1.91 to 17.4 km (1.19 to 10.81 mi). In the borderlands between Kazakhstan and Russia, i.e. Aktobe and Orenburg, there was an estimated 7.1 pairs per 100 km^{2} (39 sq mi). In the southern part of the Aktobe region, such as between Bayganin District and Miyaly, the density of nesting steppes can occasionally reach as high as 2-2.5 pairs per 1 km^{2} (0.39 sq mi). In the Atyrau Region of Kazakhstan, nests on utility towers were spaced at a mean of around 5.3 km (3.3 mi) as opposed to around 10 to 15 km (6.2 to 9.3 mi) apart on other nesting substrates. In the Aral and Caspian areas of Kazakhstan, the mean nearest neighbor distance was 6.31 km (3.92 mi) but the density of breeding pairs varied more than 50 fold based on habitat, with locally cliff habitat being the least productive and clay semi-desert the most productive. Within the Karaganda Region, the mean number of pairs per 100 km^{2} (39 sq mi) was 7.67 while the numbers of successful pairs per such an area was 3.24. In Xinjiang, home ranges were found to range in size from 4.5 to 54 km^{2} (1.7 to 20.8 sq mi). The breeding season falls from late March or early April (occasionally not starting in earnest until late April) to roughly late August, although several steppe eagles can remain on their breeding grounds until at least October.

=== Nests ===
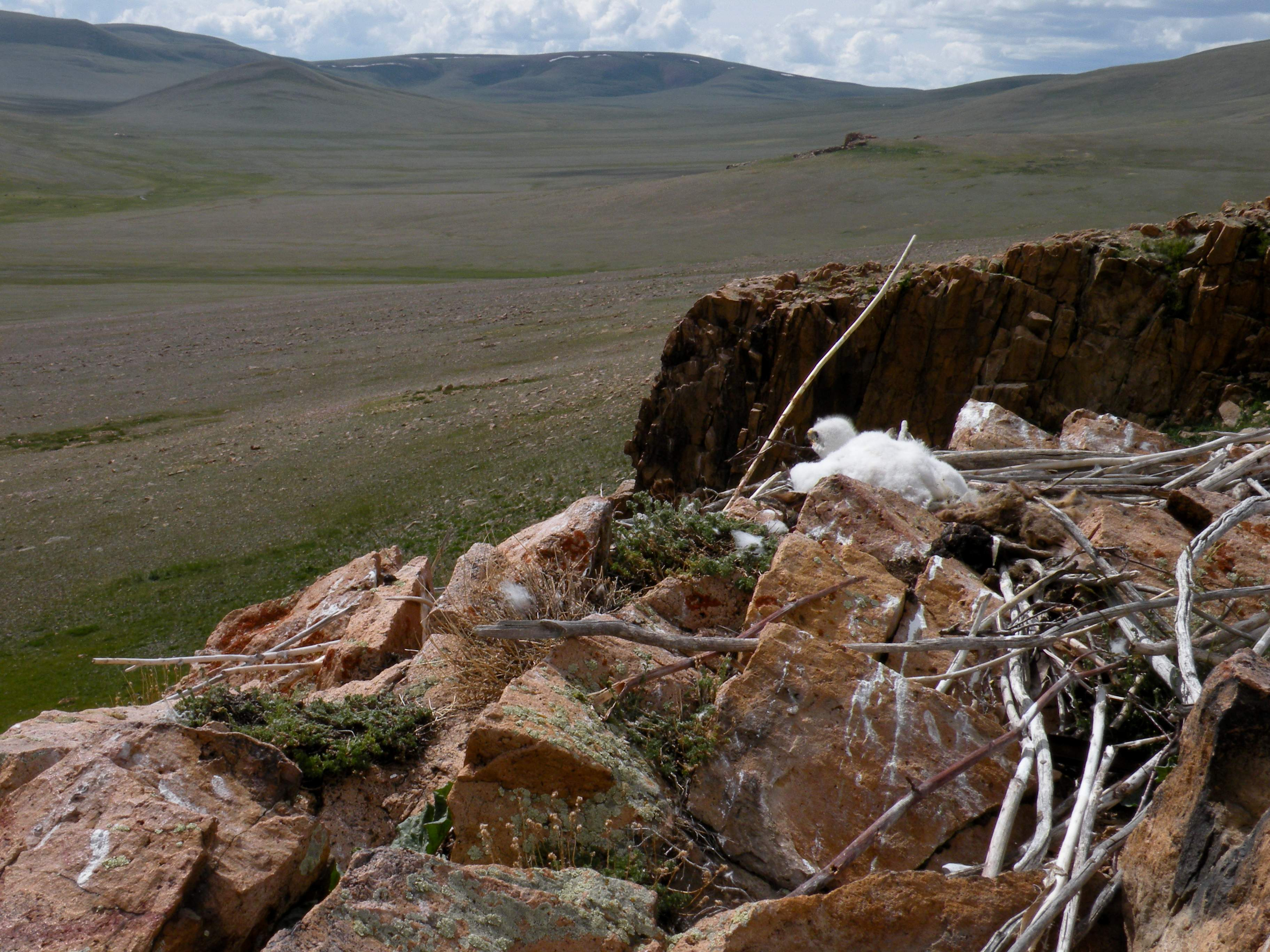
Elevated portions of land, whether rocky or not, are the typical nesting site for steppe eagles.

The nest is a large stick platform, varying greater in size based on available materials but averaging flatter than those of other Aquila eagles, excepting the tawny eagle. Most nests are around 70 to 100 cm (28 to 39 in) in diameter and around 20 to 50 cm (7.9 to 19.7 in) deep. Nests in the Transbaikal averaged 118 cm (46 in) across with nests located on cliffs or rocks getting larger at up to 50 to 85 cm (20 to 33 in) deep. In the Sarastov area, 14 nests measured on average 92 cm (36 in) in diameter by 27 cm (11 in) in depth, with ranges of 80 to 125 cm (31 to 49 in) and 15 to 35 cm (5.9 to 13.8 in), respectively. Nests in Xinjiang could diameters of as much as 180 cm (71 in). The largest nest in the southern Aktobe region reached a diameter of 2.4 m (7.9 ft); while height of the nest could vary there from 10 to 90 cm (3.9 to 35.4 in) those in trees could reach up to 80 to 106 cm (31 to 42 in). The nest is generally lined with twigs and much clutter. This is due to sparser nesting material in their habitat, so nest structures frequently include peculiar items: paper, polyethylene bags, pieces of wool and manure, bones, feathers, old rags and other human refuse. The nest is traditionally place in an exposed site among stones, often on a hummock. Other nesting sites can include very low bushes and a spot on the ground which is usually raised slightly above the mean layout of the environment. Some other nest sites are known have including haystacks or ruins for a slight prominence, also sometimes on a non-steep cliff or rarely in a tree. Although some older studies claimed that steppe eagles avoided nesting near human activity this has been largely disproven. In Kalmykia, all nests were only 50 to 100 m (160 to 330 ft) from paved roads. A nest in the West Kazakhstan Region was found to be quite close to a village. However, in Transbaikal, the conversion of areas to farmland was a primary cause of a large population contraction for the eagles there. Of 14 nests in Kalmykia, 10 were located on the ground and 4 were in trees or shrubs, not to mention some located on transmission towers at a mean nest height of 11.7 m (38 ft). In Transbaikal, 53.7% of 47 nests were on hills. Those located on rocky outcrops in Transbaikal, averaged 1.95 m (6.4 ft) above the mean ground level. In the region of Lake Baskunchak, most of 16 nests found for the species were on rocky rubble and boulders, karst craters and cliffs, with two located on trees. In the Altai region, 62.4% of territories contained only one nest but 27.4% contained 1 alternate nests, 4.7% contained 2 alternate nests and 5.9% contained 3 alternate nests. A study in Altai determined that nests were often in virgin or fallow steppe near larch forests, and were often reused in subsequent years. The location of Altai nests were on gently sloping rocky outcrops, or cuesta escarpments, mostly, which were about 82% of known nest sites (with only 4% on flat ground) In the borderlands of Kazakhstan and Russia, of 418 total nests, 75.6% of nests were on ledges of rocks and boulders or quartz ridges and only 15.8% were on flat ground. Within the region of Atyrau in Kazakhstan, 26% of raptor nests located on electrical transmission towers (or pylons) were those of steppe eagles. 38% of nests in the Aral-Caspian region were either on pylons or at the base of them. In the Karaganda Region, 75.6% of nests were on outcrops and a further 10.84% were on rock disintegrations, and all nest sites had a rocky substrate (including a very small amount on low bushes as well). The Karaganda nests were at a mean elevation of 528.7 m (1,735 ft). In the general West Kazakhstan Region, of 286 nests 30.42% were on ground or rocks, 28.32% in trees or bushes and 27.27% on utility poles. The nests in the West Kazakh area that were on rocks and cliffs averaged 10.55 m (34.6 ft) above the ground, those on poles averaged 13 m (43 ft) above ground, in trees and those in bushes averaged 2.09 m (6.9 ft) above the ground. One nest near the Ili River was noted to be a small tree, Haloxylon, while another was a perhaps dangerously hot sandy dune. One successful nest near the Irtysh River was on the shrub Iberian meadowsweet (Spiraea hypericfolia) (while another unsuccessful one was on a thick growth of Lonicera tatarica). Another unusual Kazakh nest was on the ground with rather loamy grasslands that was probably unsafe due to excessive sun exposure (only blocked for 20% of the day) and a considerable local presence of red foxes. Of 49 nests found in Mongolia 47.8% were on the ground, 32.6% were on rock columns or large boulders, 8.7% on cliffs, 8.7% on artificial substrates, including a car tire, an abandoned car cabin and an artificial nest platform and 2.2% was in a tree. All Mongolian nest in this study were at elevations between 1,100 and 2,500 m (3,600 and 8,200 ft), with a mean of 1,415 m (4,642 ft). In Mongolia, the height of nests above the surrounding flat earth was 2.28 m (7.5 ft).

=== Eggs and incubation ===
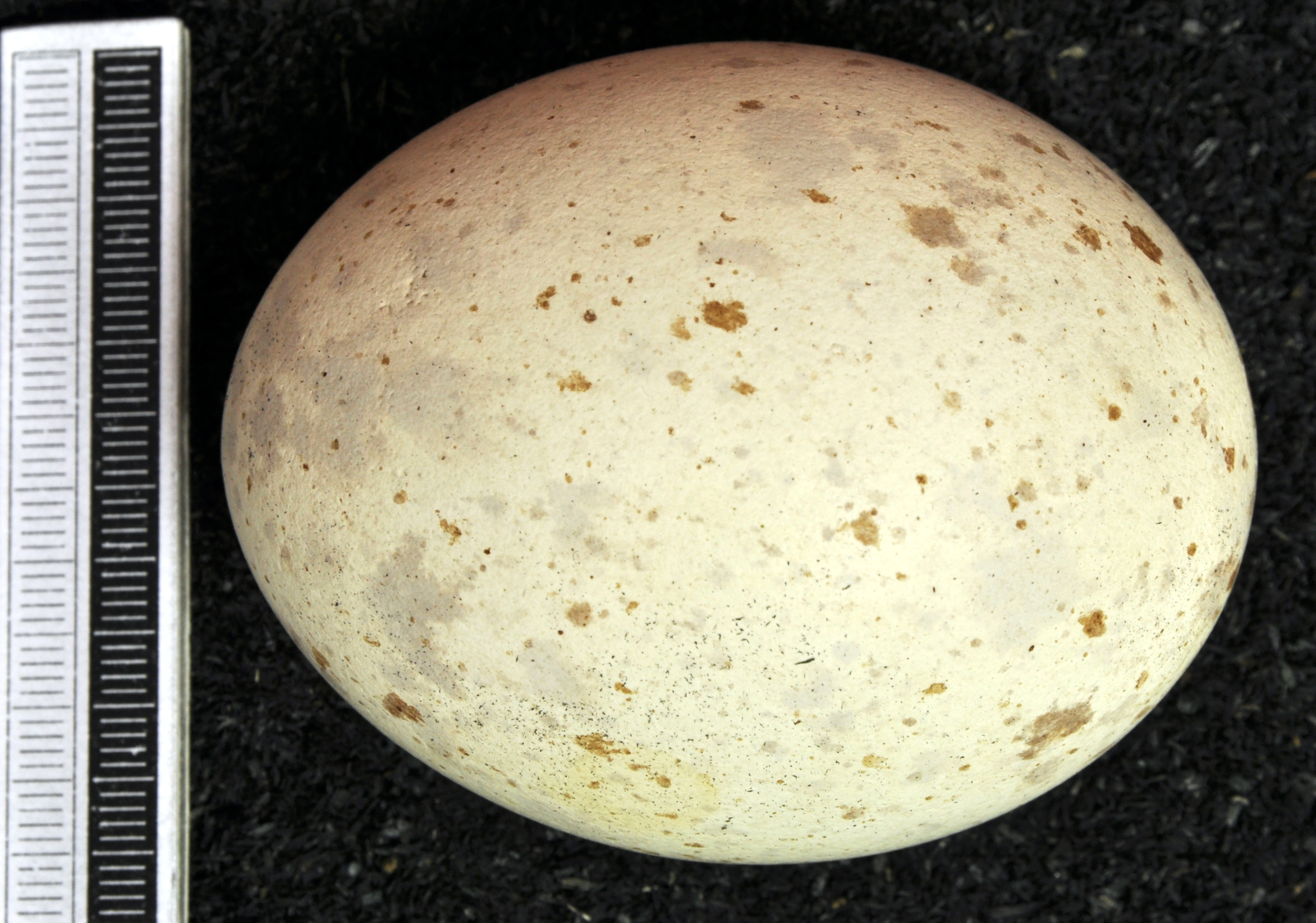
Egg, Collection Museum Wiesbaden

The clutch size is usually 2, i.e. from 1 to 3 with some clutches very rarely including as many as 4–5 eggs. The clutch averaged 2.38 in nests in the Aral-Caspian area. In Kalmykia, the mean clutch size was 2.31. In the Lake Baskunchak area, 66.7% of nests contained 2 eggs, 25% contained 3 and 8.3% contained 1. Out of 30 inhabited nests in the Transbaikal, 77% had 2 eggs, 20% had 1 egg and 3% had 3 eggs. In the Volga area, the average clutch size was 2.2. One study in Altai found the clutch size of a small sample averaged 1.67, while another placed the mean clutch size of 19 clutches was 2. Yet another Altai study found that clutch size in 32 active nests was 2.33. In Aktobe and Orenburg, the mean clutch size was 1.94. In western Kazakhstan, the clutch size average was 2.38, with up to 4 recorded; here 54.05% of clutches contained 2 eggs. The mean clutch size in study in Mongolia was 1.9, amongst 43 egg-laying pairs, 58.1% laid 2 eggs, 23.3% laid 1 and 18.6% laid 3. The eggs are largely off-white in colour but may have faint brown or grey spots. The mean egg size in Kalmykia was 66.52 mm × 53 mm (2.619 in × 2.087 in) with a range of 61.4 to 73.5 mm (2.42 to 2.89 in) in height and a range of 51.0 to 57.2 mm (2.01 to 2.25 in) in width. The average was similar in the Volga area, at 67.5 mm × 54.6 mm (2.66 in × 2.15 in), with ranges of 63.1 to 72.5 mm (2.48 to 2.85 in) by 52.1 by 55 mm (2.05 by 2.17 in). Eggs were larger in Transbaikal where they measured on average 72.5 mm × 57.7 mm (2.85 in × 2.27 in) and weighed a mean of 120.8 g (4.26 oz). Two eggs in Altai weighed 106 and 111 g (3.7 and 3.9 oz), respectively. The incubation stage lasts around 45 days, though may be up to week briefer in some cases. Hatching is often sometime in May, but can continue to early June.

=== Development of young and parental behaviour ===
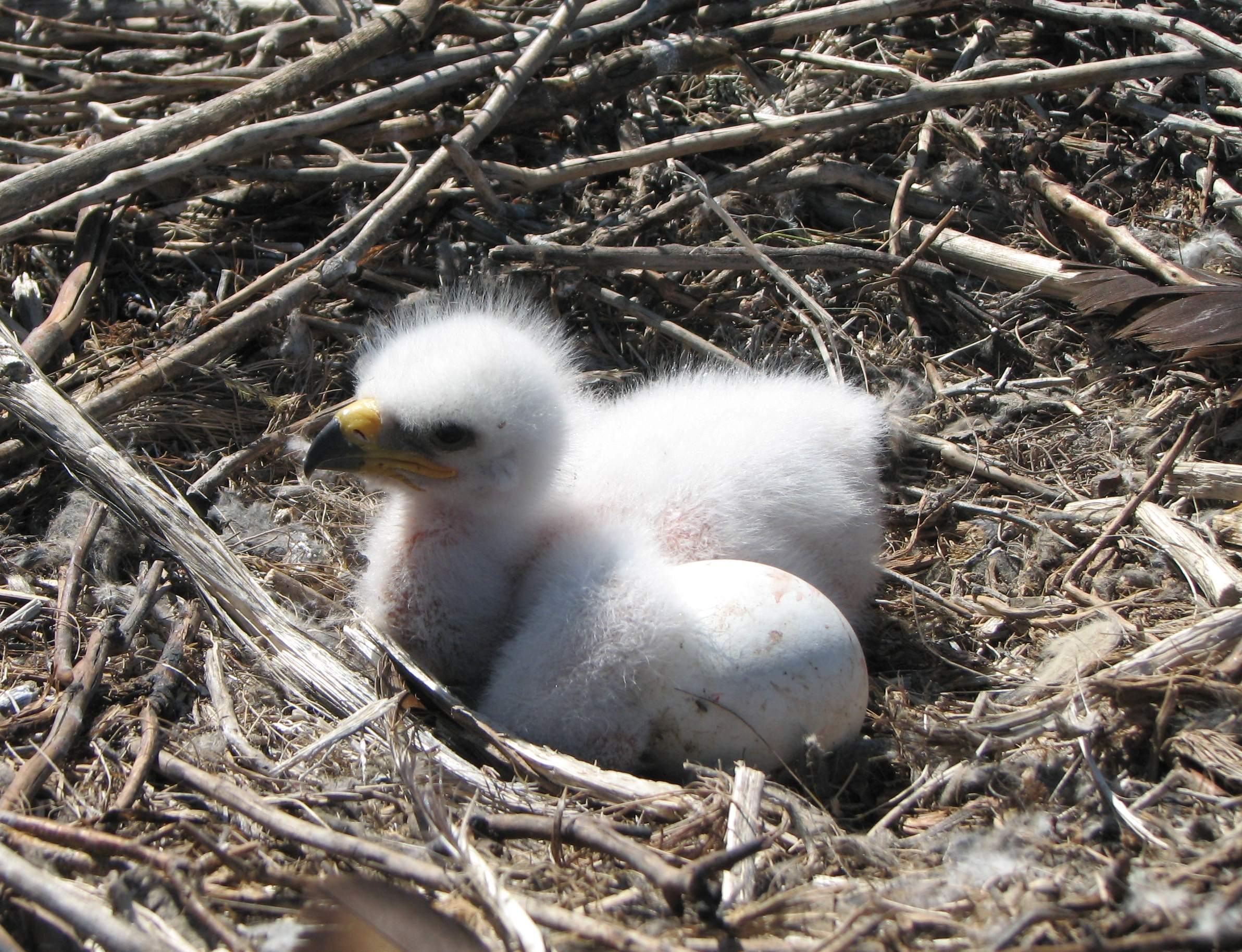
A lone young nestling steppe eagle in a Russian nest.

The brood size in Kalmykia averaged 1.64. As for Transbaikal, the average number of chick per occupied nest was 0.65 while, in the successful nests, the average was 1.38. In the Altai, the mean brood size was reported as 2 in a sample of 9 one year and 1.4 in a sample of 10 the next year. A different study of the Altai found that there was a mean brood size of 1.86 per successful nest (0.86 per all occupied nests). In the trans-border of Russia and Kazakhstan, the mean brood size per occupied nest was 1.03. The average brood size in the Aral-Caspian was 2.36. In the highlands of the East Kazakhstan Region, a mean of 1.9 eaglets were found in 15 occupied nests. In the west Kazakh region, the brood size average was 2.22. One study found that sex can be identified via morphometric measurements in 90% of cases and that the larger eastern populations of steppe eagle are conspicuously larger at all stages of development than the more westerly ones. The growth and development of a single chick in the Zhanybek District of Kazakhstan was well studied, in an area where little ground squirrels were broadly available (i.e. about 40 adults per ha). This eaglet weighed 119 g (4.2 oz) and was covered in white down on day 1 while, by day 6, it weighed 331 g (11.7 oz) and had down white as earlier but longer. By day 10, it weighed 602 g (1.327 lb) and by day 15 weighed 1,060 g (2.34 lb). At the age of 20 days, this eaglet weighed 1.65 kg (3.6 lb) and manifest much more conspicuous emerging brown feathers. Once aged 25 days, it weighed 2.01 kg (4.4 lb) and had juvenile feathers over a third of its body and by day 30 it weighed 2.3 kg (5.1 lb). By day 35, it weighed 2.7 kg (6.0 lb) and was almost all brown but with down still about the head. Full body size and juvenile plumage (but for fully-developed wing and tail feathers) was attained at 40–43 days for the chick, it weighed 2.9 kg (6.4 lb); although fully grown, it still crouched down at threats and could not fly. Similar growth was tracked in Xinjiang, where it was noted that around 20 days of age, the young could standing, wing flap frequently at 45 days and move about the nest vicinity somewhat and could at 60 days old eat unaided. In one case near the Irtysh River, when a nest was approached by humans, the eldest eaglet was seen to aggressively display and try to displace them while it appeared to protect its two young siblings, which sheltered behind it. The fledging of the young eagles occurs relatively quickly at somewhere between 55 and 65 days, due probably to the vulnerability of the nest sites, quickly leaving the nest is probably advantages to avoid dangers peculiar to these eagles nest like predators, wildfires, cattle-trampling, humans and so on. Usually, the second fledgling initially flies somewhat later and more clumsily than the first. The difference in fledgling times from the first to the second fledgling was recorded to be 8 to 10 days in Transbaikal. The mother steppe eagle in Kalmykia is not as tight a sitter as other Aquila eagles tend to be and flushed when approached within 50 to 100 m (160 to 330 ft) and may too take a relatively long time to return. However, here the females were highly tolerant of automobiles. Along the Irtysh River in Kazakhstan, although steppe eagles flushed when approached within 100 m (330 ft) they did not depart for long and returned quickly for this species relative to other reports. Those nesting in Atyrau on utility towers allowed approach to within 20 m (66 ft) via car. In the southern Aktobe region, the steppe eagles appear almost desensitized to humans, probably due to extensive exposure unlike in more remote areas, and allowed approach via motorcycle to within 3 to 4 m (9.8 to 13.1 ft) but flushed if a person was on foot within 5 m (16 ft). Levels of hemoparasites appear to be low in nestling steppe eagles but the sample sizes of the only study known so far are small.

=== Nesting success rates ===
Out of 10 nests in two locations in Kalmykia, alarmingly, 7 contained dead embryos that never hatched. Thus, the breeding success rate here was quite low at 30–40%. Study from the Altai region determined that than occupied nests produced an average of 1.52 fledglings. Within the Ukok Plateau part of the Altais, 31.6% of 19 checked nests were found to be successful. The mean number of fledglings in Mongolia per nest was 0.9 with a fledgling success rate of 42.2%, with no strong annual variations. Nest located on cliffs were more successful in Mongolia, the reasons inferred were greater protection from the elements and from predators, while for those nesting on artificial substrates, the success rate was lower (37.5%). Of 30 failures recorded in Mongolia, 37.5% were due to desertion by the parents, 16.7% due to infertile eggs, 6.7% due to predation (possibly from wolves and common ravens (Corvus corax)), 10% due to starvation, 3.3% from cannibalism and the remaining 26.7% from unknown causes. In the Lake Baskunchak area, several nests were abandoned due to reportedly accidental human intrusions. Study in Xinjiang indicated that about two-thirds of nesting attempts by steppe eagles there appear to fail. In Tuva, the dictating factors of nesting success were considered habitat quality, food supply, disturbance levels, and the ability to rapidly change home ranges as habitats were unnaturally altered via the felling of tall trees. Starvation and dehydration seem to be leading causes of chick mortality in Lake Baskunchak. In the Orenburg region, 41.1% of nestling mortality was due to starvation (after a decline of the little ground squirrel), 38.3% due to steppe fires, human disturbance at just under 10% and more minor causes were parental inexperience and predation. Among active nests in the Karaganda Region, as of 2017, 42.26% were successful and a high rate of 54.46% completely failed, producing 0.61 fledglings per occupied nest and 1.45 per successful nest. Many Karaganda nests were noted to include infertile eggs, while many nests were destroyed in steppe fires. A follow-up study 2 years later found even more severe nest failure rates, with only 28.42% of nests succeeding. The reduction of the number of occupied nests here was 18.9% and by number of successful nests, the reduction was 63.9%. The breeding of a large quantity of visibly younger eagles in a breeding population is generally thought to indicate stress on the population of a raptor species. The steppe eagle, in sync with its overall decline, has shown an alarming increase of subadult specimens breeding. In Kalmykia, the number of breeding subadults increased from 1.75% prior to 5.26% during the 2011–2015 period. This is a relatively small amount of breeding underaged eagles compared to some other populations. In the Aral and Caspian areas, 39.62% of 58 breeding pairs contained 1 subadult breeding bird of around 3–5 years of age. Similarly, within the Ukok Plateau, only 23.8% of 67 sighted steppe eagle were mature adults, indicating the reduction of mature individuals is similarly severe there. Subadult breeding steppe eagles were also noticed in Mongolia.

== Status ==
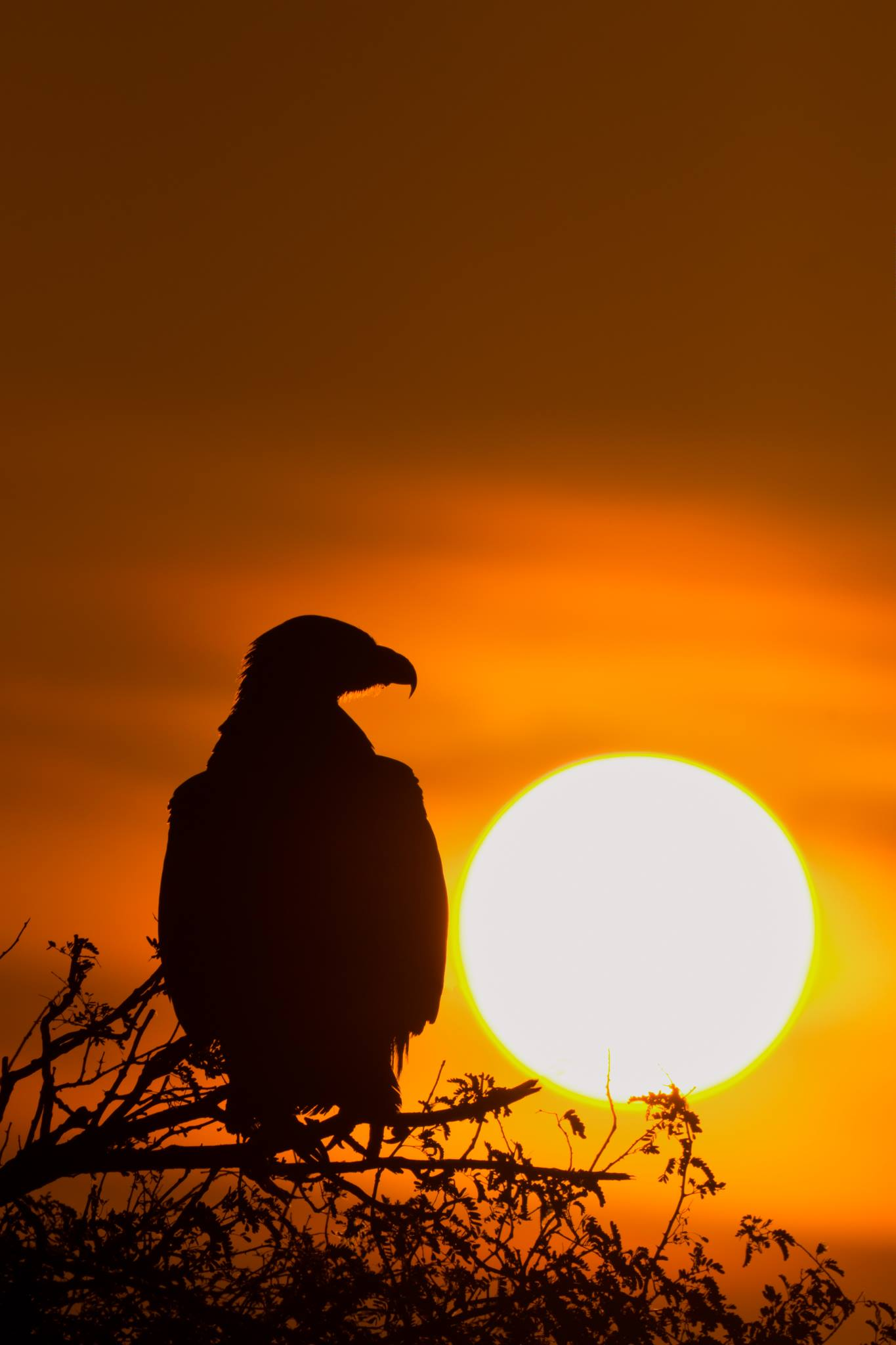
A steppe eagle and the sunrise in Tal Chhapar Sanctuary

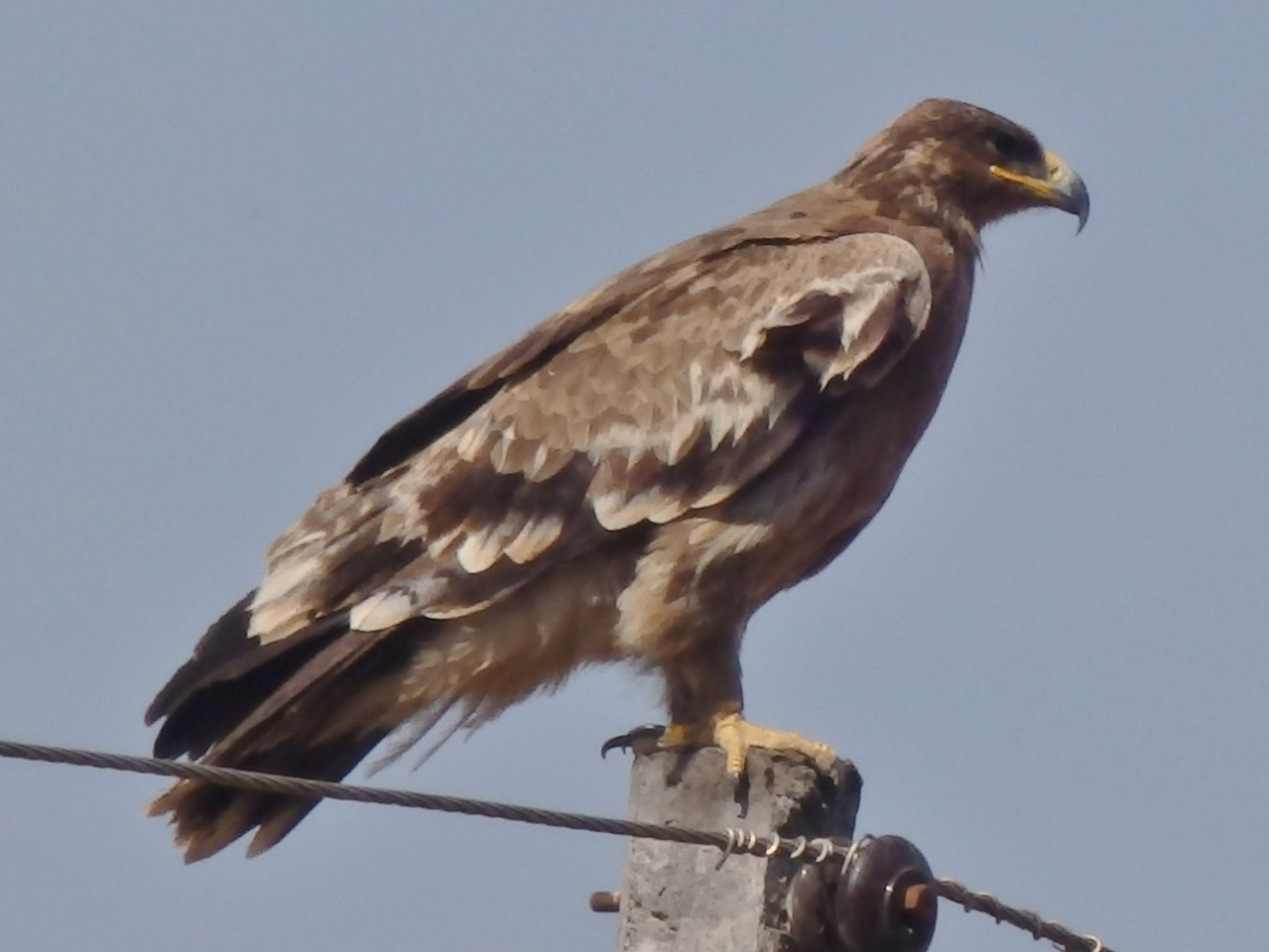
Powerline electrocutions are depleting the population of steppe eagles in many parts of the range.

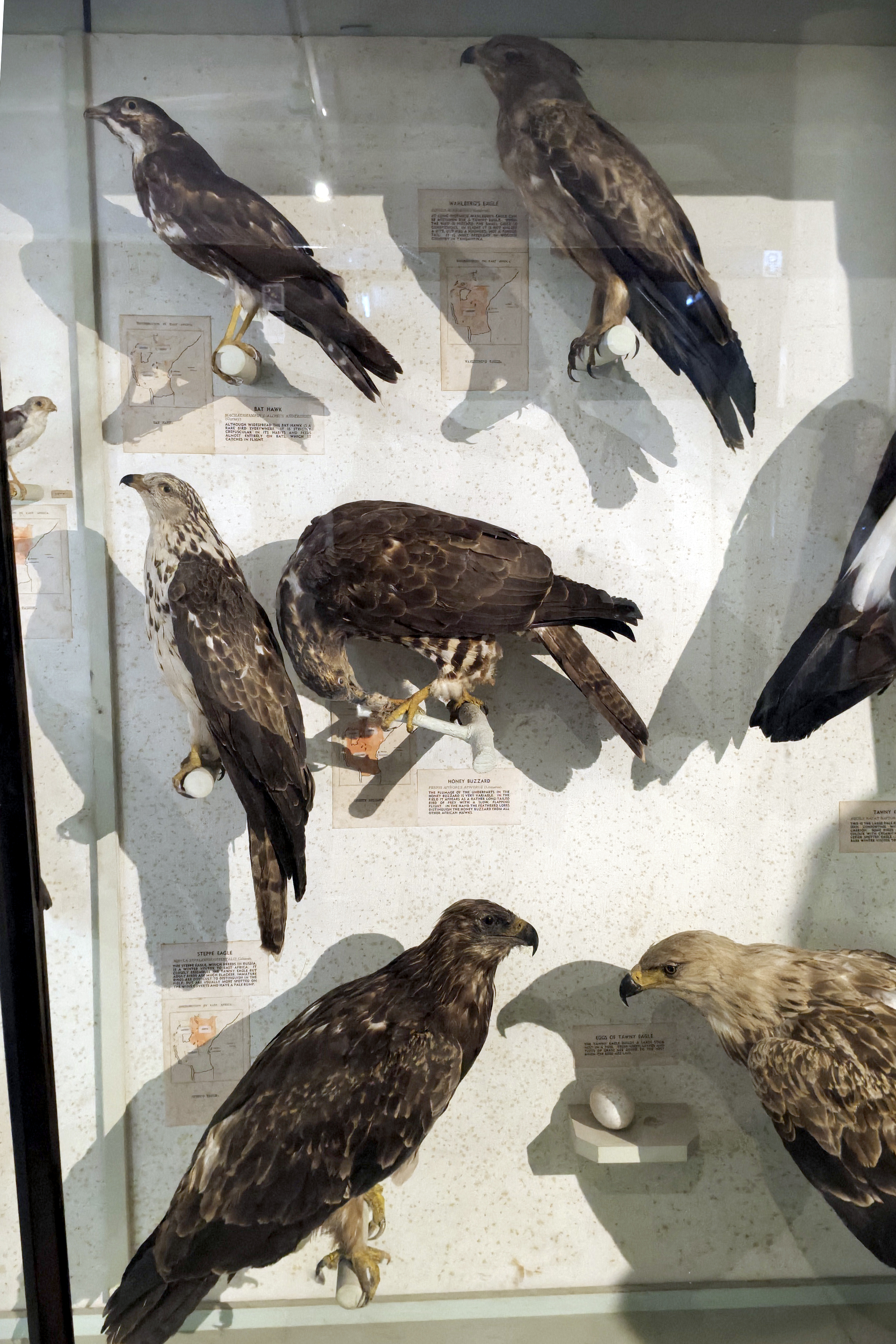
Bird taxidermy at Nairobi National Museum

Densities of steppe eagles vary greatly both regionally and annually. This species has specialized food requirements, making this species more dependent on food availability than many other raptors. European Russia in the 1990s was estimated to hold up to 20,000 pairs while steppe eagles were considered very rare in some parts of breeding range (i.e. central-south Siberia). Even in recent decades, the steppe eagle has been considered easily one of the most numerous migrating eagles in the world. The species has largely been regarded as "widespread and common" in winter in Indian subcontinent. Estimates of the world population were projected based on the total breeding range encompasses over 8,000,000 km^{2} (3,100,000 sq mi) and average density very roughly of 50 km^{2} (19 sq mi), which would put the population would be in six figures, but density were perceived to be slightly lower (i.e. 1 pair/100 km^{2} (39 sq mi)) gives a total of 80,000 breeding pairs. A refined and more recent estimate of the global population posited that there were 53,000–86,000 remaining breeding pairs globally for steppe eagles, with 43,000–59,000 pairs estimated in Kazakhstan, 2000–3000 estimated in Russia, 6000–13,000 estimated in Mongolia, and 2000–6000 estimated in China. This study projects the global number to be between 185,000 and 344,000 individuals at peak times, which is the end of the breeding season, with only 17,700–43,000 remaining adults. The Aral-Caspian area is estimated to hold about 5742–7548 breeding pairs (51% of which are thought to breed in Uzbekistan, the remainder in Kazakhstan). Post-breeding, the Aral-Caspian is thought to hold about 10,000–14,000 individuals. It is thought that the West Kazakhstan Region and Kalmykia region are the epicenter of the world population, holding the maximum genetic diversity (via haplotype) in the world, with the genetic diversity narrowing farther east in the breeding range. The Altai and Sayan region is thought to hold 43–51% of the current breeding population of steppe eagles in Russia, with the Altai Republic estimated to hold 270–280 breeding pairs. A slight recovery has been noted in the Tuva Basin, going up to as much as 200–300 pairs between 2008 and 2014.

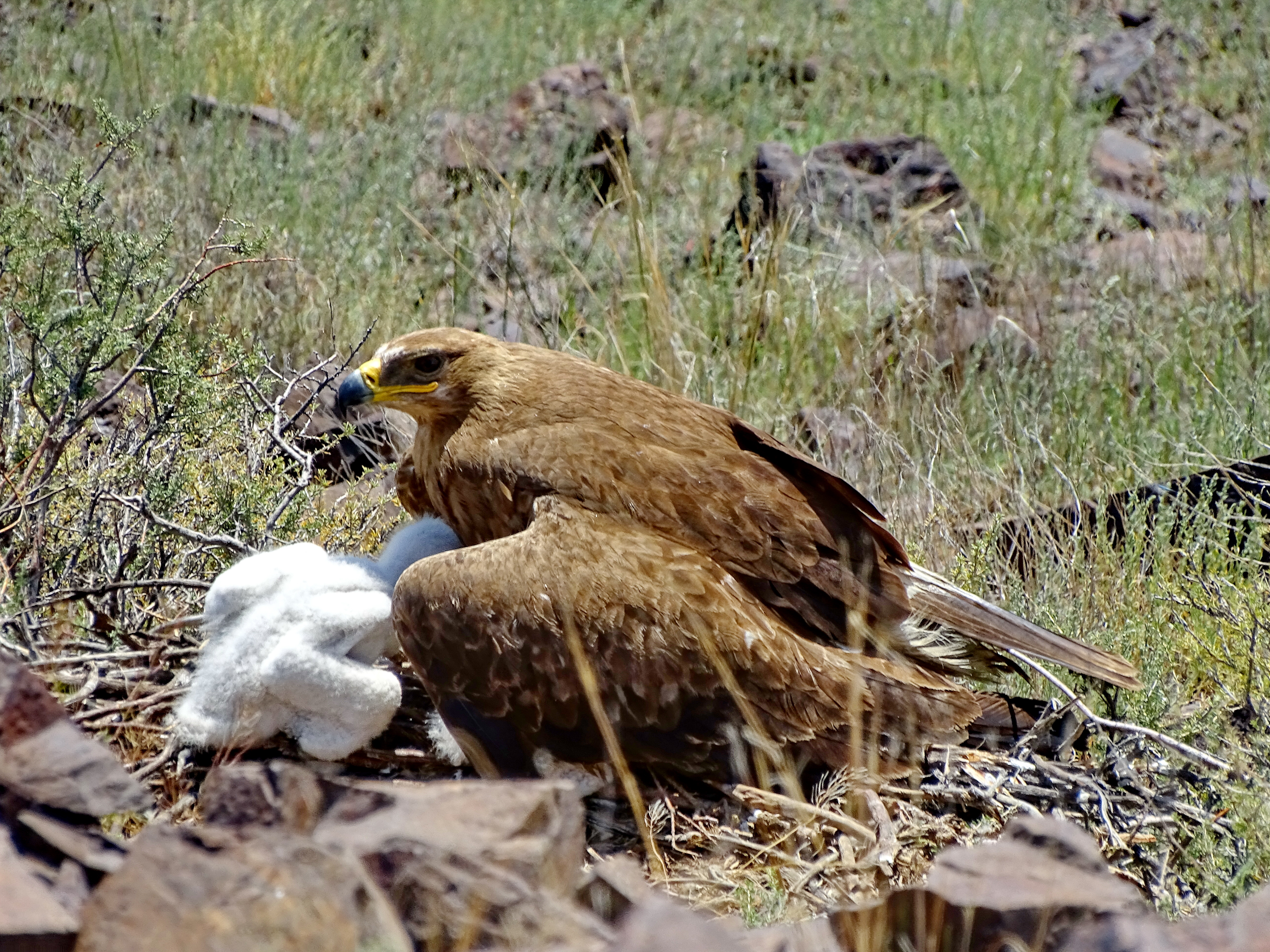
A steppe eagle mother with its eaglet; this eagle is still quite young and not in adult plumage. Subadult breeding is generally considered indicative of population stress in raptors.

The breeding range of the steppe eagle was already contracted markedly early on in the 20th century, especially in the west, largely as result of habitat loss (in particular appropriation of steppes for agriculture) but also persecution and predation, factors that may have driven some pairs to elevated nest sites. Steppe eagles once bred in Romania, Moldova and, more recently, Ukraine. Careless pesticide use in Europe depleted prey populations and collapsed nearly the whole local ecosystem, which alongside habitat conversions and persecution drove the steppe eagle's European breeding population to extinction. Range contraction is very considerable today in the European Russia area where it is almost locally extinct as well. Declines overall have been rapid and alarming. It is estimated that as of the 20 years prior to 2015, the population worldwide has declined at minimum by 58.6%. As a result, the steppe eagle was uplisted in 2015 to being endangered by the IUCN. In the borderlands of Russia and Kazakhstan, an estimated 11.9% population decline was detected in merely 6 years of study. Primary global threats appear to be habitat loss, persecution, wildfires, predation (and trampling by cattle) of chicks and electrocutions and wire collisions, especially the latter causes. Furthermore, the steppe eagles genetic diversity may be rapidly declining as well. The diagnosed causes of decline in Xinjiang, Tibet and Qinghai were found mostly to be poaching, poisoning from rodent control programs (with systemic efforts dating back at least 60 years), poisoning also targeted towards predators, illegal trade, food shortages and wire collisions but perhaps most of all habitat destruction, often with their former homes destroyed to make way for roadworks, tourism and mine exploration, with more destruction from overharvest of trees and plants and overgrazing by livestock, and accidental are frequent. Poisoning is thought to be quite prevalent in the Altais, as well as powerline electrocutions. A mean of 13.3 individual steppe eagles in Kazakhstan were estimated to be killed by each 10 km (6.2 mi) of powerline. The steppe eagle can even been the most frequently electrocuted raptor in Kazakh data, at up to about 35% of 129 dead raptors or 49% of 223 dead raptors in a couple of relatively small stretches. Many birds of various families are killed by these powerlines, as was recorded in Central Kazakhstan, in addition to the various raptorial birds which (due to their low reproductive rates and large territories) are often unable to withstand continuous powerline losses. It is estimated that in West Kazakhstan that no fewer than 1635 nests (or 7.9% of the entire breeding Kazakh population) fail due to the parents being electrocuted on powerlines. Across the border in Orenburg, Russia, a high rate of electrocutions is known be occurring as well. Furthermore, overgrazing and habitat alterations by humans have destroyed much of what remains around Haloxylon stands of west Kazakhstan (in turn destroying about 50% of local nesting attempts), while some steppe eagles cannot nest locally due to presumed competitive exclusion by imperial eagles. Locally predation and nest losses can claim up to 80% of chicks but productivity is heavily dependent on foods. In the Karaganda Region, 20.9% of nests were recorded to be ruined by steppe fires. Less well understood losses in West Kazakhstan may be due to continued poaching, poisonings and blackflies which kill nestlings and seem to have increased with the warming temperatures. The number of steppe fires appears to be higher than ever before which also may be due to increasing warmth and aridity. The probable and irrevocable extinction of this species is projected if numerous detrimental factors are not reversed, namely the mitigation of electrical lines and towers in breeding areas, the removal of grazing and manmade fires in breeding areas as well as habitat destruction and the several other threats. Ambiguities exist over whether Kazakhstan can institute protective laws strong enough to prevent the loss of the species, as even powerline alterations have not occurred at the national level. However, continued relative stability of the species has been detected in the more minor eastern part of the range (based on largely unchanged numbers of migrants from here in Nepal and elsewhere in the Himalayas) such as Altai. One potential stopgap solution to mitigate some of the electrocutions may be to install T-shaped perches around transmission towers which has been effective in reducing the more minor decline from powerlines in the Mongolian part of the range. Notably, the rate of decline in the western part of the range is so pronounced which is quite to the contrary other similar raptors like eastern imperial eagles and long-legged buzzards have begun to recover in similar areas (the opposite pattern almost manifests in the imperial eagle, which is declining much more severely in the east such as Baikal).

Thumamah, KSA 1993

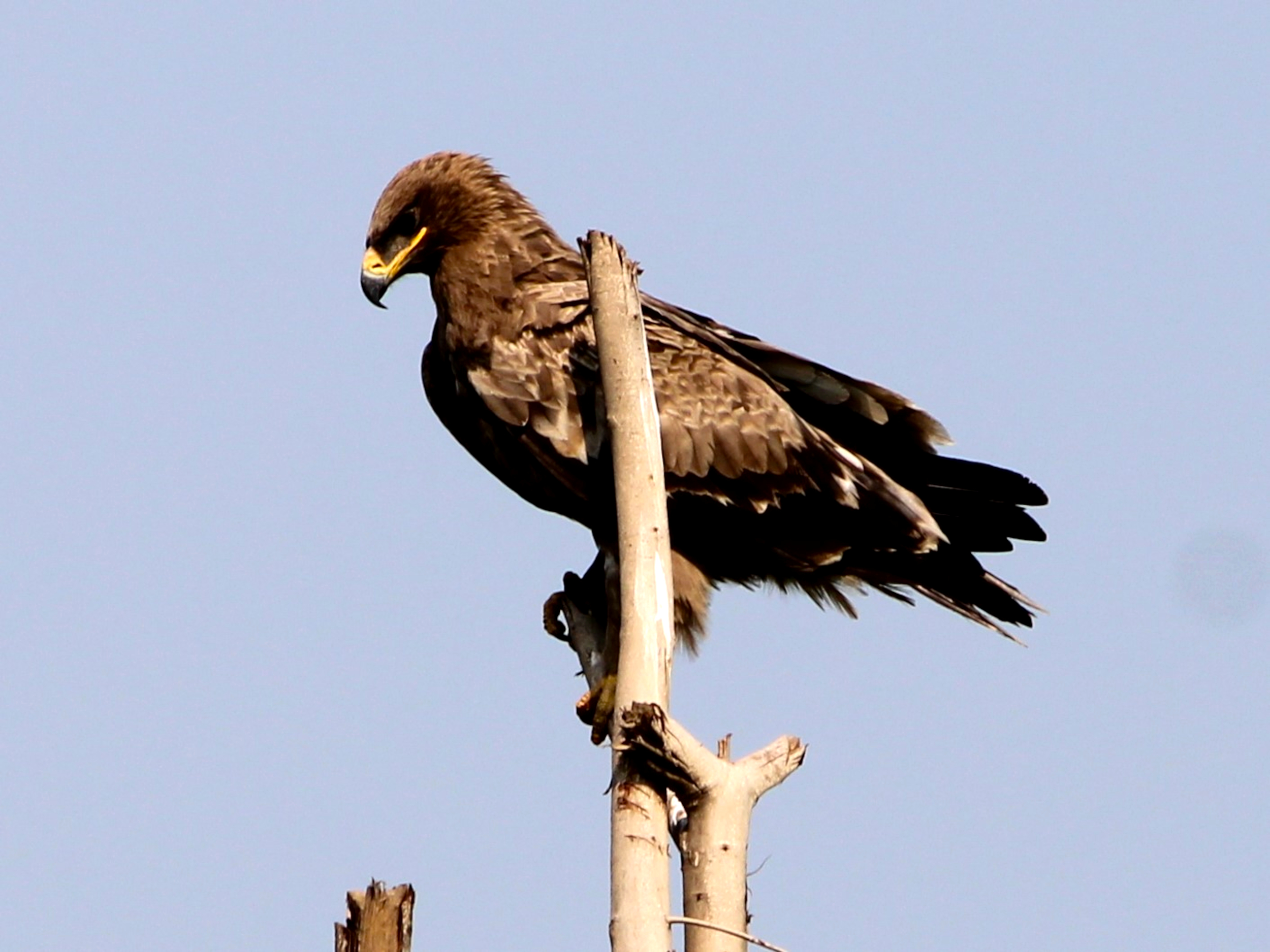
Steppe eagle near Chandigarh.

The nomadic nature of steppe eagles in winter can make accurate counts of the species in that season difficult. However, the species is still considered relatively frequent during winter in Pakistan. Declines from migrating and wintering areas appear to be generally poorly documented. There is concern that landfills function as ecological traps for these species, due to poisoning being frequent and powerlines frequently a present threat. From the years 1882 to 2013, an estimated 76,879 steppes were recorded in 9 countries in Indian subcontinent, including Afghanistan, Pakistan, Nepal, Tibet, Bhutan, Sikkim, Myanmar and Bangladesh, often gathering around garbage and carrion dumps. They may be even locally increasing somewhat in number in locales in India such as Kerala, possibly concentrated more so due to less competition from vultures. However, toxic levels of diclofenac were found in two dead steppe eagles at the cattle carcass dump in Rajasthan. A paper based on joint research conducted by the Bombay Natural History Society, Royal Society for the Protection of Birds and Indian Veterinary Research Institute, published in May 2014 in the journal of the Cambridge University Press, highlighted that steppe eagles are adversely affected by diclofenac and may fall prey to veterinary use of it. The research found the same signs of kidney failure as seen in the Gyps vulture killed due to diclofenac. They found extensive visceral gout, lesions and uric acid deposits in the liver, kidney and spleen, as well as deposits of diclofenac residue in tissues. Steppe eagles are opportunistic scavengers, which may expose them to the risk of diclofenac poisoning. Declines have pronounced in passage at Eilat, Israel, where the number of steppe eagle juveniles to adult has dropped 30% from the early 1980s and by 1.4% by 2000; all record low annual numbers in migration there have been subsequent to the 1990s. However, lower numbers in Eilat may be due in part to increasingly large portions of the steppe eagle population now wintering in Arabia rather than Africa. Persecution of raptors in Eilat appears to be still quite prevalent, with steppe eagles accounting for 9.1% of 77 raptors that were found killed by poachers (often appeared to have been wrapped in rope and sometimes mutilated), doing so apparently largely out of superstition. Some population declines of migrants in Israel may too have depleted as well by the Chernobyl disaster. Israeli biologist have strongly advocated that stricter protection be undertaken and a conserved greenbelt be instituted to accommodate the steppe eagle and other raptors in passage. The similar numbers seen in passage exiting Africa in spring as those entering in autumn indicate that mortality for the species is not high in that continent. Persecution through shooting likely continues to be of determent to steppe eagles migrating or wintering in the countries of Georgia, Armenia, Iraq and Jordan, with the eagles being relatively vulnerable due to their sluggish, unwary demeanor and, in Iraq, along with many raptors end up being offered at local markets. In Saudi Arabia, the turnover to more intensive farming activity has depleted to available habitat usable for steppe eagles. In Saudi Arabia as well as Iraq and Armenia, other conservation concerns are similar as elsewhere, including dangerous powerlines and potential poisonings.
