= List of whitewater rivers =

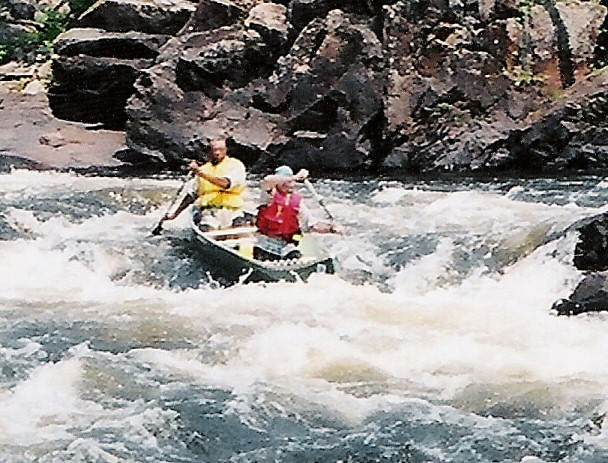
The Petawawa River is a popular whitewater river in Ontario, Canada.

A whitewater river is any river where its gradient and/or flow create rapids or whitewater turbulence. This list only focuses on rivers which are suitable for whitewater sports such as canoeing, kayaking, and rafting.

== Africa ==
- Zambezi, Zambia
- Nile, Uganda
- Tana River, Kenya

== Asia ==
=== Pakistan ===
- Sutlej
- Braldu
- Swat
- Kunhar River
- Indus River

=== Thailand ===
- Wa River is a popular whitewater rafting destination in the Nan Province of Thailand. It has rapids ranging from difficulty levels of 2 through 6.
- Wang Thong River is a popular whitewater rafting destination in the Phitsanulok Province of Thailand. It has rapids ranging from difficulty levels of 3 through 5.

=== India ===
In the north, most rivers in India descend from the Himalayas, the highest mountains on Earth: cold glacial waters thunder down the rocks, bringing with them ample whitewater rapids to encounter. The water here is high volume and can be very violent in the early spring. Hence, extreme caution must be taken if one has not mastered paddling skills for rapids above class III. Caution should otherwise be exercised near the Tibetan border as this is area is a place of extreme political dispute, on land and on water.

- Zanskar, a Grand Canyonesque experience. Class III-IV. Gradings, as on all rivers, subject to change depending on volume of water.
- Alaknanda
- Bhagirathi
- Brahmaputra River- This river begins in Tibet and winds its way towards Arunachal Pradesh, from whence it continues in a very steep gradient. Class V in high volume, but Class VI on some waterfalls that must be portaged. This area is a contested area between India and China and much paperwork is required to ride it.
- Mandakini
- Ganges: This river is thousands of miles long. It begins in the Himalayas and empties into the Bay of Bengal, shared with Bangladesh. Sadly, this river, very holy to Hindus, is very sick with pollution in its lower reaches, particularly near cities like Varanasi. This is a big water river that varies through the whole gamut depending on location, class II-V+ rapids.
- Tons
- Kali
- Yamuna
- Teesta
- Rangit

==== South India ====
Towards the south, all rivers originate from the Western Ghats. Most of them can only be paddled in the monsoon season (June–October), while some others can be paddled year-round as they are dependent on dam releases. Only a small percentage of the rivers have recorded descents, and there is a vast potential for first descents.

===== Rivers in Karnataka =====
- Kali River, section near Dandeli. Class III-III+
- Cauvery, multiple sections, Bheemeshwari, Dubare, Hogenakkal Class II-II+
- Upper Barapole, in Coorg. Class III-IV. Very creekish river.
- Sitanadi, near Agumbe. Class III
- Kempuhole, near Sakleshpur. Class II-V.
- Bhadra, Class II-III
- Shishila, near Dharmasthala, Class II+

=== Indonesia ===
- Alas River, located in South Aceh, Aceh, Sumatra.
- Asahan River, located in North Sumatra, Sumatra. Class IV-V.
- Batang Tarusan River, located in Taratak, West Sumatra, Sumatra. Class II-IV.
- Manau River, located in Jambi, Sumatra.
- Manna River, located in Tanjung Sakti, Lahat, South Sumatra, Sumatra. Grade IV.
- Selabung River, located in Banding Agung, South Ogan Komering Ulu, South Sumatra, Sumatra.
- Citarik River, located in Mount Halimun National Park, West Java, Java.
- Serayu River, located in Wonosobo, Dieng Highlands, Central Java, Java. Class II-IV.
- Ayung River, located in Bali.
- Nimanga River, located in Timbukar, Minahasa, North Sulawesi, Sulawesi.
- Sa’dan River, located in Tana Toraja, South Sulawesi, Sulawesi. Grade III-IV.

=== Malaysia ===
- Padas, located in Sabah, Borneo. Class III-IV (during rainy season - class V).
- Kiulu, located in Sabah, Borneo. Class I-II
- (Kampar River @ Itik, located in Gopeng Perak, Malaysia. Class I1-V)
- (Selangor River, located in Kuala Kubu bahru, Selangor. Class II-V)
- (Sungkai River, located in Sungkai, perak, Malaysia. Class I-V)
- (Ulu Slim River, located at Slim Village, Perak, Malaysia. Class I-V)
- (Bernam River, Located in Tanjung malim, Perak, Malaysia. Class I-III)
- (Loh River, located in Ulu Dungun, Terengganu, Malaysia. Class II-VI)
- (Singoh River, located in Grik, Perak, Malaysia. class II-VI)
- (Sedim River, located in Kulim Kedah, Malaysia. Class II-V)

=== Philippines ===
- Cagayan (de Oro) River, located in Cagayan de Oro City, Misamis Oriental, Philippines. Class II-III (upper section - class IV). Whitewater tributaries include:
  - Bubunaoan River, located in Cagayan de Oro City, Misamis Oriental and Bukidnon, Philippines. Class II-III
  - Tumalaong River, located in Lingating, Baungon, Bukidnon, Philippines. Class II-III
  - Kalawaig River, located in Talakag, Bukidnon, Philippines.
- Tagoloan River, located in Tagoloan, Misamis Oriental, Philippines. Class I-II (upper Tagoloan - Class II-IV)
- Malitbog River, located in Malitbog, Bukidnon, Philippines. Class II-III (creeking)
- Agusan River, located in Agusan, Cagayan de Oro city, Philippines. Class II-III (creeking)
- Jasaan (also known as Cabulig River) River, located in Jasaan, Misamis Oriental, Philippines. Class II in lower section, Class II-III in middle section.
- Cabulaway River, located at Balingasag, Misamis Oriental, Philippines. Class I-III (creeking)

== Europe ==
=== United Kingdom ===
Whitewater rivers in the UK are typically low volume and technical. In England and Wales rivers are typically less than 20 m^{3}/s, and some are run with less than 1 m^{3}/s (usually these involve skidding the kayak down steep rockslides and small waterfalls). In Scotland there are also a few bigger volume (up to about 50 m^{3}/s) rivers. Like many places in Europe, England, Scotland and Wales have been subject to centuries of rivers getting dammed, weired, or diverted in ways that suit agriculture or land development and the natural flow has been altered heavily in many regions; there are many orphan dams or sites intended for grist mills that no longer have any function but obstruct the water. Some areas of the island Great Britain occupies has enough gradient to create rapids and waterfalls, but unfortunately ages of damming prevents the full volume of water and snowmelt from reaching the lower reaches: Clywedog Dam holds back approximately 50,0000 megalitres of water alone on the River Severn, and Parliament granted weirs and locks to be placed upon that river multiple times during the 19th century, some of which are still used. Scotland is famous for its rocky north, but many rivers have been dammed in Scotland over the course of the 20th century to create hydroelectric power, with the trend still continuing.

Almost all runs in England and Wales need recent rain to be at a paddleable level, and many can only be run immediately after heavy rain. In Scotland, some bigger rivers can be run for weeks after rain although as with the rest of the country, most need recent wet weather. The paddling season is year-round but the rivers are more often runnable in winter (the wettest months of the year being December and January). Exceptions to this include rivers which have artificially maintained flows from reservoirs like the River Dee. On these rivers, flow may increase in dry weather as more water is released. The Afon Tryweryn is one example in Wales.

Most runs offer only a few kilometres of whitewater; often several rivers can be run on a wet day. Some rivers consist of only a single rapid. Only a few rivers (such as the Findhorn and Spean in the Scottish Highlands) have more than a days' worth of paddling, and most of this tends to be grade III or less.

The River Dart excepted, there is no natural whitewater in the (mainly flat) south and east of England. Here whitewater paddlers often go playboating at man made weirs. Hurley weir on the River Thames west of London is probably the most popular. There are several artificial whitewater courses, where water is pumped or diverted through a concrete channel containing obstacles to create rapids. There is a 28 m^{3}/s artificial whitewater course on the Trent at Holme Pierrepont in Nottingham (at the National Watersports Centre), a 5 m^{3}/s course on the Tees in Teesside, and smaller courses on the Nene at Northampton, and at Cardington.

In England Commercial rafting is limited to artificial whitewater courses (where it often provides the majority of the courses' income). Bigger and more reliable rivers can be found in Scotland and Wales, like the River Findhorn, River Orchy, River Spey and River Tay in Scotland, and the Afon Tryweryn and River Dee in Wales.

There are several sites off the west coast of Britain where strong tidal currents channeled between islands create big volume sections of whitewater. These include the Bitches in Pembrokeshire in Wales, and the Falls of Lora on the west coast of Scotland.

Legal access to whitewater is a big issue in England and Wales. The law is currently unclear, resulting in two schools of thought followed.

- The first, followed by many anglers and the Anglers Association, states that rivers are almost all private and require access agreements to be set up with the riparian owners. This means that the public are only allowed access to a tiny proportion of the available whitewater, and often this is restricted to a few months or even a few days per year. This also limits commercial operations and the activities of clubs. Agreements rarely exist as there is no incentive for the owners of rivers to let anyone else use them.
- Recently, legal research conducted by Rev Dr Douglas Caffyn, claims to have identified a public right of access on all navigable rivers in England and Wales in Common Law. In law, a public right is a higher right than any private right, and so this outweighs the rights of the riparian owners in a court of law.

In Scotland, like most of the rest of the world, access to whitewater is legal and has never been illegal. It has been enshrined in law in the recent Scottish Land Reform act. The Right to Roam act in England explicitly excluded rivers. The British Canoe Union is running the Rivers Access Campaign to raise awareness and bring about changes in the law to permit public access to all inland rivers in England and Wales.

=== Alps ===
Whitewater rivers in the Alps are mainly medium volume glacier-fed rivers with long continuous rapids and few big drops. The season is short (two or three months in early summer when the snow and glaciers are melting) but the whitewater is reliable in this period. Tourists come from around Europe to kayak and raft–the most common centres are Briançon in the French Alps, the area around Landeck in Austria, and Bovec in Slovenia.

==== Austria ====
- Enns River, Schladming, Class 3–4
- Inn River Imst Gorge, Haiming, Class 3
- Inn River Landeck Gorge, Landeck, Class 4–5
- Saalach River, Lofer, Class 3–4
- Salzach River, Zell am See, Class 3–4
- Sanna River, Landeck, Class 4

==== France ====
- Dranse River, Morzine, Class 3–4
- Doron de Bozel River, Bourg St Maurice, Class 4–5
- Durance River, Embrun, Class 3
- Guisane River, Briancon, Class 3–4
- Isere River, Bourg St Maurice, Class 4
- Ubaye River, Barcelonnette, Class 4–5

==== Italy ====
- Dora Baltea River, Villeneuve, Class 3–4
- Noce River, Dimaro, Class 4–5
- Sesia River, Varallo Sesia, Class 2–4

==== Slovenia ====
- Soca River, Bovec, Class 3–4

=== France (Corsica) ===
- Golo River, Ponte Leccia, Class 3–4

=== Greece ===
The best time to go rafting and kayaking in Greece is in Spring when the river flow and weather are ideal.

- Arachthos River, Arta, Class 2–4
- Kalaritikos River, Arta, Class 4
- Mileopotamos River, Grevena, Class 3–4
- Venetikos River, Grevena, Class 2–4
- Pinios River - Vernezi Route, Larissa, Class 3–4
- Aspropotamos River, Trikala, Class 3

=== Italy (Apennines) ===
Spring is the best time for rafting and kayaking in Southern Italy as the currents are stronger.

- Lao River, Laino Borgo, Class 3–4

=== Montenegro ===
Rivers in Montenegro all come from high mountains close to the sea. They have natural riverbeds with very different sections from steep creeking to large volume. They have best water in spring, but some are runnable throughout the year.

Tara river, Kolašin, Mojkovac, Žabljak, Pljevlja, Plužine 130 km, Durmitor National Park Class 2–5

Moraca river, Kolašin, Podgorica, Class 2–5

Lim river, Plav, Andrijevica, Berane, Bijelo polje, Class 2–4

Cijevna, Podgorica, Class 3

=== Norway ===
Similar to its Swedish neighbour, Norwegian whitewater rivers are typically steep pool-drop rivers with many waterfalls, and are run mainly by experienced kayakers. There are also bigger (sometimes glacier-fed) rivers which are sometimes rafted. The season lasts all summer, although some rivers only run after recent rain. Norwegian waterfalls regularly feature on extreme kayaking videos.

=== Portugal ===
The best time for whitewater in Portugal is in Spring during the higher river flow.

- Paiva River - Praia do Vau to Espiunca, Arouca, Class 3–4
- Laboreiro River I - (Castro Laboreiro) Ameijoeira Bridge to Ribeiro de Baixo, class IV-V (X);
- Laboreiro River II - (Castro Laboreiro) Ribeiro de Baixo to Olelas, Class IV-V (X);
- Vez River I - Porta Cova (Sistelo) to Sistelo Bridge, Classe IV (V);

=== Russia ===
White water sport in Russia is quite popular, but the vast majority of people uses catamarans for these purposes. The best period for whitewater is May and July–August. Some rivers are possible to raft in June and September.

Here is a list of the most popular rivers:

==== Altai ====
- Peschanaya river - Class III
- Katun river - Class IV. One of the most volumed river in the region.
- Kumir, Korgon, Charysh rivers - Class IV. Normally, the trips include rafting down all three rivers.
- Chuya river - Class V (VI for Mazhoiskiy kaskad). The right tributary of Katun river. There are regular competitions down Chuya on the Mazhoyskiy kaskad part - the canyon part of the river, which includes around 30 rapids, 10 of them are VI class.
- Bolshaya Sumulta, Malaya Sumulta rivers - Class V. Malaya Sumulta flows into Bolshaya Sumulta which is the tributary of Katun.
- Shavla river - Class V. Tributary of Argut.
- Chulyshman river - Class V (VI). The middle and down part contain three rapids V class and two VI class. The upper part contains seven VI class rapids. There is an opportunity of rafting down upper Bashkaus and middle-down Chulyshman (Class V).
- Bashkaus river - Class V (VI). The upper part has a number of IV class rapids and one V class. The down part is one of the most difficult places for white water containing 11 rapids VI class. The river flows in 35 km canyon without any opportunity of evacuation by land.
- Argut river - Class VI
- Kadrin river - Class VI

==== Baikalia ====
- Zun-Murin river - Class III
- Utulik river - Class IV (V)
- Khara-Murin river - Class IV (V)
- Snezhnaya river - Class IV (V)

==== Caucasus ====
- Bolshoy Zelenchuk river - Class II (IV)
- Kuban river - Class II (IV)
- Bolshaya Laba river - Class II (V)
- Belaya river - Class II (VI)
- Mzymta river - Class II (V)
- Psheha river - Class III

==== Karelia ====
- Tohmajoki river - Class II (IV)
- Uksunjoki river - Class II (V)

==== Kola Peninsula ====
- Krasnenkaya river - Class III (IV)
- Kutsayoki river - Class III (IV)
- Tuntsayoki river - Class III
- Tumcha river - Class III

==== Novgorod Oblast ====
- Msta river - Class I (II)

==== Putorana Plateau ====
- Bolshoy Honnamakit river - Class III (IV)
- Ayan river - Class III
- Kureyka river - Class IV
- Oran river - Class VI

==== Sayan ====
- Bolshoy Yenisei (Biy-Hem) river - Class IV
- Ulug-O river - Class IV
- Ona, Abakan rivers - Class IV
- Oka river - Class IV
- Zhombolok river - Class IV (V). Tributary of Oka.
- Chuna (Uda) river - Class IV (VI)
- Kitoy river - Class V (VI)
- Onot river - Class VI

==== Transbaikalia ====
- Vitim river - Class III
- Tsipa river - Class III (IV)

==== Ural ====
- Inzer (Bolshoi Inzer) river - Class II (III)
- Lemeza river - Class II (III)
- Kara river - Class IV. The river flows in Polar Ural. Usually, the trips also include Sibirchata-Yaha river.

=== Serbia ===
- Ibar river is one of the most famous whitewater courses in this area. Section between Usce and Maglic is class III. Upper Ibar is in class III-IV.

Studenica river (left tributary of Ibar) is very attractive for whitewater kayaking (III-V)

- Lim river in canyon between Kumanica and Prijepolje, class III-IV. Lim is also very attractive near town Priboj.
- Veliki Rzav river class II-II+. It is one of the cleanest rivers in Serbia.

=== Bosnia and Herzegovina ===
- Neretva river class 3
- Una river class 3–4
- Vrbas river class 3+
- Krivaja (Bosna) class 3–4
- Sutjeska river class 3–4

=== Bulgaria ===
- Struma river class 3–4
- Arda river class 2–3

=== Romania ===
- Cerna river class 2–4
- Jiu river class 2-3 (lower section), class 3-3+ (upper section - Jiu canion)
- Buzau river class 2–3
- Nera river class 2+
- Basca Roziliei river class 3-3+
- Basca Mare river class 3–4

=== Croatia ===
- Mreznica river class 2–3

=== Spain ===
Like the Alps, whitewater in the Pyrenees is best in early summer when the snow and glaciers are melting.

- Ara River - Torla, Class 3–5
- Gallego River - Murillo de Gallego, Class 3–4
- Esera River - Campo (Huesca), Class 3–4
- Noguera Pallaresa River - Llavorsi to Rialp, Sort, Class 3–4

=== Sweden ===
The Swedish whitewater rivers are mainly big water and is located in the middle and north parts of Sweden. One of the most spectacular rivers is Vindelaelven and particularly Trollforsarna III-VI, where one Euro cup competition was held in 2007.

The main information channel for Swedish white water is Forsguiden,

== North America ==
=== Canada ===
Canada has a varied terrain that supports many kinds of environments, with the majority of whitewater found in three areas: the mountainous Rockies in Alberta, the smaller Eastern forests of Quebec, Ontario, and some of the Maritimes, and the volcanic influenced geology of British Columbia. This creates the conditions necessary for whitewater: gradient, volume, and pressure. Like its neighbor to the south, First Nations had used the river systems as personal highways and built dugout canoes to run rapids; later French Canadian fur trappers used the same technique to collect beaver pelts and form small settlements.

Canadian whitewater rivers are characterized by the dramatic difference between the high water spring run-off and the summer low water volume; the classification of rapids therefore changes from spring to summer. It also is highly subject to the change of seasons, where many places are frozen solid by October and, for example, runs that are ready in late May in the neighboring US Pacific Northwest are still too dangerous to attempt in British Columbia or too cold: the spring run-off of the glaciers has either not finished or the landscape is not fully thawed.

Most of the land in Canada is not privately owned and likewise neither are the rivers. Many places in which water thunders through the terrain are on land that is either protected or very remote, so knowledge of first aid and the local wildlife is paramount. As with the United States to the South, rattlesnakes, grizzly bears, black bears, mountain lions, wolves, and two members of the lynx family are very much active at the height of rafting and kayaking season, and they do use the water as a source of food and sustenance. On multi day excursions in The Northwest Territories, British Columbia, or Alberta it is extremely important to know or learn to coexist with the grizzly bears that live there; this is particularly true when it is salmon season. Caution should be used whenever camping in bear country, and learning how to properly store food or anything with a scent is paramount to avoiding conflict.

==== Alberta ====
- Bow River - Horseshoe Canyon, II - III
- Carbondale Creek, Southern Alberta
- Cascade Creek, Western Rockies, III - IV
- Castle River, Southern Albert
- Elbow River, Western Rockies, III+ - IV
- Highwood River, and tributaries, Southern Alberta
- Kakwa River, Northern Alberta
- Kananaskis River, Foothills, II - III
- Mosquito Creek - Western Rockies, II - III
- Mystia River, Western Rockies, II - III+
- North Saskatchewan River, Rockies to Plains, II - III
- Oldman River, Southern Alberta
- Pipestone River, Western Rockies, III - IV
- Red Earth Creek, Western Rockies, IV - V
- St. Mary River (Montana-Alberta), II - III
- Sheep River, Western Rockies, III+ - V
- Slave River, NWT Border, I-VI
- Smoky River, Northern Alberta
- Upper Bow - Western Rockies, Willys Rapid Section, III - IV
- Upper Red Deer River, Alberta foothills, II - III
- Waterton River, Southern Alberta

==== British Columbia ====
- Fraser River, British Columbia
- Alsek, British Columbia - Alaska
- Ashnola River, Keremeos, IV - IV+
- Babine River
- Capilano River
- Chehalis River
- Chilliwack River
- Coquitlam River
- Mamquam River
- Cheakamus River
- Dipper Creek, Squamish Valley, V+
- Kicking Horse River, III - IV
- Yoho River, Columbia Valley, IV - V
- Toby Creek, Columbia Valley, IV - V+
- Skookumchuck Creek, Columbia Valley, IV
- Upper Fraiser, Columbia Valley, III - IV
- Palliser River, Kootney Valley, III
- Albertson River, Kootney Valley, III - V
- Kootney River, Kootney Valley
- Thompson River, Central, III - IV-
- Stein River, Central, IV - V
- Nahatlatch River, Central, III - V
- Clear Water River, Central, III - IV
- Tatlow Creek, Coastal
- Ryan Creek, Coastal
- Soo River, Coastal, IV - V
- Callahan Creek, Coastal, V
- Kanu River, Coastal
- Homathko River, Coastal
- Dean River, Coastal
- Stikine River, Coastal, V - VI
- Englishman River, Island, III - IV
- Similkameen River, Princeton, II - III

==== Nunavut ====
- Kazan River

==== Ontario ====
- Niagara River The Canadian side of the river has the largest of the three set of waterfalls that make up Niagara Falls, all rated Class VI. Niagara Gorge squeezes a large volume that rivals the Congo River in size of the water in spite of being smaller in area. Many people have died from not respecting the water here, which is why one is very likely to get arrested for even attempting it.
- Albany River
- Attawapiskat river
- Gull River- Class III
- Ottawa River (at the Ottawa River Provincial Park near Whitewater Region, Ontario) III - IV
- Otoskwin River
- Kesagami River
- Madawaska River-Class III
- Magnetawan River
- Magpie River
- Missinaibi River
- Moose River
- Opeongo River
- Petawawa River-Class III - IV
- Spanish River
- Wellandvale/Twelve Mile Creek, in planning stage
- Mattawa river
- Winisk River

==== Quebec ====
- Ashuapmushuan River
- Coulonge River
- Bonaventure River
- Dumoine River
- Du Chef River
- Gens de Terre River
- George River (Quebec)
- Harricana river
- Kipawa River
- Saint Lawrence River (Lachine Rapids), Montreal
- Moisie River
- Mistassini River
- Noire River
- Rouge River
- Rupert River
- Neilson River-Class IV - V
- Du Nord River, III - VI
- Doncaster River, III - IV
- Jacques-Cartier River (Taureau), IV - V, Québec City
- Jacques-Cartier River (Tewkesbury), III - IV, Québec City
- Saint-Charles River, III, Québec City
- Broadback River, I - VI
- Gatineau River, III - IV
- Mistassibi River, IV - V, Lac saint-jean

==== Manitoba ====
- Bloodvein River
- Berens-Pigeon River
- Manigotagan River
- Roseau River
- Seal River
- Whitemouth River

==== Northwest Territories ====
The whitewater rivers in the Northwest Territories are remote and require access and egress by float plane or helicopter. Most are over or close to 300 km in length from the put in to the take out, and therefore are multi-day expeditions.

- North Nahanni River, Northwest Territories - IV-VI
- South Nahanni River, Northwest Territories - II, Upper III+
- Broken Skull River, Northwest Territories - II+
- Keele River, Northwest Territories - II+
- Natla River, Northwest Territories - II+ -III+
- Mountain River, Northwest Territories - II-III
- Ravensthroat River, Northwest Territories - II-III+
- Redstone River, Northwest Territories - II-III+
- Silverberry River, Northwest Territories - II-III+
- Horton River, Northwest Territories - I-III+
- Arctic Red River, Northwest Territories - I-III+
- Kazan River
- Slave River, Alberta Border, Fort Smith - I-V

=== United States ===
The United States offers varied terrain and conditions through which rivers pass, everything from the deserts of the southwest to glacial peaks in Alaska to Appalachian creeks that thunder through the glades to even a few that run right through the downtown sections of small cities and isolated hamlets.

Legally, most rivers and creeks are not privately held. They are the property of the nation and its people and are overseen by individual state governments and a handful of federal government agencies in Washington, DC like the Department of the Interior, National Park Service, National Forest Service, and Bureau of Land Management. Dams may be held on a contract basis with the federal or state government, for example the energy company PG&E has dams in the Sierra Nevada range near Sacramento in California and this affects water volume. (Other entities like the Tennessee Valley Authority in the East have similar arrangements, and the water volume is lower than it should be naturally in the East in many sections of the Appalachians.) The Army Corps of Engineers and the operators of the dams themselves usually schedule releases in advance and this information is readily available to the public upon request.

Many whitewater rivers and creeks exist in rather rural or wild conditions when compared to parts of Europe and thus are located in places where animals can bite back or harm visitors, including children and dogs. (Some require a substantial hike through forest, desert, or mountains to reach the put in and cannot be reached by car at all.) In no particular order or regard to specific geography, they would include grizzly bears, black bears, moose, bull elk, porcupines, cougars, bobcats, more than 15 species of rattlesnakes on both sides of the Mississippi, scorpions, copperheads, water mocassins, and coral snakes. Beavers are sometimes extant on rivers but prefer to build in the calmer sections where there are only minor riffles and their dams are easily portaged or surmounted.

==== Eastern United States ====
There are several places in the East where the water roars, everything from big rivers like the Delaware River to creeks that dive over large waterfalls, many exceeding 30 feet (9.1 m). In fact, there used to be more of them but over time some of these have been dammed or altered; the upper portions of the Mississippi River near St. Paul Minnesota, for example, used to have very large rapids and several waterfalls. The Mississippi, the divide between East and West itself, used to be a much more wild and turbulent river with more violent spots in its drainage area past Cairo Illinois with the Des Moines Rapids and the Sauk Rapids being either larger than today or undammed.

===== New England =====
The following are some of the rivers in New England that are popular.

- Ashuelot River, New Hampshire, Class III-IV
- Bearcamp River, New Hampshire, Class II-IV
- Contoocook River, New Hampshire, Class III-IV
- Dead River, Maine, Class III-V
- Deerfield River, Vermont and Massachusetts, Class II-V. Navigable from spring until just before Halloween, when the water begins to freeze. First rafting companies set up here in the 1980s.
- Farmington River, Massachusetts and Connecticut, Class III
- Gale River, New Hampshire, Class I-IV
- Housatonic River, Connecticut, Class I-V. Closest whitewater to New York City.
- Kennebec River, Maine, mostly Class II-IV
- Millers River, Massachusetts, Class III
- Penobscot River, Maine, Class III-V
- Quaboag River, Massachusetts, Class III
- Rapid River, Maine, Class IV
- Saco River, New Hampshire, Class III-IV
- Swift River, New Hampshire, Class II-IV
- West River, Vermont, class II-III
- Westfield River, Massachusetts, Class I-IV
- Winhall River, Vermont, Class III

===== New York =====
- Black River, Watertown - Class III-V
- Delaware River - Class I-II. Further down the river also has a few rapids as well that can swell to III in wet weather.
- Esopus Creek - Class II-IV
- Genesee River - Class II-III
- Grasse River - Upper section, Class IV - V
- Hudson River, North Creek - Foreign visitors should be advised and warned that the name should not fool them: it is true that the Hudson empties in the tidal estuary where New York City sits. However, this section is over 200 miles away from New York City in heavily forested wilderness; this water is placid only in sections farther south and requires hiking to reach the put in in some cases; not to be attempted in the mistaken and dangerous belief the water is anything like it is near Manhattan. Class IV-V. Suitable for kayakers intermediate and above.
- Middle Branch Oswegatchie River - Bryants Bridge and Sluice Falls sections, Class IV -V.
- Mongaup River - Class II-III; about 3-mile (4.8 km)
- Moose River, Old Forge - Class IV-V+
- Niagara River (Whirlpool Rapids) - Class V+
- Raquette River - Class III - IV+
- Sacandaga River, Lake Luzerne- Class II-III
- Salmon River - Class I-III
- Ten Mile Creek - Class I-III; about 10 miles (16 km)

===== Mid-Atlantic =====
- Lackawanna River, Pennsylvania, Class I-IV: a 26-mile (42 km) run
- Lehigh River, White Haven to Jim Thorpe, Pennsylvania - a 24-mile (39 km) run, through a gorge, Class III; in high water this is a Class 4 run. A very good choice for those learning to paddle when the water is at its normal dam release level.
- Nescopeck Creek, Pennsylvania, Class II-III
- Patapsco River, Maryland, Class I-IV. A 31.5 mile (50.69 km) run
- Patuxent River, Maryland, Class I-IV.
- Potomac River, West Virginia/Maryland/Virginia, Class II-V+. This river begins in the Appalachian Mountains and runs to the sea, a distance of 367 miles (approx 591 km.) This river forms the border between Northern Virginia and the District of Columbia. There are two major whitewater sections. The first is close to Harpers Ferry, West Virginia, class III. The second section is V to V+ and includes the Great Falls of the Potomac, just 12 miles (19 km) from the center of Washington, D.C. Additionally, there are at least five major "forks" of the Potomac, with some reaching class III - IV (without waterfalls), mostly in West Virginia.
- Rockaway River, Boonton, New Jersey, Class IV
- Stonycreek River, Pennsylvania, Class III-IV
- Slippery Rock Creek, Pennsylvania, Class II-III
- Tohickon Creek, Pennsylvania, Class III
- Youghiogheny River, Pennsylvania/Maryland; Upper Yough (Sang Run to Friendsville, MD), Class 4–5; Lower Yough (Ohiopyle to Bruner's Run, PA), Class II-IV.

===== Southeast =====
The Southeast is the section of the nation where the Appalachian Mountains have their highest peaks. In most cases the size of the water is smaller than the West, however, some of the finest whitewater in the East is here, especially good for kayakers.

- Chattahoochee River, Columbus, Georgia- Urban whitewater, class I-V rapids. Short course of very turbulent rapids with unusually high water volume for a Southern river.
- Chattooga River, Georgia / South Carolina - sports long, challenging rapids, big drops, and thunderous power; this river can be a challenge for even experts; the Chattooga was one of the rivers used for the filming of the 1973 adventure movie, Deliverance. It is designated as a Wild and Scenic River.
- Cheat River, West Virginia - Class IV.
- French Broad River, Asheville, North Carolina - featuring a long run of varying difficulty, from flatwater runnable in a canoe to class IV rapids near Hot Springs, North Carolina and the border with Tennessee. The main drawbacks are that the water tends to be muddy or polluted and it is a natural flow river.
- Gauley River, Summersville, West Virginia - Nicknamed "The Beast of the East." Has huge rapids, especially at the "Fall Drawdown" (when the reservoir is drained) is a world-class ride; many of them listed as Class V; the Upper Gauley, from Summersville to Mason's Branch, is the tougher section; the Lower Gauley, from Koontz' Flume to Swiss, is still a Class-IV river with significant hazards; navigating the Upper and Lower Gauley in a single day is called "the Gauley Marathon," twenty-six miles of big rapids and paddling.
- Green River, Asheville, North Carolina - the Green Narrows is the steepest "creek run" with regular activity in the Eastern U.S; with a gradient that reaches 600 feet/mile over one short section, The Narrows is a series of blind waterfalls and tight slots; regular, predictable releases from the Tuxedo Hydro Plant upstream draw paddlers on a regular basis.
- James River, Richmond, Virginia - Urban whitewater; Class IV. Runs right through downtown Richmond, VA, the state capital. Good for beginners in upper part and a decent river for practice for the more advanced. This river was named for James VI and I and was one of the first to ever be navigated by British settlers; much farther downriver the water becomes quieter and brackish and leads straight to the spot where the fort of Jamestown was built and the archaeological site still stands. Not far from Richmond, the Powhatan Confederacy built their capital, Werowocomoco, on an island in this river and chose it in part because of its considerable rapids.
- Linville Gorge, western North Carolina - This runs right through Pisgah National Forest and has Class V rapids; it is a creek run suitable for kayakers and small canoes but it is too small for rafts. Approximately 17 miles long and not recommended at all for novices as it is one of the most difficult runs in the east. Very steep gorge walls make escape in an accident impossible. Deaths have occurred for those who overestimate their skills.
- Nantahala River, Bryson City, North Carolina - a relatively gentle river, with the final rapid having the propensity to send paddlers in for a cold, exhilarating swim; suitable for beginners and families with younger children.
- New River, Thurmond, West Virginia - Class III-V natural flow river. Passes through portions of Monongahela National Forest.
- Ocoee River, Ducktown, Tennessee – Site of 1996 Olympic Slalom Course at the Ocoee Whitewater Center and already a river with natural whitewater. A very good river for both novices and more advanced paddlers. Gets its name from passiflora incarnata, the maypop, a very close relative of the commercial passionfruit that is a common edible garden plant in the South and was introduced as a source of food to settlers by tribes like the Cherokee. This plant is still found in thickets near the river.
- Pigeon River (Tennessee – North Carolina), Tennessee - class III+ rapids, Dam released river with scheduled releases from Memorial Day to Labor Day. This river runs right through Cherokee National Forest and is not far from Great Smoky Mountains National Park.
- Russell Fork, this class V river drops 150 feet (46 m) per mile in the Russell Fork Gorge, which has been described as a continuous 45-degree waterfall; it has dangerous rapids, even experienced paddlers have died in its many undercut rocks, and there have been many close calls; for the most experienced rafters and kayakers only.
- Watauga River, mostly cold and clear water Class I-II rapids with the exception of the Bee Cliff Rapids following scheduled high volume reservoir releases during summer months from the Tennessee Valley Authority Wilbur Dam flowing through Elizabethton, Tennessee (Northeast Tennessee); also upstream of both TVA Wilbur Dam and Watauga Dam as a separate, non-commercial run beginning in North Carolina to Johnson County, Tennessee above Watauga Lake; Class IV-V.

==== Western United States ====
In the western United States, the more noted rivers, such as the Grand Canyon have much greater water volume and therefore require a different set of paddling skills. Western rafters also navigate many small, low volume rivers, some with much steeper descents than eastern rivers; however, since the mountains are newer in the west, the hazard from undercut rocks, a problem in the east, is replaced by more frequent log jams precipitated by logging activities near the rivers.

The big-water rivers usually do not require the precision paddling of smaller rivers, but have larger rapids and longer wilderness trips due to the greater length and water flow of the big rivers. The smaller rivers and creeks boated by most rafters offer many one- or two-day trips with difficulty levels from I to VI.

In the West, some paddlers start on the American in California and work their way up to the Rogue and Illinois in Oregon, the Tuolumne (California), the Salmon in Idaho, the Snake, and then the big-water rivers like the Green and Colorado through the Grand Canyon (Arizona), the Fraser in British Columbia, and many Alaskan streams.

===== California =====
California has some of the most challenging whitewater runs in the United States as well as several rivers with sections that are safe for families with children who wish to go rafting. Several rivers in California are fed by the snowmelt of the Sierra Nevada mountain range as well as natural springs in high mountainous areas; some rivers flow directly through protected land and foreign visitors should be strongly warned that early spring runs can be very dangerous; the normal classification cranks up much higher turning some runs into death traps for even Olympic level whitewater enthusiasts. A primary example would be Cherry Creek, a class V-V+ river in normal conditions: this creek has had a number of fatalities to its name for unwary kayakers because the water cuts through high vertical walls of granite: there is no way out except down the river and certain sections cannot be portaged. If the water volume gets too high, death is certain. It is for this reason most locals will not willingly even try to ride it before June.

- American River
- Carson River
- Cosumnes River
- Eel River
- Feather River
- Kaweah River
- Kern River
- Kings River- Cuts through a very deep canyon. Overall class I-V rapids, depending on section as this river is quite large with many tributaries. Portions of the river are part of Kings Canyon National Park and also flow through Sierra National Forest which abuts the national park directly; the most challenging whitewater is normally not accessible except by hiking or horseback. Portions of the river and its tributaries were used for the 1972 Slalom Olympic Trials. Was designated a National Wild and Scenic River in 1987.
  - North Fork Kings River, class V.
  - South Fork Kings River, including Garlic Falls, Class V.
  - Middle Fork Kings River III-V+
  - Dinkey Creek-Class V.
- Merced River
- Klamath River
- Mokelumne River
- Napa River
- Russian River
- Sacramento River-This river is one of the most important rivers of Northern California. It begins in the Klamath Mountains and cuts right through downtown Sacramento, the state capital of California. It then turns west where it empties out near Oakland, a distance of over 400 miles. Although it has several sections that are heavily dammed for agriculture nearer the San Joaquin River Delta, others like the Upper Sacramento near Mount Shasta range class II-IV.
- Smith River
- Stanislaus River
- Trinity River
- Truckee River
- Tuolumne River This river partially enters Yosemite National Park and once played a role in the now-gone Hetch Hetchy Valley. Its classification is I-V+. One section was not considered navigable until as late as 1983, and requires multiple portages of waterfalls that are too dangerous for kayakers in particular. This river requires overall that a rafter or kayaker knows how to swim, and many sections are in areas that are remote.
  - Cherry Creek Class V-VI. For advanced kayakers and canoes only.
  - Clavey River, Class V+. Clavey can only be accessed by hiking to the put in, and it is a wild 20.8 mile ride.

===== Colorado, Utah, Arizona, and New Mexico =====
- Animas River
- Arkansas River - a big river, with many sections ranging from Class I to V, popular with kayakers and with commercial rafting companies. Numerous runs of all difficulty. Probably the most frequently run and one of the best rivers in Colorado.
- Boulder Creek
- Cache La Poudre River - Colorado's only federally designated Wild and Scenic River contains sections appropriate for every level of expertise including an easy Class II section, several Class III and Class-IV sections, as well as some Class V. There is a Class VI waterfall that is very dangerous because the last drop is unrunnable. The water pours off a slab into a 2-foot (0.61 m)-wide crack and grinds anything that goes into it.
- Clear Creek (Colorado)
- Colorado River-This river is the most famous whitewater river in the country, with sections in Arizona, Utah, Nevada (near Hoover Dam), and Colorado; it is also one of the longest rivers in the Western deserts and its overall classification ranges from I-V+. Gore Canyon is the first difficult section and should not be attempted by novices, Class IV-V, depending on the time of year and rainfall and this part is the upper section in Colorado. The section through the Grand Canyon and Grand Canyon National Park would include the Hance Rapids and overall the class of the rapids here are I-V, with the overall section being a IV. Utah's Cataract Canyon is third, with up to 1,400 m^{3}/s volume running through the canyon as this section goes through Canyonlands National Park. Class III to V. Glen Canyon Dam is reliant on the releases from the dam that come seasonally, however this part can get up to V+. Trips down this river can take many days to complete, and full navigation, months.
- Dolores River
- Green River
- Gunnison River: Grand Canyon National Park has a much lesser known sister to the northeast in Colorado: Black Canyon of the Gunnison National Park, created in 1999 and thus as of 2021one of the youngest of all national parks. The Gunnison River drops about 34 feet per mile (10.4 m/1.6 km) in the canyon and thus has a steeper gradient than the portions of the Colorado that are normally rafted or kayaked. Rapids vary to class I to VI overall on the whole river and in the canyon itself the rapids get to V and up. Visitors must be highly skilled to raft the whole of the Black Canyon section.
  - Kannah Creek Class V
- Los Pinos River
- North Platte River
- Rio Grande del Norte through the Rio Grande Gorge
- Roaring Fork River
- South Platte River
- Yampa River

===== Idaho =====
- Kootenai River
- Lochsa River
- Middle Fork Salmon River - Class III-IV
- North Fork Payette River
- Salmon River main stem - Class III-IV
- Snake River
- Payette River main stem

===== Illinois =====
- Vermillion River

===== Minnesota =====
- Baptism River
- Devil Track River
- Kettle River Class III-IV at Banning State Park
- Lester River
- Saint Louis River
- St. Croix River (Wisconsin–Minnesota) at Interstate State Park
- Temperance River

===== Montana =====
- Clarks Fork Yellowstone River
- Gallatin River
- Madison River
- Stillwater River
- Boulder River
- Yellowstone River
- Middle Fork of the Flathead
- Big Timber Creek
- Sun River

===== Oregon =====
River flow information is available from the USGS and Pat Welch River gauges
River forecast data available through National Weather Service

Popular whitewater rivers in Oregon:

- Alsea River, Upper North Fork (Class 3 (5))
- Blue River (Oregon), (Class 4 (5))
- Breitenbush River (Class 4)
- Bull Run River - Site of slalom course
- Calapooia River, the upper upper section (Class 3 (4))
- Clackamas River - Year-round water, proximity to Portland, and a range of runs make this a popular river.
  - Barton to Carver (Class 2)
  - Carver to Clackamette (Class 2)
  - Bob's to Memaloose (Class 2)
  - Fish Creek to Bob's (Class 3–4) - runnable year round (in kayaks, canoes, and rafts)
  - Three Lynx to Fish Creek (Class 3–4) - runnable winter through late Spring most years.
  - Killer Fang (Class 4)
  - June Creek (Class 4)
- Collawash River
  - Middle (Class 3+ to 4)
  - Upper section (Class 4+ to 5-)
- Coquille River
  - Black Rock Fork of the South Fork (Class 4 (5))
  - Brewster Canyon, East Fork Coquille (Class 5)
  - Lower (Class 3–4)
  - South Fork (Coal Creek Canyon) (Class 4 (5))
  - Upper South Fork (The Gem) (Class 5)
  - Upper Upper South Fork (Cataract Canyon) (Class 5+ to 6)
- Crooked River (Class 4)
- Deschutes River
  - Canyon Run (class 4 (5))
  - Lower Deschutes (Class 3)
  - Riverhouse Run (Class 4)
  - Dillon Falls to Meadow Camp (Class 4 (5))
  - Upper Upper - Benham Falls (Class 5)
- Grande Ronde River
- Hood River
  - Upper Middle Fork (Class 4-4+)
  - Upper East Fork (Class 4+)
- Illinois River (Class 4+ - 5)
- John Day River
- Little River upper section (Class 4 (5))
- McKenzie River headwaters (Class 4–5)
- Middle Santiam River concussion run (Class 4)
- Molalla River
  - Table Rock Fork (Class 3 (4))
  - Three Bears (Class 3 (4))
  - North Fork (Class 4+)
  - Table Rock Fork Gorge (Class 4 - 5)
- Nehalem River
- North Fork Middle Fork Willamette River
  - Miracle Mile (Class 5)
  - Headwaters (Class 5)
  - Lower Gorge (Class 4)
- North Santiam River
  - Niagara section (Class 3, 4, 5)
  - Little North Santiam River
    - Opal Creek headwaters (Class 4 - 5)
    - Upper Opal Creek (Class 4+)
    - Lower Opal Creek (Class 4 (5))
    - Opal Gorge (Class 4 - 5)
- Owyhee River
  - Lower Canyon (Class 3)
  - Upper Canyon (Class 4 (5))
- Roaring River (Clackamas River) (Class 4+ - 5)
- Rogue River This river was one of about four that was selected for filming The River Wild. A good challenge for intermediate kayakers. Excellent fishing location and source is located close to Crater Lake.
  - Middle Fork Gorge (Class 4+ - 5)
  - North Fork, Natural Bridge Section (Class 4 (6))
  - North Fork, Mill Creek Section: (Class 4+)
  - North Fork, Takilma Gorge (Class 4+)
- Salmon River (Class 5-5+)
- Salmonberry River (Class 3+ (5, 6))
- Sandy River Gorge (Class 4)
  - Sandy Gorge (Class 5 (6))
  - Revenue Bridge to Dodge Park
  - Dodge Park to Oxbow Park
  - Oxbow to Columbia (Class 2)
- Siletz River North Fork (Class 3–4)
- Smith River
  - Hole Gorge (Class 4)
  - Lower South Fork Gorge (Class 4+)
  - Upper South Fork Gorge (Class 5)
- South Santiam River
  - Soda Fork (Class 5)
  - Monster Section (Class 4 (6))
  - Mountain House Section: (Class 5)
- South Umpqua River Three Falls Section (Class 3 (4–5))
- Umpqua River
- White River
  - Lower (Class 3 (4))
  - Upper (Class 3 - 4 (4))
  - Celestial Gorge (Class 6)
- Wilson River, Devil's Lake Fork (Headwaters Run) (Class 4+)

===== Washington =====
The most popular runs in Washington are listed below.

- Canyon Creek
- East Fork of the Lewis River
- Green River
- Icicle Creek
- Little White Salmon River
- Skookumchuck Narrows
- Skykomish River
- Snoqualmie River
- Washougal River
- Wenatchee River - Tumwater Canyon
- Wind River
- White Salmon River

===== Wyoming =====
- Clarks Fork Yellowstone River
- Snake River
- Wind River

== Oceania ==
=== Australia ===
- North Johnston River North, QLD
- Tully River North, QLD
- Barron River, Cairns
- Penrith White water stadium, NSW
- Nymboida River, Northern NSW
- Mitta Mitta River, Victoria
- Franklin River, Tasmania
- Avon River, Western Australia

=== New Zealand ===
- Wairoa River (Bay of Plenty) (grade 2–5)
- Kaituna River
- Rangitata River
- Mohaka River (grade 2–5)

== South America ==
=== Chile ===
- Futaleufú River
- Trancura River near Pucón
- Baker River

=== Ecuador ===
- Rio Napo (Napo River) Class 3
- Rio Misahualli (Misahualli River) Class 2

=== Peru ===
- Chili River (near Arequipa)
