= Nahanni (disambiguation) =

Nahanni National Park Reserve is in the Northwest Territories, Canada.

Nahanni may also refer to:

- Nahanni Butte, in the Northwest Territories, Canada
  - Nahanni Butte Airport, that serves the community
  - Nahanni Butte Water Aerodrome, a former water aerodrome that served the community
- South Nahanni River, that flows through the park
- North Nahanni River, a tributary of the Mackenzie River in the Northwest Territories
- Nahanni Formation, a stratigraphical unit of Givetian age in the Western Canadian Sedimentary Basin
- 1985 Nahanni earthquakes, a continuous sequence of earthquakes that began in 1985 in the Nahanni region
- Nahani, an Athapaskan word used to designate native groups located in British Columbia, the Northwest Territories and Yukon
- Nahanni Range Road, Yukon Highway 10, mainly in Yukon but a portion in the Northwest Territories
- North-Wright Airways, formerly known as Nahanni Air Services
- Nahanni (film), a 1962 short documentary
