= Sans Sault Rapids =

The Sans Sault Rapids are a navigational impediment on Canada's Mackenzie River, in the Northwest Territories. The river narrows, and takes a tight turn north, near the river's confluence with the Mountain River, near mile 630. Barry Gough, in his account of explorer Alexander Mackenzie's transit of the river, recounted how Mackenzie's guides described the rapids as "the most difficult, dangerous stretch of the river to canoe." However, he found that his party was able to transit the rapids, and avoid a tedious portage, after all.

Above the rapids the river is several kilometres wide. At the rapids it narrows to less than one kilometre. A rock ridge extends into the river channel, from the east bank. Boaters can avoid the rocks by sticking to the west bank.

The river's only other rapids, the Ramparts, are found 56 kilometres north.

In 1979 a tourist described transiting the river, in Motorboating magazine. He wrote authorities had marked hidden navigational hazards, within the rapids, with navigational buoys—and that many of the buoys were missing, or submerged.
