= Snezhny =

Snezhny (Russian: Сне́жный, lit. 'snowy') may refer to several places in Russia:

- Snezhny, Chelyabinsk Oblast, a settlement in Snezhnensky Selsoviet of Kartalinsky District of Chelyabinsk Oblast
- Snezhny, Khabarovsk Krai, a settlement in Komsomolsky District, Khabarovsk Krai
- Snezhny, Rostov Oblast, a khutor in Komissarovskoye Rural Settlement of Dubovsky District, Rostov Oblast
- Snezhny, Saratov Oblast, a settlement in Petrovsky District, Saratov Oblast
- Snezhny, a ski resort in Korobitsyno, Leningrad Oblast, Russia

== See also ==
- Snezhnoye (disambiguation), a list of places with the neuter form of the name
- Snezhnaya, a river in Russia with the feminine form of the name
- Snezhnye Barsy, junior ice hockey club
