= Snezhnoye =

Snezhnoye (Russian: Сне́жное) may refer to:

- Snezhnoye, Chukotka Autonomous Okrug, a village
- Snezhnoye, Perm Krai, a village in Oktyabrsky District, Perm Krai
- The Russian name of Snizhne, a city in Donetsk Oblast, Ukraine

== See also ==
- Snezhny (disambiguation), places in Russia with the masculine form of the placename
- Snezhnaya, a river in Russia with the feminine form of the placename
