= Mackenzie River =

River in northern Canada

Mackenzie River French: Le fleuve Mackenzie, Slavey: Deh-Cho, Gwich'in: Nagwichoonjik, Inuvialuktun: Kuukpak, Michif: Grande Rivière
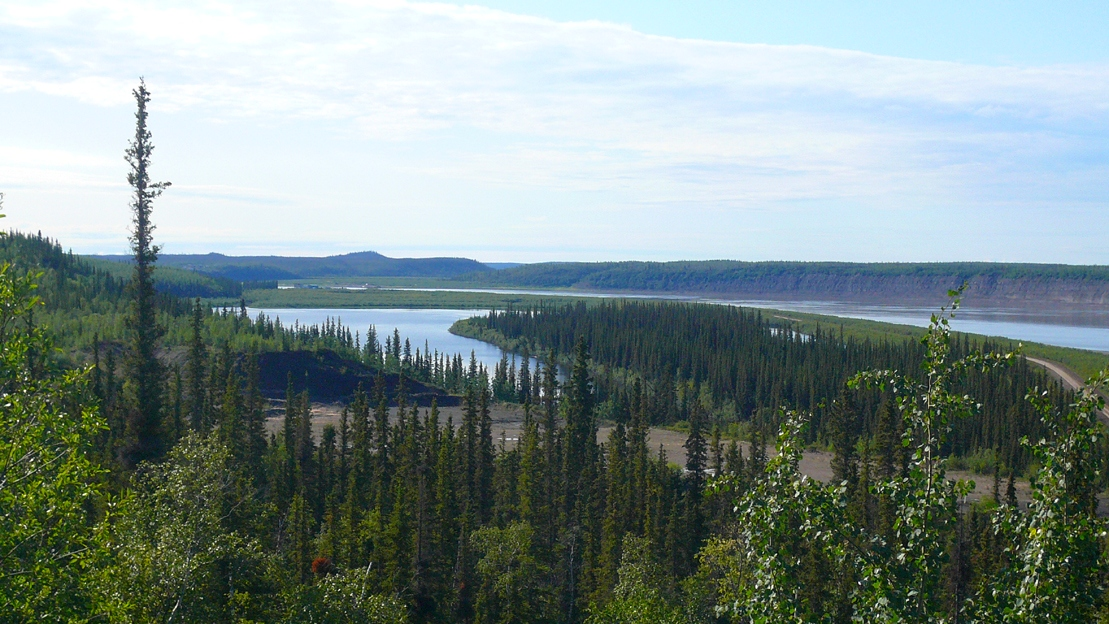
- The Mackenzie River in August 2009

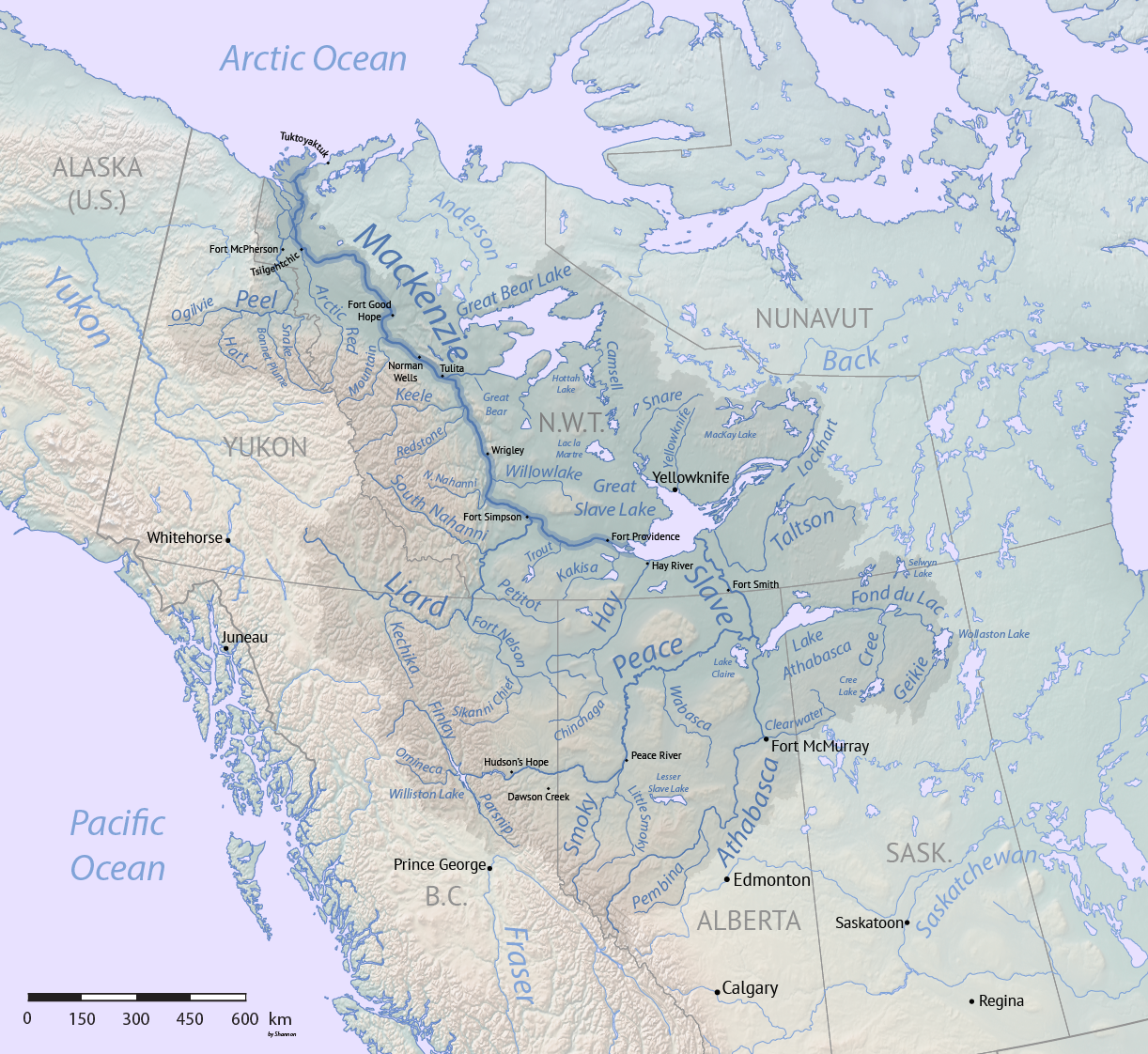
- Map of the Mackenzie River watershed
- Etymology: Alexander Mackenzie, explorer

Location
- Country: Canada
- Territories: Northwest Territories; Yukon
- Cities: Fort Providence; Fort Simpson; Wrigley; Tulita; Norman Wells; Fort Good Hope; Tsiigehtchic; Inuvik

Physical characteristics
- Source: Great Slave Lake
  - location: Fort Providence
  - coordinates: 61°12′15″N 117°22′31″W
  - elevation: 156 m (512 ft)
- 2nd source: Most distant source of the Mackenzie–Slave–Peace–Finlay–Thutade system
  - location: Headwater of Thutade Creek: a glacier snout on the south-west slopes of Alma Peak.
  - coordinates: 56°44′53″N 127°30′38″W
  - elevation: 1,990 m (6,530 ft)
- Mouth: Arctic Ocean
  - location: Beaufort Sea, Inuvik Region
  - coordinates: 68°56′23″N 136°10′22″W
  - elevation: 0 m (0 ft)
- Length: 4,241 km (2,635 mi)
- Basin size: 1,783,912 km^{2} (688,772 mi^{2}) to 1,805,200 km^{2} (697,000 mi^{2})
- Width
  - minimum: 500 m (1,600 ft)
  - average: 1,600 m (5,200 ft) to 3,200 m (10,500 ft)
  - maximum: 6,000 m (20,000 ft) to 7,000 m (23,000 ft)
- Depth
  - average: 8 m (26 ft) to 9 m (30 ft)
  - maximum: 40 m (130 ft) to 45 m (148 ft)
- Discharge
  - location: Mackenzie Delta, Beaufort Sea, Canada
  - average: (Period of data: 1948-1988)10,338 m^{3}/s (365,100 cu ft/s) (Period of data: 1984-2018)310 km^{3}/a (9,800 m^{3}/s) (Period of data: 1973-2011)10,300 m^{3}/s (360,000 cu ft/s) 9,910 m^{3}/s (350,000 cu ft/s) to 12,000 m^{3}/s (420,000 cu ft/s)
- Discharge
  - location: Tsiigehtchic (Arctic Red - Basin size: 1,680,000 km^{2} (650,000 sq mi) to 1,717,754 km^{2} (663,229 sq mi))
  - average: (Period of data: 1971-2015)9,211 m^{3}/s (325,300 cu ft/s) (Period of data: 1940-2017)288 km^{3}/a (9,100 m^{3}/s)
  - minimum: 2,180 m^{3}/s (77,000 cu ft/s)
  - maximum: 35,000 m^{3}/s (1,200,000 cu ft/s)
- Discharge
  - location: Fort Simpson (Basin size: 1,270,000 km^{2} (490,000 mi^{2})
  - average: (Period of data: 1938-2000) 6,768.85 m^{3}/s (239,040 cu ft/s)
  - minimum: 1,590 m^{3}/s (56,000 cu ft/s)
  - maximum: 19,700 m^{3}/s (700,000 cu ft/s)

Basin features
- Tributaries
  - left: Liard River, Keele River, Arctic Red River, Peel River
  - right: Great Bear River

The Mackenzie River (French: Fleuve (de) Mackenzie; Slavey: Deh-Cho [tèh tʃʰò], literally big river; Inuvialuktun: Kuukpak [kuːkpɑk], literally great river) is a river in the Canadian boreal forest and tundra. It forms, along with the Slave, Peace, and Finlay, the longest river system in Canada, the second largest drainage basin of any North American river after the Mississippi.

The Mackenzie River flows through a vast, thinly populated region of forest and tundra entirely within the Northwest Territories in Canada, although its many tributaries reach into five other Canadian provinces and territories. The river's main stem is 1,738 kilometres (1,080 mi) long, flowing north-northwest from Great Slave Lake into the Arctic Ocean, where it forms a large delta at its mouth. Its extensive watershed drains about 20 percent of Canada. It is the largest river flowing into the Arctic from North America, and including its tributaries has a total length of 4,241 kilometres (2,635 mi), registering the 13th longest river system and 12th largest drainage basin on Earth.

The ultimate source of the Mackenzie River is Thutade Lake, in the Northern Interior of British Columbia. The Mackenzie valley is believed to have been the path taken by prehistoric peoples during the initial human migration from Asia to North America over 10,000 years ago, despite sparse evidence. The Inuvialuit, Gwich'in and other Indigenous peoples lived along the river for thousands of years. The river provided the major route into Canada's northern interior for early European explorers.

Economic development remains limited along the river. During the 19th century, fur trading became a lucrative business, but this was affected by harsh weather conditions. The discovery of oil at Norman Wells in the 1920s began a period of industrialization in the Mackenzie valley. Metallic minerals have been found along the eastern and southern edges of the basin; these include uranium, gold, lead, and zinc. Agriculture remains prevalent along the south, particularly in the Peace River area. Various tributaries and headwaters of the river have been developed for hydroelectricity production, flood control and irrigation.

== Geography ==
=== Headwaters ===
Through its many tributaries, the Mackenzie River basin covers portions of five Canadian provinces and territories — British Columbia (BC), Alberta, Saskatchewan, Yukon, and the Northwest Territories. Thutade Lake, in the Northern Interior of BC, is the ultimate source of the Mackenzie River via the Finlay–Peace River system, which stretches 1,923 kilometres (1,195 mi) through BC and Alberta. The 1,231-kilometre (765 mi) Athabasca River originates further south, in Jasper National Park in southwest Alberta. Together, the Peace and Athabasca rivers drain a significant portion of the eastern slope of the Rocky Mountains and the central Alberta prairie. The Peace contributes the majority of the water, about 66 km^{3} (54 million acre-feet) per year, and the Athabasca contributes 25 km^{3} (20 million acre-feet).

The Peace and Athabasca meet at the Peace-Athabasca Delta, a vast inland delta at the western end of Lake Athabasca, which also takes runoff from the northern third of Saskatchewan. The Slave River is formed by the confluence of the two rivers and flows 415 kilometres (258 mi) due north into Great Slave Lake, at Fort Resolution, Northwest Territories. The Slave is by far the largest river flowing into the lake, with an annual flow of 108 km^{3} (87 million acre-feet). It contributes about 77% of the overall inflow, and forms a large delta where it enters the lake. Other rivers entering Great Slave Lake are the Taltson, Lockhart and Hay Rivers, the latter of which also extends into Alberta and BC.

=== Main stem ===
The Mackenzie River issues from the western end of Great Slave Lake about 150 kilometres (93 mi) south-west of Yellowknife. The channel is initially several kilometres wide but narrows to about 800 metres (2,600 ft) at Fort Providence, which was historically an important ferry crossing in the summer, and used as an ice bridge in the winter for traffic along the Yellowknife Highway. In 2012 the Deh Cho Bridge was completed at a point about 10 kilometres (6.2 mi) upstream, providing a safer permanent crossing. It is the only bridge across the main stem of the Mackenzie. West of Fort Providence the Mackenzie widens considerably, resembling a shallow, swampy lake more than a river; one large widening here is known as Mills Lake.

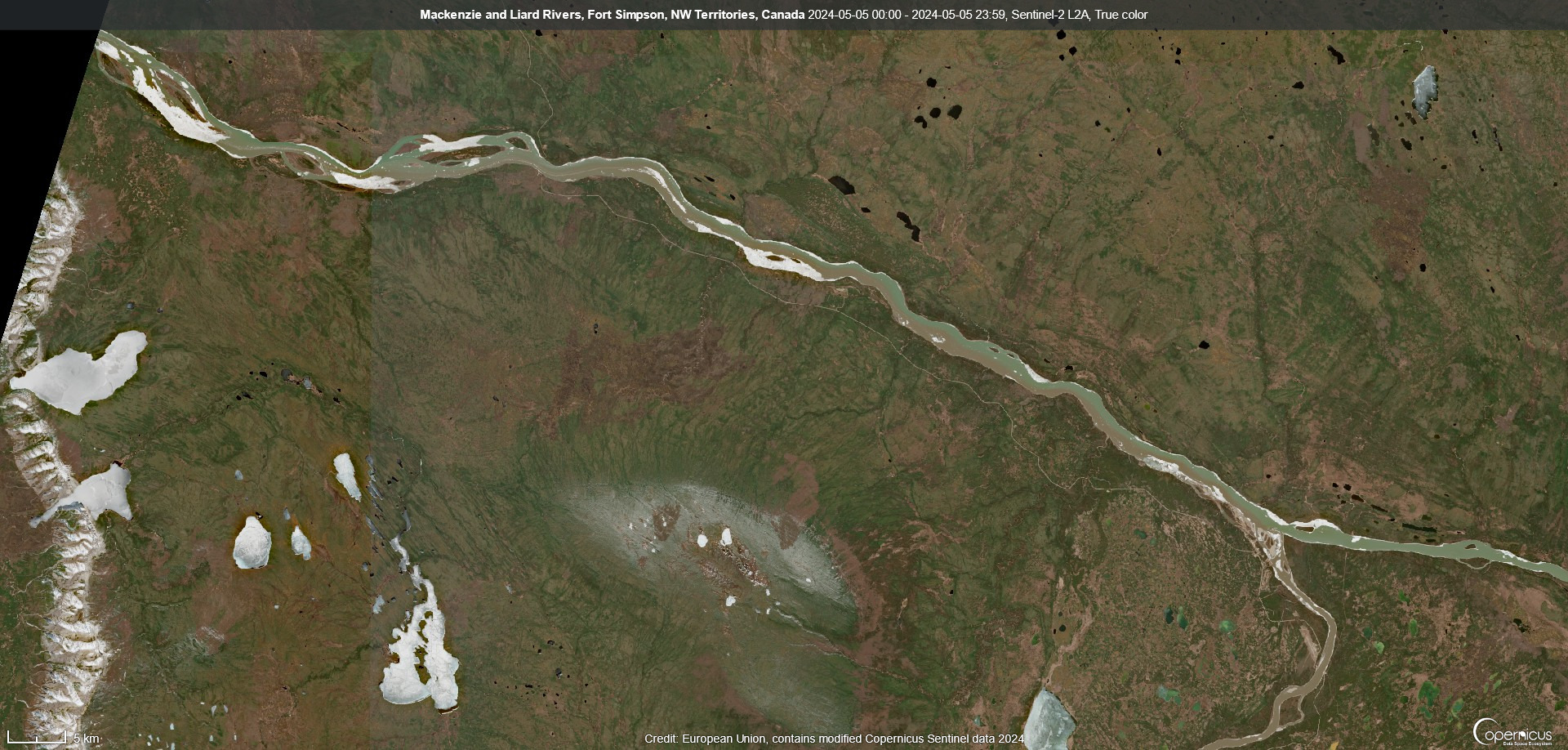
Sentinel-2 True Colour satellite image of the confluence of the Laird and Mackenzie Rivers, showing the characteristic sediment pattern: muddy water from the Laird flowing in from the South paints the water on the Western bank brown while water on the eastern bank is relatively clear for a long stretch of the river. White spots are ice floes. The original image can be accessed at https://link.dataspace.copernicus.eu/nc5e

After heading west for about 100 kilometres (62 mi) the Mackenzie narrows and turns northwest through a long stretch of fast water and rapids, past the village of Jean Marie River. At Fort Simpson it is joined by the Liard River, its biggest direct tributary, from the west. The Liard drains a large area in the southern Yukon and northern British Columbia and carries a large amount of sediment during the summer melt which does not fully mix with the clear water in the Mackenzie for almost 500 kilometres (310 mi) downstream, resulting in a clear current on the east bank and muddy water on the west bank.

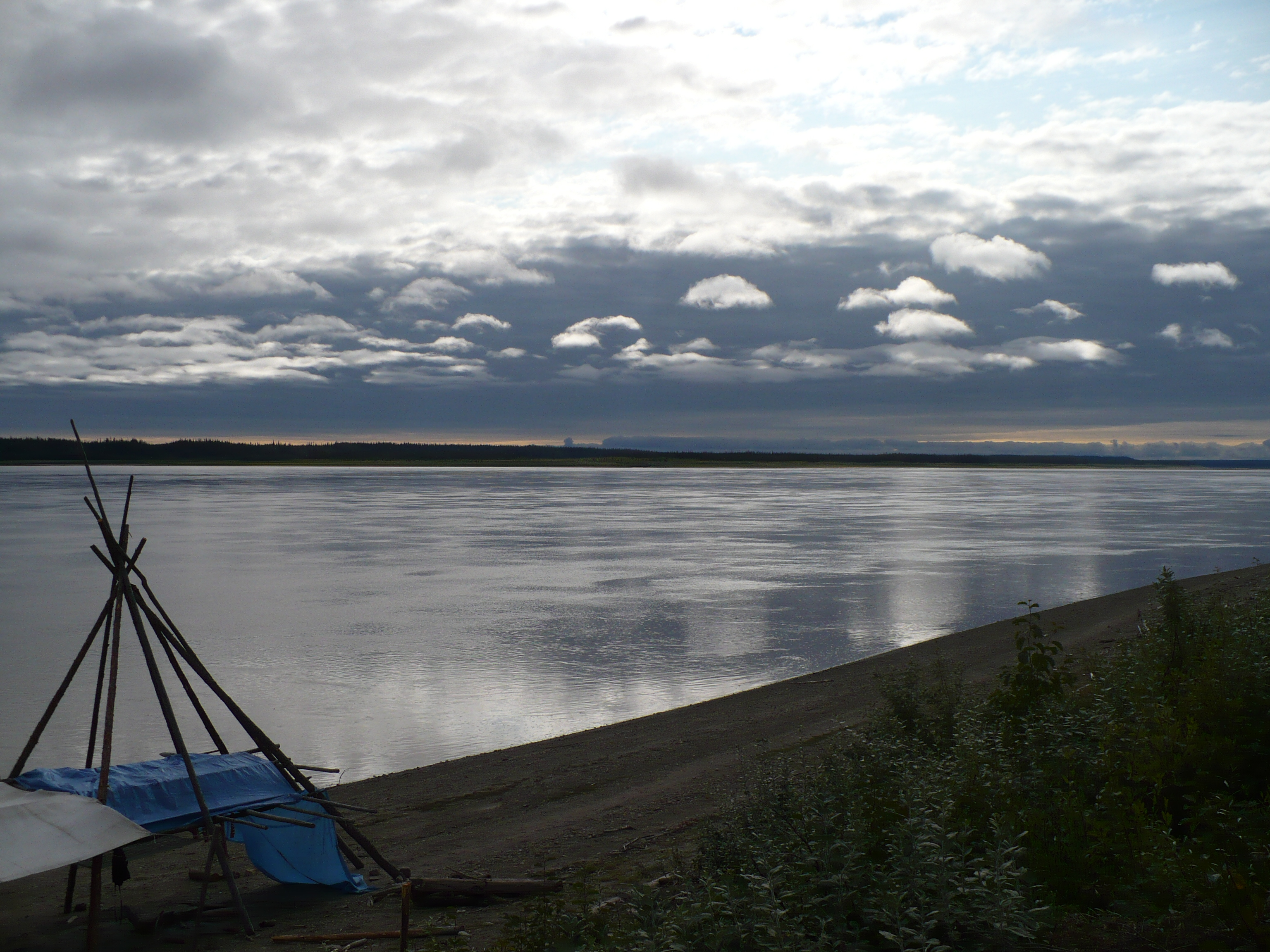
Dene fishing camp on the Mackenzie River, north of the Arctic Circle

The river continues west-northwest until its confluence with the North Nahanni River, where it turns north towards the Arctic. It flows through open taiga with its wide valley bounded, on the west, by the Mackenzie Mountains and to the east by low hills of the Canadian Shield. This mostly uninhabited area is called the Mackenzie Lowlands; although partly forested, it is mostly covered by large areas of muskeg, swamps and many small lakes. A number of major tributaries join from the west, including the Root River, Redstone River and Keele River. Below the Keele River, the Mackenzie River flows north along the western base of the Franklin Mountains before turning northwest, and receives the Great Bear River, the outflow of Great Bear Lake at Tulita.

The Mackenzie widens considerably to about 6 to 7 kilometres (3.7 to 4.3 mi) at Norman Wells, a major centre of oil production. There is a narrows at the Mountain River confluence called the Sans Sault Rapids, where the Mackenzie falls about 6 metres (20 ft). Below the Mountain River the Mackenzie flows due north until reaching The Ramparts, a limestone gorge barely 500 metres (1,600 ft) wide and up to 45 metres (148 ft) deep. Below The Ramparts is the village of Fort Good Hope, where the Mackenzie turns northwest again, soon crossing the Arctic Circle. The Mackenzie here flows slightly lower in elevation than the surrounding tundra, as a braided river between low bluffs about 3 to 5 kilometres (1.9 to 3.1 mi) apart. It receives the Arctic Red River from the southwest at Tsiigehtchic, where traffic on the Dempster Highway crosses via ferry/ice bridge.

About 30 kilometres (19 mi) northwest of Tsiigehtchic is Point Separation, the head of the vast Mackenzie River Delta, whose branching channels, ponds and wetlands spread across more than 12,000 square kilometres (4,600 sq mi) of the coastal plain. The delta is nearly 210 kilometres (130 mi) from north to south, and ranges in width from 50 to 80 kilometres (31 to 50 mi). It is the second biggest Arctic delta in the world, after the Lena River delta in Russia. Most land in the Mackenzie delta consists of permafrost, which reaches as deep as the bedrock. A characteristic feature of the delta is its numerous pingos, or hills of earth-covered-ice – some 1,400 of them. The Peel River, carrying much of the runoff from the northern Yukon, joins in the delta at a point northeast of Fort McPherson. Below there, the Mackenzie diverges into several large channels with the largest heading north-northeast, emptying into the Beaufort Sea west of Tuktoyaktuk. The Mackenzie Delta contains a logjam with 400,000 caches of wood, which stores 3.4 million tons of carbon, equivalent to a year's emissions from 2.5 million cars.

=== Drainage basin ===
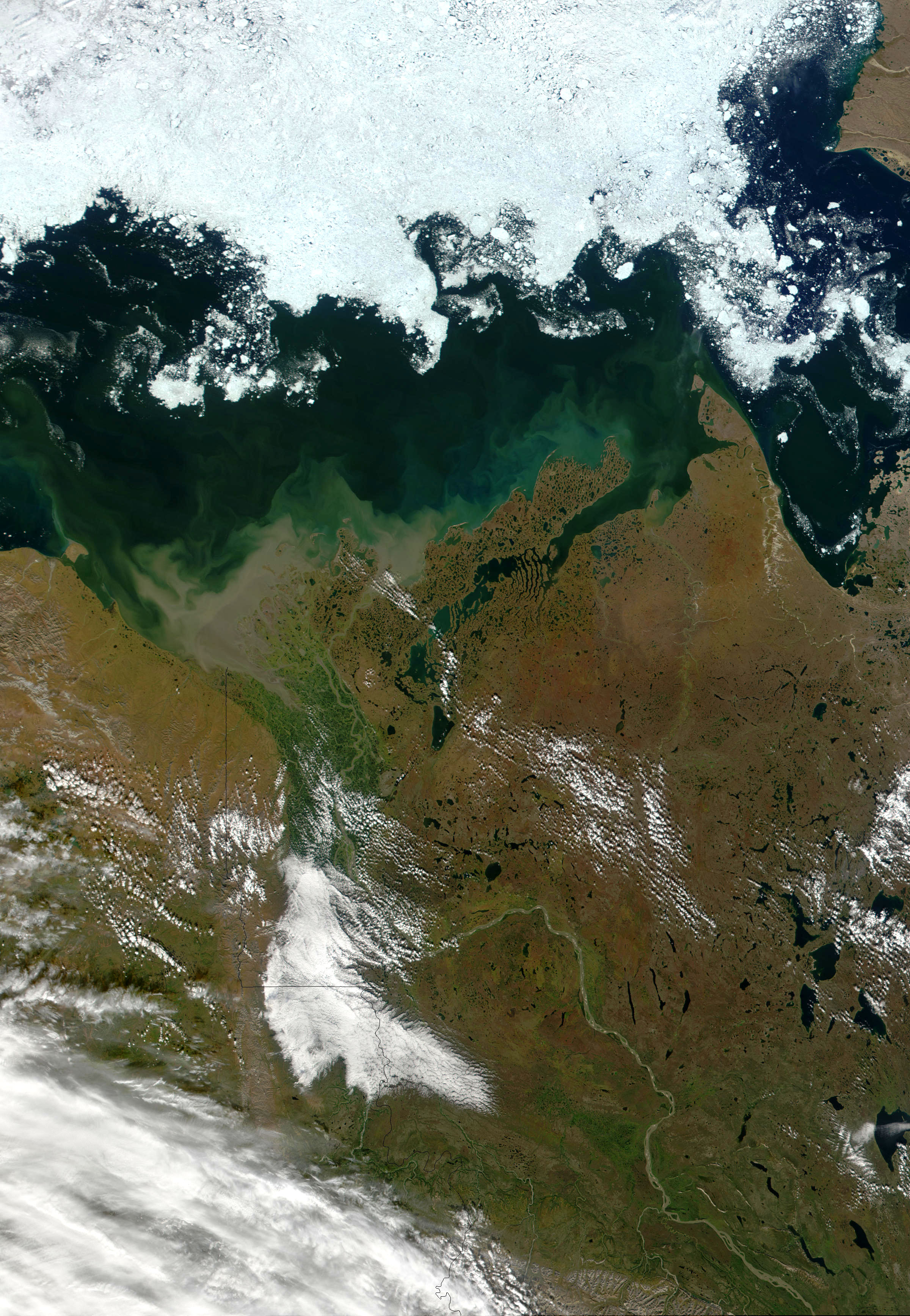
Satellite view of the lower Mackenzie River

At 1,805,000 square kilometres (697,000 sq mi), the Mackenzie River drainage basin encompasses nearly 20 percent of Canada. About 980,000 square kilometres (380,000 sq mi), or 54 percent of the basin, lies above Great Slave Lake. Permafrost underlies about three-quarters of the watershed, reaching up to 100 metres (330 ft) deep in the Mackenzie Delta. As a whole, the Mackenzie basin receives only meager to moderate rainfall, averaging 410 millimetres (16 in) over the entire basin, though mountain areas experience much higher precipitation, and areas near and north of the Arctic Circle receive much lower precipitation. Changes in climate and land cover of the basin are rapidly being reflected in its altered cryosphere and hydrology.

The Mackenzie drainage basin is bordered by multiple major North American watersheds. Much of the western edge of the Mackenzie basin runs along the Continental Divide. The divide separates the Mackenzie watershed from that of the Yukon River, which flows to the Bering Strait; and the Fraser River and Columbia River systems, both of which empty into the Pacific Ocean. Lowland divides in the north separate the Mackenzie basin from the Arctic Ocean watersheds of the Anderson, Horton, Coppermine and Back Rivers. In the east, the Mackenzie borders on the Hudson Bay watersheds of the Thelon and Churchill Rivers, and to the south it is bordered by the Saskatchewan–Nelson River system, which also empties into Hudson Bay. The Mackenzie system is hydrologically connected to the Hudson Bay watershed via Wollaston Lake, which is not only the source of the Fond du Lac tributary of Lake Athabasca, but also of the Cochrane River, which flows east into the Churchill River.

The eastern portion of the Mackenzie basin is dominated by vast reaches of lake-studded boreal forest and includes many of the largest lakes in North America. By both volume and surface area, Great Bear Lake is the biggest in the watershed and third largest on the continent, with a surface area of 31,153 square kilometres (12,028 sq mi) and a volume of 2,236 cubic kilometres (536 cu mi). Great Slave Lake is slightly smaller, with an area of 28,568 square kilometres (11,030 sq mi) and containing 2,088 cubic kilometres (501 cu mi) of water, although it is significantly deeper than Great Bear. The third major lake, Athabasca, is less than a third that size with an area of 7,800 square kilometres (3,000 sq mi). Six other lakes in the watershed cover more than 1,000 square kilometres (390 sq mi), including the Williston Lake reservoir, the second-largest artificial lake in North America, on the Peace River.

=== Flow characteristics ===
The river discharges more than 325 cubic kilometres (78 cu mi) of water each year, accounting for roughly 11% of the total river flow into the Arctic Ocean. The river is frozen for most of the year, with the ice typically breaking up by early to mid-May in the south, and late May-early June in the north. Ice breaks up earlier on the tributaries, sometimes causing ice jams and flooding where they meet the Mackenzie. In the middle of the larger lakes, such as Great Slave, ice can persist as late as mid-June. The river typically freezes by late October or November, starting in the north. Year round, the Mackenzie's outflow has a major stabilizing effect in the local climate above the Arctic Ocean with large amounts of warmer fresh water mixing with the cold seawater.

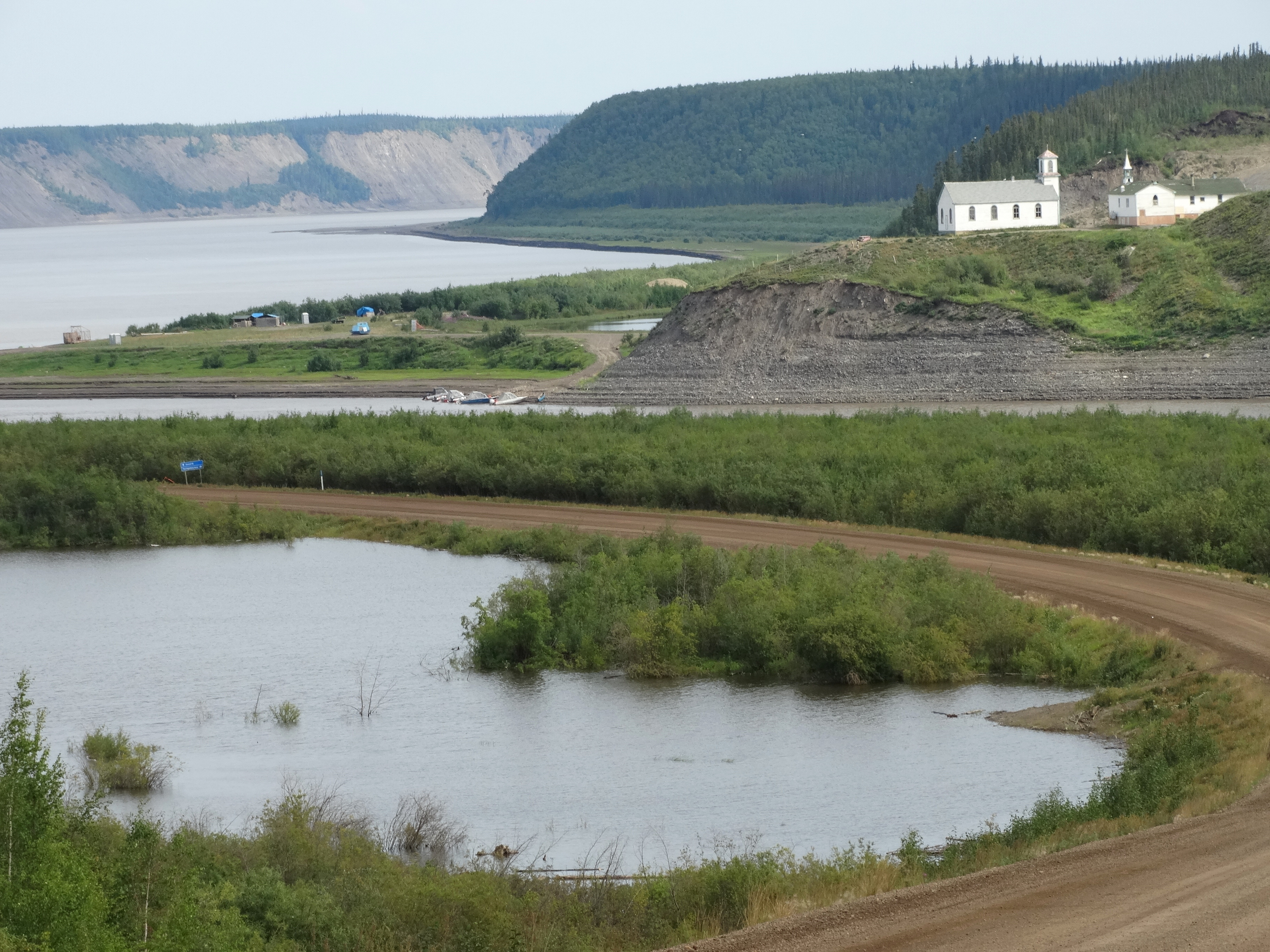
Mackenzie at Tsiigehtchic

The average flow rate at the mouth is 9,910 m^{3}/s (350,000 cu ft/s), the second largest in Canada after the St Lawrence, and the fourteenth largest in the world. About 60 percent of the water comes from the western half of the basin, which includes the Rocky, Selwyn, and Mackenzie mountain ranges out of which spring major tributaries such as the Peace and Liard Rivers, which contribute 23 and 27 percent of the total flow, respectively. In contrast the eastern half, despite being dominated by marshland and large lakes, provides only about 25 percent of the Mackenzie's discharge.

During peak flow in the spring, the difference in discharge between the two halves of the watershed becomes even more marked. While large amounts of snow and glacial melt dramatically drive up water levels in the Mackenzie's western tributaries, large lakes to the east retard springtime discharges. Spring floods from the Peace-Athabasca system are significantly slowed by the delta area at the western end of Lake Athabasca causing the lake to rise, and the excess water can only flow out after the rivers have receded. The same phenomenon occurs at Great Slave Lake, which naturally regulates the flow from the Slave River into the Mackenzie.

There are river gauges at several upstream points along the Mackenzie River. The average flow rate at the outlet of Great Slave Lake is 4,269 m^{3}/s (150,800 cu ft/s). At Fort Simpson, below the Liard River, it is 6,769 m^{3}/s (239,000 cu ft/s). At Norman Wells it is 8,446 m^{3}/s (298,300 cu ft/s), and at the Arctic Red confluence it is 8,926 m^{3}/s (315,200 cu ft/s).

Mackenzie monthly mean discharge at Arctic Red River (m^{3}/s)

== Geology ==
As recently as the last glacial maximum about 30,000 years ago, the majority of northern Canada was buried under the enormous continental Laurentide Ice Sheet. The tremendous erosive powers of the Laurentide and its predecessors, at maximum extent, completely buried what is now the Mackenzie watershed under thousands of metres of ice and flattened the eastern portions of the watershed. When the ice sheet receded for the last time, it left a 1,100-kilometre (680 mi) long proglacial lake, Lake McConnell, of which Great Bear, Great Slave and Athabasca Lakes are remnants.

Today's Mackenzie River is very young in geologic terms – its channel formed over a period of no more than several thousand years as the ice sheet retreated. Prior to the ice ages, only the Peel River tributary flowed through what is now the Mackenzie Delta into the Arctic Ocean. The other tributaries of the Mackenzie combined into the Paleo-Bell River which flowed east into Hudson Bay. During glaciation the weight of the ice sheet depressed northern Canada's terrain to such an extent that when the ice retreated, the Mackenzie system was captured to lower elevations in the northwest, establishing the present flow direction to the Arctic.

Fluvial deposits and other erosional evidence indicate that around the end of the Pleistocene, about 13,000 years ago, the Mackenzie channel was scoured by one or more massive glacial lake outburst floods unleashed from Lake Agassiz, formed by melting ice west of the present-day Great Lakes. At its peak, Agassiz had a greater volume than all present-day freshwater lakes combined. This is believed to have disrupted currents in the Arctic Ocean and led to an abrupt 1,300-year-long cold temperature shift called the Younger Dryas.

The Mackenzie carries a very large sediment load, transporting about 128 million tonnes each year to its delta. The Liard River alone accounts for 32 percent of the total, and the Peel River about 20 percent. Essentially all of the sediment is contributed by areas downstream of Fort Providence, since upstream sediment is trapped in Great Slave Lake.

== Ecology ==
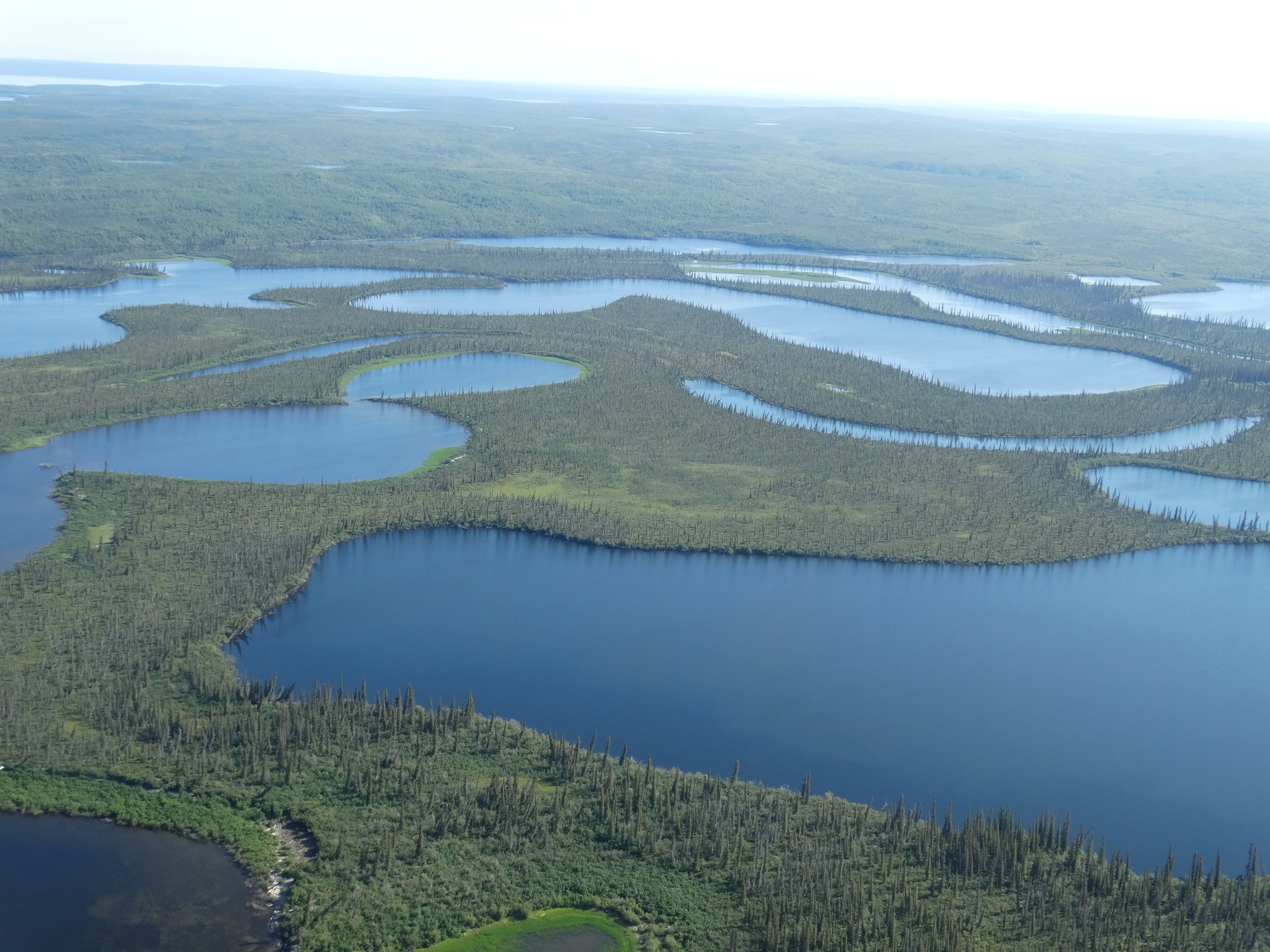
Lakes and black spruce forest in the Mackenzie Delta

The Mackenzie River's watershed is considered one of the largest and most intact ecosystems in North America, especially the northern half. Approximately 63% of the drainage basin, or 1,137,000 square kilometres (439,000 sq mi), is forested (mostly boreal forest). Wetlands comprise about 18%, or about 324,900 square kilometres (125,400 sq mi), of the basin. More than 93% of forested areas are virgin old-growth forest. However, human activities such as oil extraction have threatened water quality in the headwaters of the Mackenzie River. In addition, a warming climate in northern parts of the watershed is melting permafrost and destabilizing soil through erosion.

Most of the taiga consists of black spruce, aspen and poplar forest. In the north, the river's shores are lined with sparse vegetation like dwarf birch and willows, as well as extensive areas of muskeg and peat bogs. South of Great Slave Lake, there are much larger reaches of temperate and alpine forest, prairie, and fertile floodplain and riparian habitat.

There are 53 fish species in the basin, none of them endemic. The Mackenzie River has a similar range of fish fauna to the Mississippi River system. It is believed that the two river systems were connected during the Ice Ages by meltwater lakes and channels, allowing fish in the two rivers to interbreed. Fish in the Mackenzie River proper include the northern pike, several minnow species, and lake whitefish. Fish in the southern half of the watershed are genetically isolated from those of the northern half due to large rapids on the Slave River preventing fish from swimming upstream.

Migratory birds use the three major deltas in the Mackenzie River basin — the Mackenzie Delta and the inland Slave and Peace-Athabasca Deltas — as resting and breeding areas. The latter is located at the convergence of four major North American migratory routes, or flyways. As recently as the mid-twentieth century, more than 400,000 birds passed through during the spring and up to a million in autumn. Some 215 bird species in total have been catalogued in the delta, including species such as the whooping crane, peregrine falcon, and the bald eagle. The construction of the W.A.C. Bennett Dam on the Peace River has reduced the seasonal variations of water levels in the delta, causing damage to its ecosystem. Bird populations have seen a steady decline since the 1960s.

Water mammals such as beavers and muskrats are extremely common in the Mackenzie Delta and surrounding areas of muskeg. The Mackenzie estuary is also a calving area for beluga whales.

== History ==
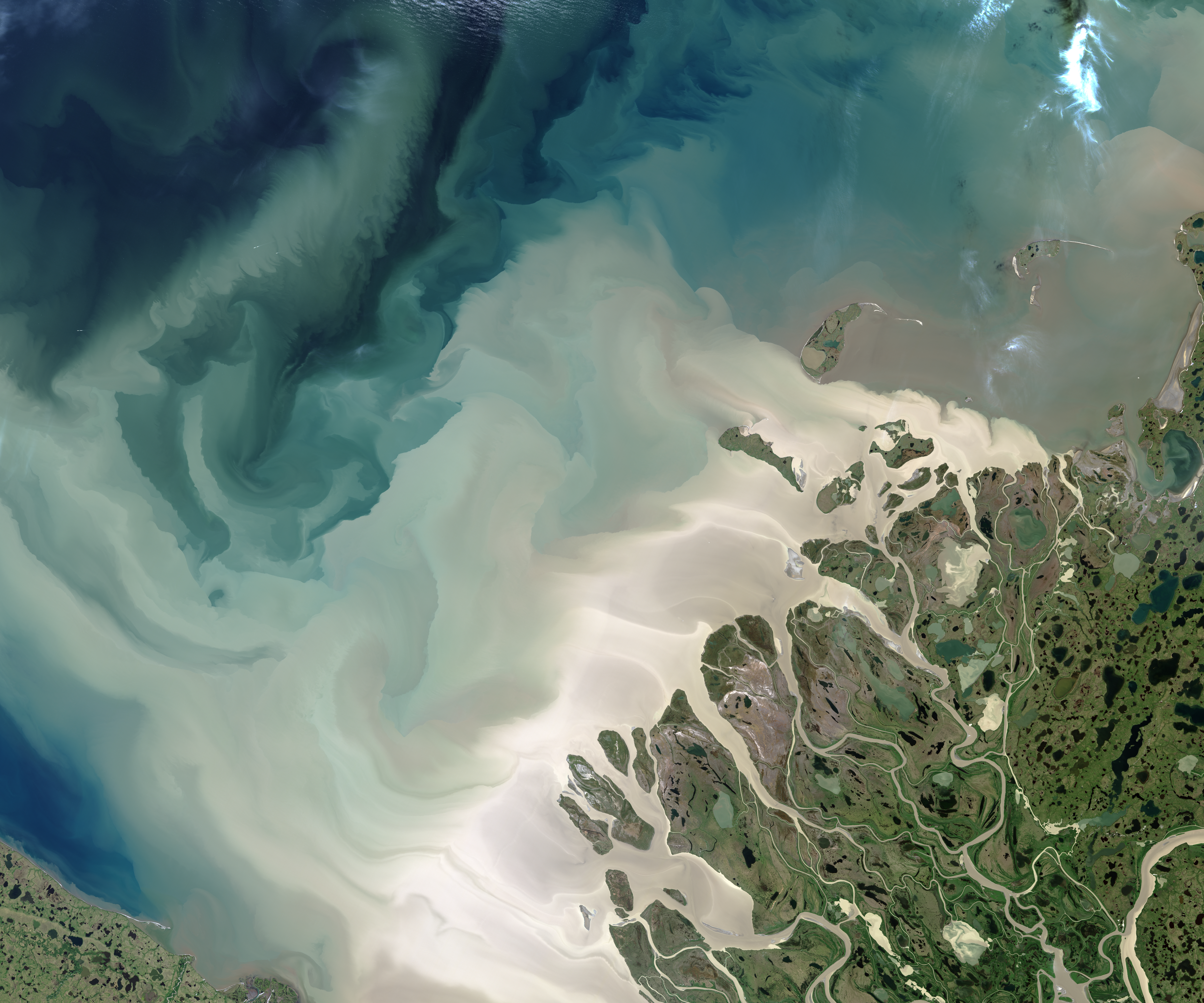
The Mackenzie River enters the Beaufort Sea, July 2017. About 7 percent of the fresh water that flows into the Arctic Ocean each year comes out the Mackenzie and its delta, and much of that comes in large pulses in June and July after the freshet—when inland ice and snow melts and floods the river.

The Mackenzie valley is believed to have been the path taken by prehistoric peoples during the initial human migration from Asia to North America more than 10,000 years ago. However, archaeological evidence of human habitation along the Mackenzie is scant, despite the efforts of many researchers. Many archaeological sites have probably been destroyed by flooding, freeze-thaw and erosion. The Inuvialuit, Gwich'in and other Indigenous peoples have lived along the river for thousands of years; however, the oldest known evidence of continuous occupation stretches back only about 1300–1400 years, at the Gwich'in community of Tsiigehtchic.

The Mackenzie provided the major route into Canada's northern interior for European explorers as early as the late 18th century. Scottish explorer Alexander Mackenzie travelled the river in the hope it would lead to the Pacific Ocean, but instead reached its mouth on the Arctic Ocean on 14 July 1789. There is a story, likely apocryphal, that he named it "Disappointment River", but eventually it was named after him. No European reached its mouth again until Sir John Franklin on 16 August 1825 during the 1825–1827 Mackenzie River expedition. The following year he traced the coast west until blocked by ice while John Richardson followed the coast east to the Coppermine River. In 1849 William Pullen reached the Mackenzie from the Bering Strait.

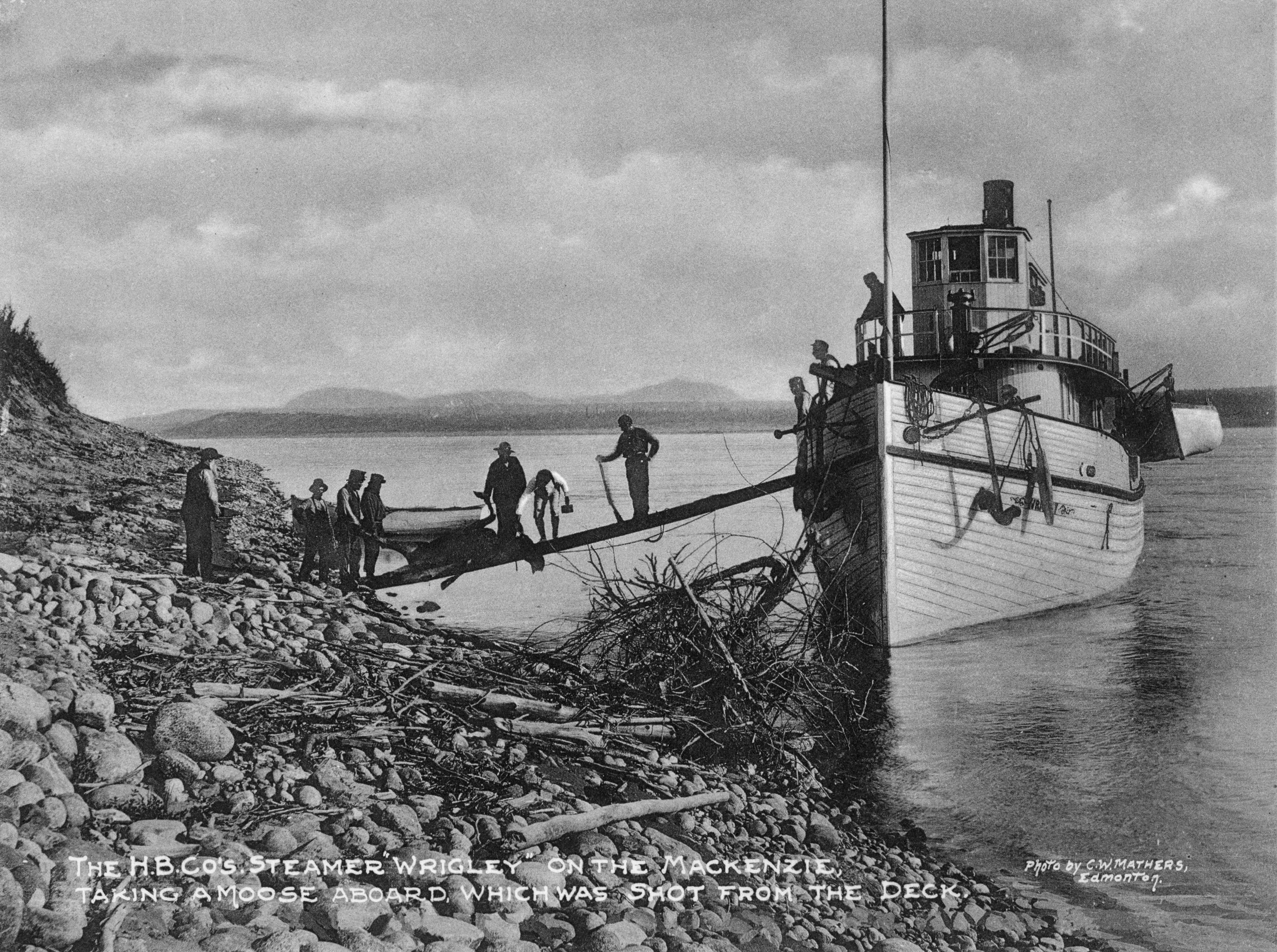
Steamboat Wrigley on the Mackenzie River, c. 1901

In the following decades the North West Company established forts on the river, the precursors of present-day settlements such as Fort Simpson (formerly Fort of the Forks). A lucrative fur trade was carried out, as the Mackenzie basin teemed with beaver and muskrat. However, the short summer and harsh winter conditions limited trappers' activities. During the late 19th century Fort Simpson was regional headquarters for the Hudson's Bay Company. The first fur trappers were native, but starting in the 1920s increasing numbers of European trappers entered the region. Beaver and muskrat populations were heavily depleted, especially in areas around and south of Great Slave Lake.

Catholic missionary Henri Grollier founded missions at Fort Simpson, Fort Norman and Fort Good Hope between 1858 and 1859.

During the late 19th century and early 20th century epidemics of introduced European diseases swept through Indigenous communities along the river, and thousands of native people lost their lives. One particularly severe influenza in 1928 killed as many as one in ten native people along the Mackenzie River. Fort Providence lost 20 percent of its population, and some smaller villages and camps were completely wiped out.

Steamboat service on the Mackenzie River began in the 1880s, and the number of vessels surged in the early 1900s as the Klondike Gold Rush brought a wave of prospectors to the Yukon. The Mackenzie River was one of the main routes into the northern interior, with sternwheelers transporting passengers, domestic supplies and industrial goods from as far upstream as the Athabasca River all the way to the delta, though with several areas such as the huge rapids on the Slave River requiring portages. The route taken by gold seekers started in Edmonton and followed the Athabasca, Slave and Mackenzie Rivers as far as the Peel River, then up the Peel and its tributary the Rat River to the headwaters of the Porcupine River, which flows to the Yukon River. Many who attempted the 3,200-kilometre (2,000 mi) journey died along the way or turned back before reaching the Yukon.

Oil was discovered at Norman Wells in the 1920s, beginning a period of industrialization in the Mackenzie valley. Oil was initially shipped out by steamboats, supplying mines and towns across the NWT. This demand grew when gold was discovered on the northern shore of Great Slave Lake, leading to the settlement of Yellowknife and the opening of several mines in the area. By the 1940s steamboats had been replaced by modern gas and diesel-powered craft, which continue to serve the river today. During World War II oil pumped in Norman Wells was shipped to Fairbanks, Alaska via the 1,000-kilometre (620 mi) Canol pipeline. The pipeline was considered a "fiasco", going five times over budget and losing as much as 20 percent of the oil due to poor construction. It only operated for thirteen months, shutting down in 1945. Much abandoned equipment remains along the corridor today; part of the pipeline route has been designated the Canol Heritage Trail. In 1964 the Mackenzie Northern Railway (now a subsidiary of CN) reached the shore of Great Slave Lake, to serve the new Pine Point zinc mine near Hay River. Although the mine shut down in 1988, the railroad remains an important transportation link between the Mackenzie River waterway and the rest of Canada.

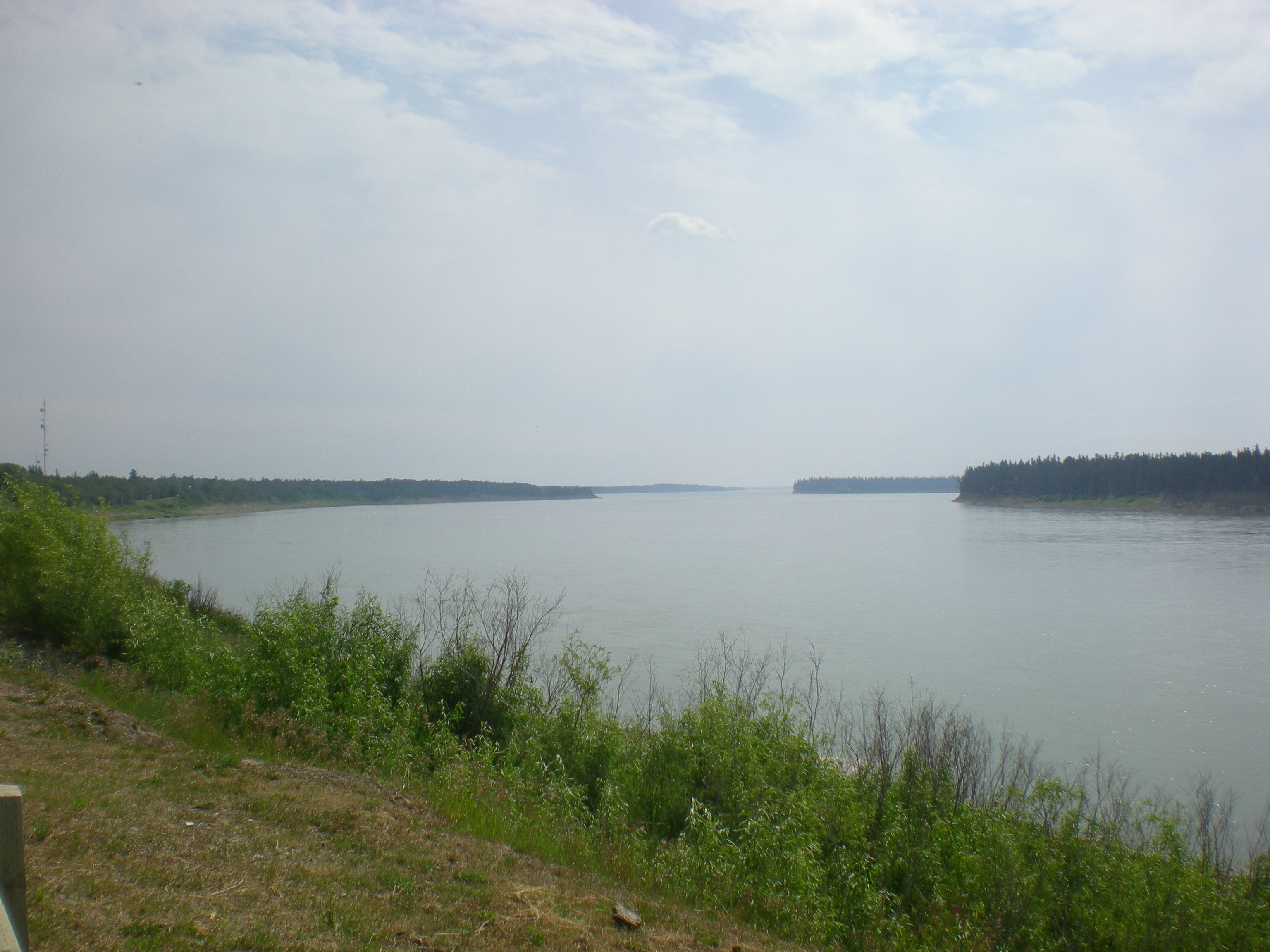
Mackenzie River near its head at Fort Providence

In the 1950s the U.S. Army Corps of Engineers proposed the North American Water and Power Alliance (NAWAPA), a vast series of dams, tunnels and reservoirs designed to move 150 km^{3} (120,000,000 acre⋅ft) of water from northern Canada to southern Canada, the western United States and Mexico. The system would involve building massive dams on the Liard, Mackenzie, Peace, Columbia, and Fraser river systems and pumping water into a 650-kilometre (400 mi) long reservoir in the Rocky Mountain Trench. The water would then flow by gravity to irrigate more than 220,000 square kilometres (85,000 sq mi) in the three countries and generate more than 50,000 MW of surplus energy. The projects were never built due to the massive cost and environmental impact.

The Royal Canadian Mint honoured the 200th anniversary of the naming of the Mackenzie River with the issue of a silver commemorative dollar in 1989.

In 1997, a cultural landscape along the section of the Mackenzie River at Tsiigehtchic was designated the Nagwichoonjik (Mackenzie River) National Historic Site of Canada due to its cultural, social and spiritual significance to the Gwichya Gwich'in.

In 2008, Canadian and Japanese researchers extracted a constant stream of natural gas from a test project at the Mallik methane hydrate field in the Mackenzie Delta. This was the second such drilling at Mallik: the first took place in 2002 and used heat to release methane. In the 2008 experiment, researchers were able to extract gas by lowering the pressure, without heating, requiring significantly less energy. The Mallik gas hydrate field was first discovered by Imperial Oil in 1971–1972.

== Human use ==
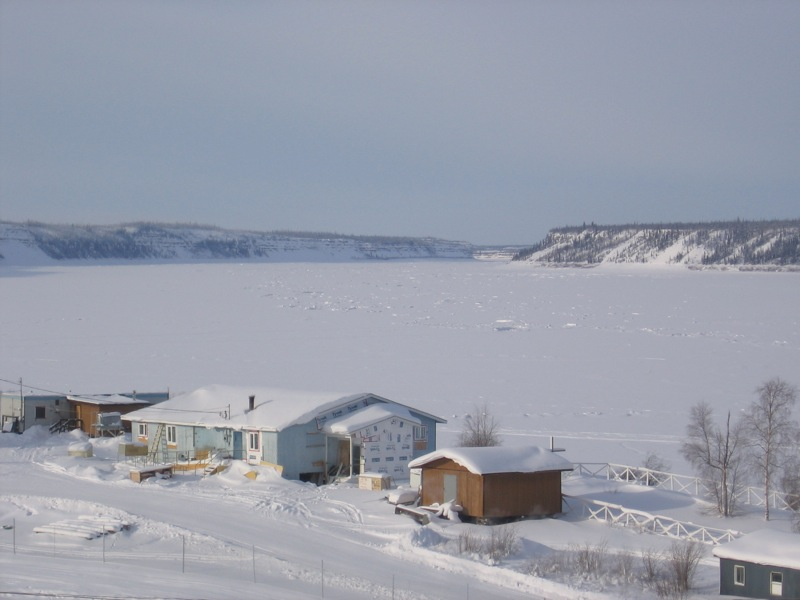
A frozen Mackenzie River at Fort Good Hope, March 2007

As of 2001, approximately 400,000 people lived in the Mackenzie River basin — representing only one percent of Canada's population. Ninety percent of the population lived in the Peace and Athabasca River basins, mostly in Alberta. The cold northern permafrost regions beyond the Arctic Circle are very sparsely populated, mainly by Indigenous peoples. Most of the Mackenzie watershed is unbroken wilderness and human activities have little influence on the overall water quality, although there are some localized impacts.

=== Natural resources ===
Some parts of the Mackenzie basin are rich in natural resources – oil and gas in the Northwest Territories and in central Alberta, lumber in the Peace River headwaters, uranium in Saskatchewan, gold and zinc in the Great Slave Lake area and tungsten in the Yukon. As of 2003 there were two operational gold mines in Yellowknife, and many more abandoned mines dot the region. Communities along the Mackenzie River depend on subsistence fishing, although there is also some commercial fishing on the river.

Agriculture in the Mackenzie River basin is mainly concentrated in the Peace and Athabasca valleys to the south. The valley of the former river is considered to be some of the best northern farmland in Canada, due to the high concentration of minerals found in the soil. These conditions are expected to be improved even more by trends in climate change, such as warmer temperatures and a longer growing season. According to the British Columbia Environmental Network, "there is enough agricultural capability in the Peace River Valley to provide vegetables to all of northern Canada".

The only functioning oil pipeline in the Mackenzie basin connects Norman Wells with Zama City, Alberta. Norman Wells was the main oil-producing area on the Mackenzie River until the 1970s, when new oil fields were discovered further north in the Mackenzie delta and the surrounding coastline. As of 2016, there were an estimated 166 billion barrels of oil reserves in this region. There is a proposal for a Mackenzie Valley Pipeline, which has not been built due to environmental concerns and falling oil and gas prices.

=== Transportation ===
During the ice-free season, the Mackenzie is a major transportation link through the vast wilderness of northern Canada, linking the many isolated communities along its course. Wide, calm sections of the river are frequently used to land seaplanes in the ice-free season. Canada's northernmost major railhead is located at the town of Hay River, on the south shore of Great Slave Lake. Goods shipped there by train and truck are loaded onto barges of the government-owned Marine Transportation Services. In 2016, Northern Transportation Company went bankrupt, and its assets were bought by the government of Northwest Territories.

Barge traffic travels the entire length of the Mackenzie in long "trains" of up to fifteen shallow-draft vessels pulled by tugboats. Goods are shipped as far as the port of Tuktoyaktuk on the eastern end of the Mackenzie Delta, where they are transferred to oceangoing vessels and delivered to communities along Canada's Arctic coast and the numerous islands to the north. In winter, the frozen channel of the Mackenzie River, especially in the delta region, is used as an ice road, firm enough to support large trucks, although travel between northern communities is mostly by dog sleds and snowmobiles.

Although the Mackenzie River is wide and deep, navigation is "notoriously difficult" due to the locations of sandbars and shallows changing from year to year. In some narrower parts of the river, barges must be uncoupled and towed one by one through hazardous stretches, despite attempts to widen and deepening the channel by blasting.

=== Hydroelectricity ===
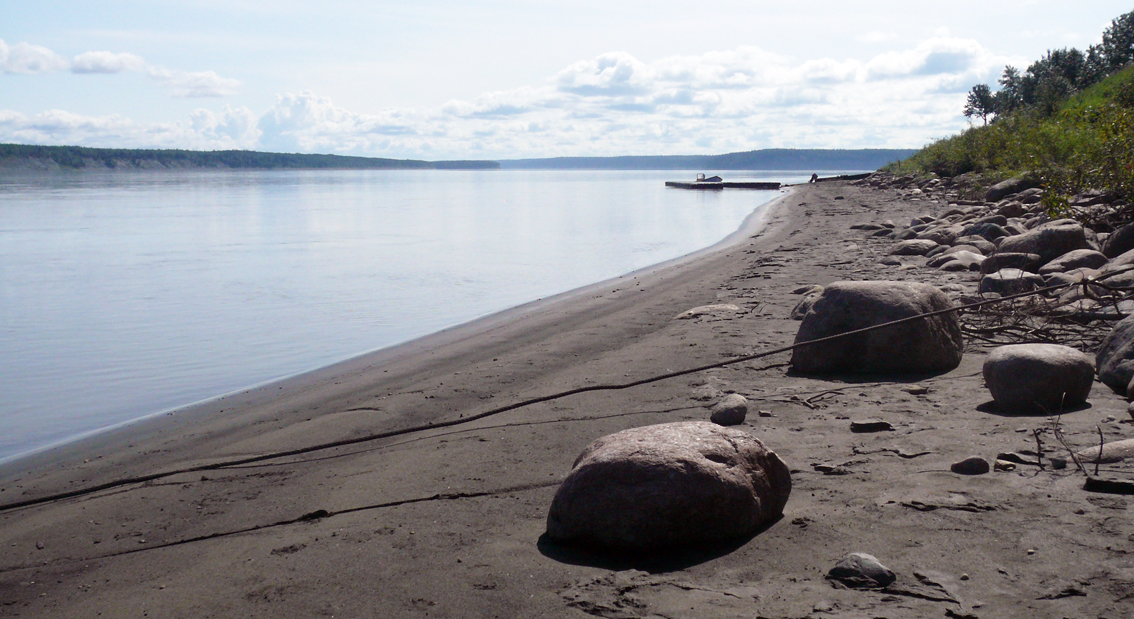
Mackenzie River at Fort Simpson, at the confluence of the Liard River

Although there are no dams along the main stem of the Mackenzie, many of its tributaries and headwaters have been developed for hydroelectricity production, flood control and irrigation. The W.A.C. Bennett, Peace Canyon, and John Horgan hydroelectric dams on the upper Peace River were completed in 1968, 1980, and 2025 by BC Hydro. They have a combined capacity of more than 4,700 megawatts (MW). The reservoir of W.A.C. Bennett, Williston Lake, is the largest body of fresh water in BC and the ninth largest man-made lake in the world, with a volume of 70.3 km^{3} (57,000,000 acre⋅ft). Other smaller hydroelectric plants are located along the Snare and Taltson River tributaries, providing power to mines in the Great Slave Lake region.

By acting as a massive stabilizer on the water flow of the Peace River, Williston Lake reduces flood crests on the Peace, Slave and Mackenzie rivers as far downstream as Fort Good Hope. This has made the Peace Valley more suitable for farming, but has had significant impacts on downstream wildlife and riparian communities. The more stable annual flow slows down the spread of essential nutrients which builds up in the form of sediments, thus causing the river to become more polluted.

There have been proposals to dam other tributaries of the Mackenzie River. A potential US$1 billion, 1350 MW hydro plant on the Slave River was canceled in 2010 after an agreement could not be reached with First Nations people in the area to be flooded by the reservoir.

== Tributaries ==
=== Largest ===
Tributary	Length		Watershed		Discharge	
	km	mi	km^{2}	sq mi	m^{3}/s	cu ft/s
Liard River	1,115	693	277,100	106,989	2,434	85,960
North Nahanni River	200	124				
Root River	220	138				
Redstone River	289	180	16,400	6,332	417	14,726
Keele River	410	255	19,000	7,340	600	21,200
Great Bear River	113	70	156,500	60,425	528	18,646
Mountain River	370	230	13,500	5,212	123	4,344
Arctic Red River	500	311	22,000	8,494	161	5,690
Peel River	580	360	28,400	10,965	689	24,332

=== Full list ===
Tributary	Coordinates
Great Slave Lake	61.19994°N 116.68219°W
Kakisa River	61.06888°N 117.16782°W
Horn River	61.47689°N 118.08234°W
Bouvier River	61.23230°N 119.03584°W
Redknife River	61.22446°N 119.36891°W
Trout River	61.30423°N 119.84453°W
Jean Marie River	61.53288°N 120.63469°W
Spence River	61.58009°N 120.67331°W
Rabbitskin River	61.78209°N 120.69758°W
Liard River	61.85037°N 121.30185°W
Harris River	61.87277°N 121.32580°W
Martin River	61.92633°N 121.57814°W
Trail River	62.10005°N 122.19286°W
North Nahanni River	62.24562°N 123.32874°W
Root River	62.43685°N 123.31020°W
Willowlake River	62.69863°N 123.1148°W
River Between Two Mountains	62.93655°N 123.21081°W
Wrigley River	63.24410°N 123.58691°W
Ochre River	63.46801°N 123.68962°W
Johnson River	63.71486°N 123.91245°W
Blackwater River	63.94386°N 124.17194°W
Dahadinni River	63.98472°N 124.37399°W
Saline River	64.29422°N 124.49947°W
Redstone River	64.28701°N 124.55492°W
Keele River	64.41662°N 124.80005°W
Great Bear River	64.90671°N 125.60034°W
Little Bear River	64.91581°N 125.90435°W
Carcajou River	65.62446°N 128.71682°W
Mountain River	65.67409°N 128.83856°W
Donnelly River	65.82613°N 128.84869°W
Tsintu River	66.13182°N 129.04099°W
Hare Indian River	66.29391°N 128.62381°W
Loon River	66.46969°N 128.97091°W
Tieda River	66.62877°N 129.32616°W
Gillis River	66.72907°N 129.79042°W
Gossage River	66.99237°N 130.26712°W
Thunder River	67.47803°N 130.90673°W
Tree River	67.25315°N 132.57030°W
Rabbit Hay River	67.22483°N 132.76102°W
Arctic Red River	67.44700°N 133.74743°W
Peel River	67.69665°N 134.53102°W
Rengleng River	67.80485°N 134.07145°W

== See also ==
- List of rivers of Canada
- List of rivers of the Northwest Territories
- Peace River Country
- Steamboats of the Mackenzie River
- Peel Watershed

== Works cited ==
- Hodgins, Bruce W.; Hoyle, Gwyneth (1994). Canoeing north into the unknown: a record of river travel, 1874 to 1974. Dundurn Press. ISBN 978-0-920474-93-8.
- Pielou, E.C. (1991). After the Ice Age: The Return of Life to Glaciated North America. University of Chicago Press. ISBN 978-0-226-66812-3.
