= The Ramparts (Mackenzie River) =

Coordinates: 66.226°N 128.819°W

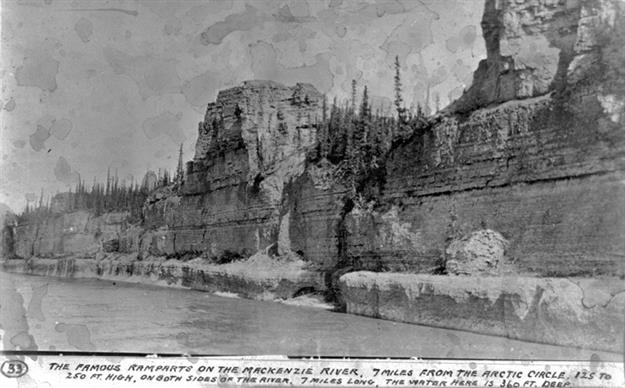

The Ramparts is a 12-kilometre (7.5 mi) canyon on Canada's Mackenzie River, in the Northwest Territories. The river narrows from almost 2 kilometres (6,600 ft) wide to barely more than 100 metres (330 ft) running between limestone walls 80 meters high.

Just upstream (south) of the canyon lies the Rampart Rapids, a significant navigational impediment and potentially dangerous to paddlers.

The river's only other rapids, the Sans Sault Rapids, are found 56 kilometres (35 mi) upstream. According to the 1968 Great Slave Lake and Mackenzie River Pilot, the rapids lie between mile 672 and 682.

Early explorers for the North West Company reported that Stone Age "eskimo" were known to have ascended the river as far as The Ramparts, in search of flint, to make stone tools.

A scholarly study on climate change discussed how it had led to reduced water levels, which were, in turn affecting navigation. Water levels in the shipping channel in The Ramparts sometimes falls below 1.2 metres (3.9 ft)—too shallow for the tugboats used for water transport on the river.
