= Keele River =

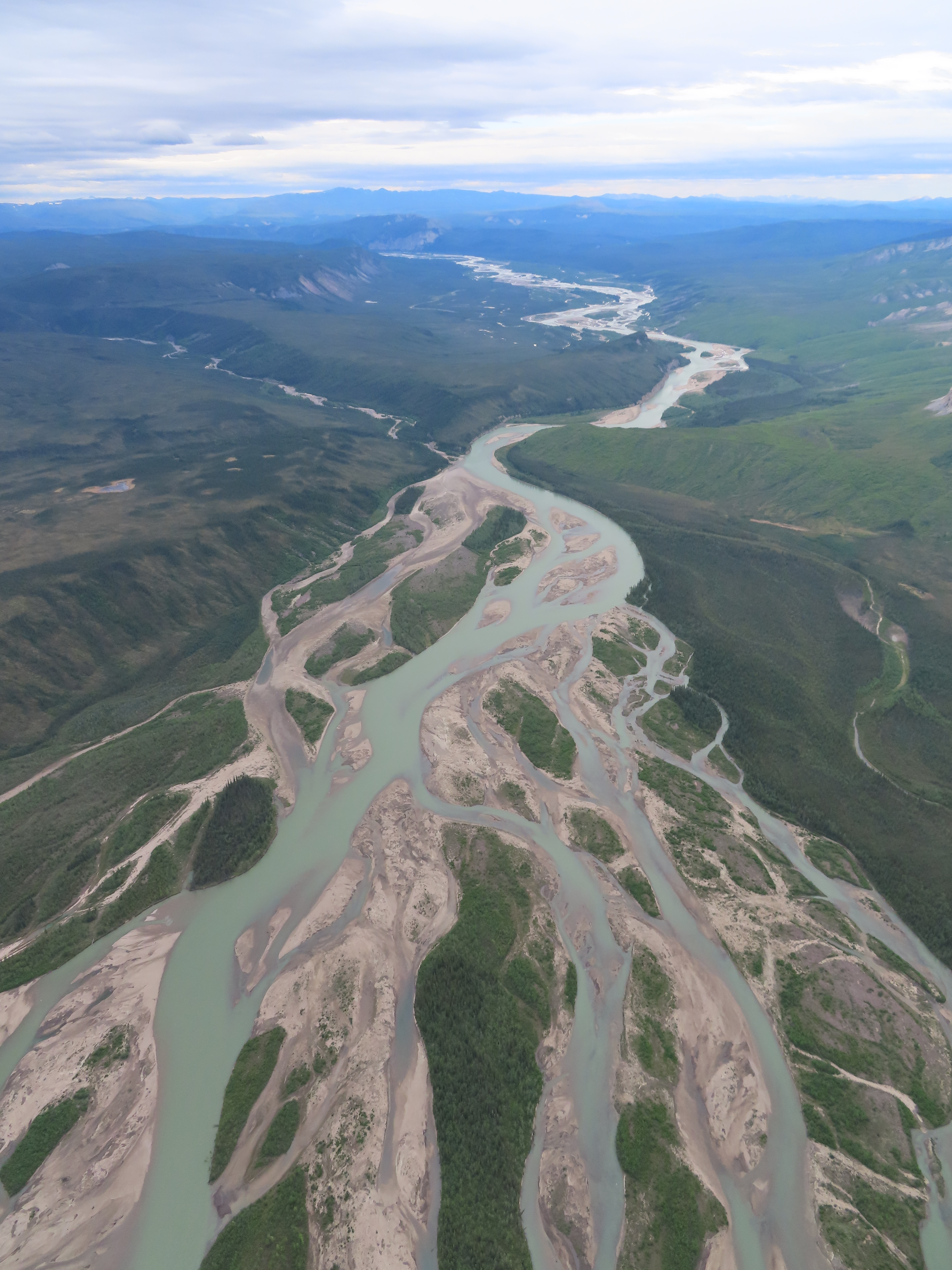
- Braided channel above Summit Creek

Location
- Country: Canada
- Territory: Northwest Territories

Physical characteristics
- Source
  - location: Selwyn Mountains
  - elevation: 1,401 m (4,596 ft)
- Mouth
  - location: Mackenzie River
  - coordinates: 64°25′N 124°48′W
  - elevation: 121 m (397 ft)
- Length: 410 km (250 mi)
- Basin size: 19,000 km^{2} (7,300 sq mi)
- Discharge
  - location: Above Twitya River
  - average: 115.7 m^{3}/s (4,090 cu ft/s)
  - minimum: 20 m^{3}/s (710 cu ft/s)
  - maximum: 550 m^{3}/s (19,000 cu ft/s)

Basin features
- Progression: Southwest-northeast
- Tributaries
  - left: Tsichu River, Intga River, Ekwi River, Twitya River, Summit Creek
  - right: Sekwi Brook, Natla River, Dorkan Creek, Nidhe Brook, Naintin Brook, Toochingkla River, Moose Nest Creek, Red Dog Creek, Middle Creek

The Keele River is a tributary of the Mackenzie River, about 410 kilometres (250 mi) long, in the western part of the Canadian Northwest Territories. Flowing in a generally northeast direction, it drains a sparsely populated, rugged area of the Mackenzie Mountains.

== Course ==
The Keele River originates in a small, unnamed lake near the border of the Northwest Territories and the Yukon, approximately 25 kilometres (16 mi) south of Macmillan Pass, which is the terminus of the drivable section of the North CANOL Road. The river begins its journey by flowing northwest through the alpine tundra area known as the Mackenzie Mountain Barrens, joining the Tsichu and Intga Rivers along the way. It then drops off the alpine plateau and begins its long descent to the Mackenzie River, tumbling gradually down into the dramatic Backbone Ranges of the Mackenzie Mountains. Approximately 100 kilometres (62 mi) from the Keele's source, the Natla River rushes into the Keele from the south and almost doubles the flow and size of the river. From the Natla Confluence, The Keele turns and snakes its way northward for 85 kilometres (53 mi) until it meets the Twitya River, its largest tributary, flowing in from the west. Just after the Twitya confluence, the Keele is deflected east around the Tigonankweine Range by the towering Mount Eduni Massif and continues in this direction until reaching the Mackenzie River. During this section, the Toochingkla River flows in from the south, before the Keele cuts between the spectacular Canyon and Redstone Ranges. It then leaves the mountains behind, becoming slow and braided, and receives Middle Creek from the south, merging into the Mackenzie some 13 kilometres (8.1 mi) downstream from the Redstone River and 50 kilometres (31 mi) south-southeast of Tulita.

== History ==
People have inhabited the mountainous area surrounding the Keele River for at least 11,000 years. The Dene name for the Keele River is Begádeé, which translates to "Winding River". The river was used extensively as a trade route for some tribes of the Mountain Dene people. After spending the summer hunting and trading along the Yukon/NWT border the Mountain Dene, or shúhtagot'ıne, would build large moose skin boats, fill them with furs and goods and paddle down the Keele River to their winter camps along the Mackenzie River Valley. There they would trade these furs and goods for supplies to survive the long winter months with the Lowland Dene People and the Hudson Bay trading post after it was built at Fort Norman in the 1800s. Come spring, they would return to the mountains once again on foot. After signing Treaty 11 (regarding the transfer of lands in the Yukon to the federal government for purposes of oil exploration) with King George V in 1921, the Dene no longer went to the Yukon Border area as frequently and as a result the Keele was also less travelled. The Keele also has been known as the Gravel River.

The river was named, as was the Keele Peak, for Joseph Keele, a member of the Geological Survey of Canada, who had surveyed the area in 1907–08, and descended the Keele River from its source to the Mackenzie.

== Recreation ==
In recent years the Keele River, the less travelled cousin of the South Nahanni River, has become a popular destination for wilderness canoeing and rafting. This is due to a combination of surrounding mountain sceneries and multiple class 2+ whitewater rivers with no portages. Several outfitting and guiding companies offer guided tours down the Natla/Keele river system during all months of the summer. Trips usually depart Norman Wells or Fort Simpson by floatplane and land on the river at the Natla-Keele confluence, with trips usually lasting between 10 and 14 days. The upper Keele River above the confluence with the Natla is also a class 2-3 navigable waterway, but suffers from accessibility issues, as there are no lakes for a float plane to land on at the headwaters of the river. Paddlers looking to go down this section usually access the Keele through the class 3-4 Tischu River after landing on an air strip at Mile 222 of the Canol Road.

== In literature ==
- James A. Michener describes a group of pioneers wintering on the edges of the river in the winter of 1897-1898 in his novel Journey (1989)

== See also ==
- List of rivers of the Northwest Territories
