= Franklin Mountains (Northwest Territories) =

Mountain range of the Northwest Territories, Canada

The Franklin Mountains (64°15′00″N 124°00′06″W) of the Northwest Territories are a range of low peaks that stretch along the east bank of the Mackenzie River from 64 to 66 degrees of latitude.
