= Lemeza =

Lemeza Лемеза
- Village
- Location within Bashkortostan Location within Russia
- Coordinates: 54°55′N 57°04′E
- Country: Russia
- Region: Bashkortostan
- District: Iglinsky District
- Time zone: UTC+5:00

Lemeza (Russian: Лемеза; Bashkir: Ләмәҙе, Lämäźe) is a rural locality (a village) in Ulu-Telyaksky Selsoviet, Iglinsky District, Bashkortostan, Russia. The population was 24 as of 2010. There is 1 street.

== Geography ==
Lemeza is located 27 km east of Iglino (the district's administrative centre) by road.
