= Arctic Red River =

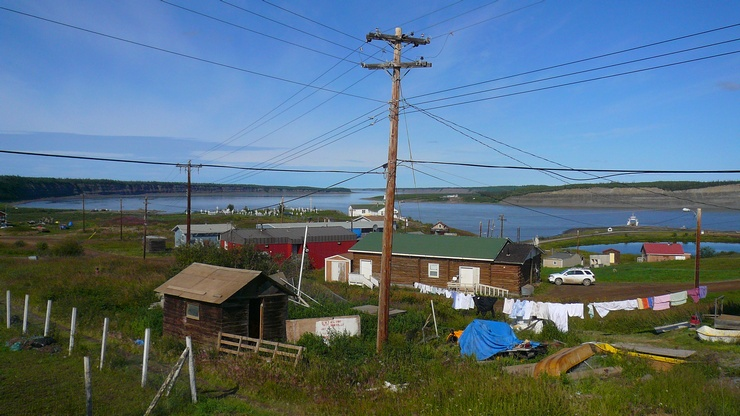
- Confluence of Red Arctic River and Mackenzie, Tsigatchic, NWT

- Location of mouth

Location
- Country: Canada
- Province: Northwest Territories

Physical characteristics
- Mouth
  - coordinates: 67°26′49″N 133°44′53″W
- Length: 500 km (310 mi)

Basin features
- River system: Mackenzie River

The Arctic Red River is a tributary to the Mackenzie River in the Northwest Territories, Canada. In 1993 the river was designated as part of the Canadian Heritage Rivers System. It was also the name of a community on the Mackenzie where the river joins, now known as Tsiigehtchic. The Dempster Highway crosses the Mackenzie at this point.

The Arctic Red River's headwaters are in the Mackenzie Mountains, from where it flows 500 km (310 mi) northwest to its confluence with the Mackenzie. The river flows through a deep canyon as it flows through the Peel Plateau. The Gwichʼin name for the river, Tsiigèhnjik, translates as iron river. The lower 200 km (120 mi) of the river are navigable by kayakers and canoers, without requiring portaging.

Measured at a gauge about 90 km (56 mi) from the mouth, the average flow between 1968 and 2011 was 158 m^{3}/s (5,600 cu ft/s). The highest recorded discharge was 3,000 m^{3}/s (110,000 cu ft/s) in May 1991. The minimum flow was 9.32 m^{3}/s (329 cu ft/s) in December 1973.

== See also ==
- List of rivers of the Northwest Territories
