= Redstone River (Mackenzie) =

Location
- Country: Canada
- Territory: Northwest Territories

Physical characteristics
- Source
  - location: Redstone Plateau
  - elevation: 1,068 m (3,504 ft)
- Mouth
  - location: Mackenzie River
  - coordinates: 64°17′10″N 124°32′40″W
  - elevation: 133 m (436 ft)
- Length: 289 km (180 mi)
- Basin size: 16,400 km^{2} (6,300 sq mi)
- Discharge
  - average: 174 m^{3}/s (6,100 cu ft/s)
  - minimum: 10 m^{3}/s (350 cu ft/s)
  - maximum: 3,750 m^{3}/s (132,000 cu ft/s)

Basin features
- Progression: Southwest-northeast
- Tributaries
  - left: Moose Horn River, Parallel Creek
  - right: Ravens Throat River

The Redstone River is a large river in the Northwest Territories of Canada. It is about 289 kilometres (180 mi) long. It is a tributary of the Mackenzie River, joining it on the left bank some 100 kilometres (62 mi) north of Wrigley. Draining a rugged and high area of the Mackenzie Mountains, the Redstone watershed is sparsely populated by people but remains an ecological haven for wildlife including moose, caribou, wolves Dall's Sheep and Bears. It is a pristine mountain wilderness.

== Course ==
It begins in several ponds on Rockslide Pass south of the Redstone Plateau deep within the Mackenzie Mountains, at an elevation of 1,068 metres (3,504 ft). The river initially flows northwest, turning west where the Moose Horn River enters from the left. It makes a bend to the north, turning south near Wrigley Lake, and receives its larger tributary, the Ravens Throat River, as it cuts through the Redstone Range. The Redstone turns north, bending west around the Silvan Plateau, leaving its canyon and spreading onto the plains surrounding the Mackenzie River, which it joins about 40 kilometres (25 mi) after that point, at just 133 metres (436 ft) above sea level, 13 kilometres (8 mi) upstream from the Keele River.

== Watershed ==
The Redstone's watershed encompasses an area of roughly 16,400 km^{2} (6,300 sq mi). Its average annual discharge, measured at a gauge 63 km (39 mi) above the mouth from 1974 to 2000, was 174.25 cubic metres per second (6,154 cu ft/s). The highest monthly flows occurred in July at 472.70 cubic metres per second (16,693 cu ft/s), and the lowest was 17.91 cubic metres per second (632 cu ft/s) in March, because of its dependence on glacier and snow melt in the brief Arctic summer. The highest recorded flow was 899 cubic metres per second (31,700 cu ft/s) in July 1991, and the lowest was 10.7 cubic metres per second (380 cu ft/s) in February 1975. Its tributary, the Ravensthroat River, has the distinction of being significantly larger than the Redstone at their confluence. Older maps referred to these rivers as the North and South Redstone respectively.

== Recreation ==
Recently, both the Redstone and Ravensthroat Rivers have proven to be challenging and rewarding multiday canoe/rafting expeditions, with many class 2 and 3 rapids and canyons in a remote montane wilderness setting. The first modern descent of the Redstone was in the year 2000 via the Raven's Throat tributary by a National Geographic Explorers League group. Outfitters from the NWT and BC have since run guided trips down the rivers flying with a float plane into either Wrigley Lake for the Redstone or Divide Lake for the Raven's Throat (helicopter support required). The river and its tributaries offers a different experience compared to the other Mackenzie Mountain rivers as it cuts through a unique geological area known as the Redstone Plateau. Trips usually last between 10–16 days long depending on the route, and finish in the communities of Tulita or Norman Wells on the Mackenzie River.

== See also ==
- List of rivers of the Northwest Territories
