= North Nahanni River =

River in Northwest Territories, Canada

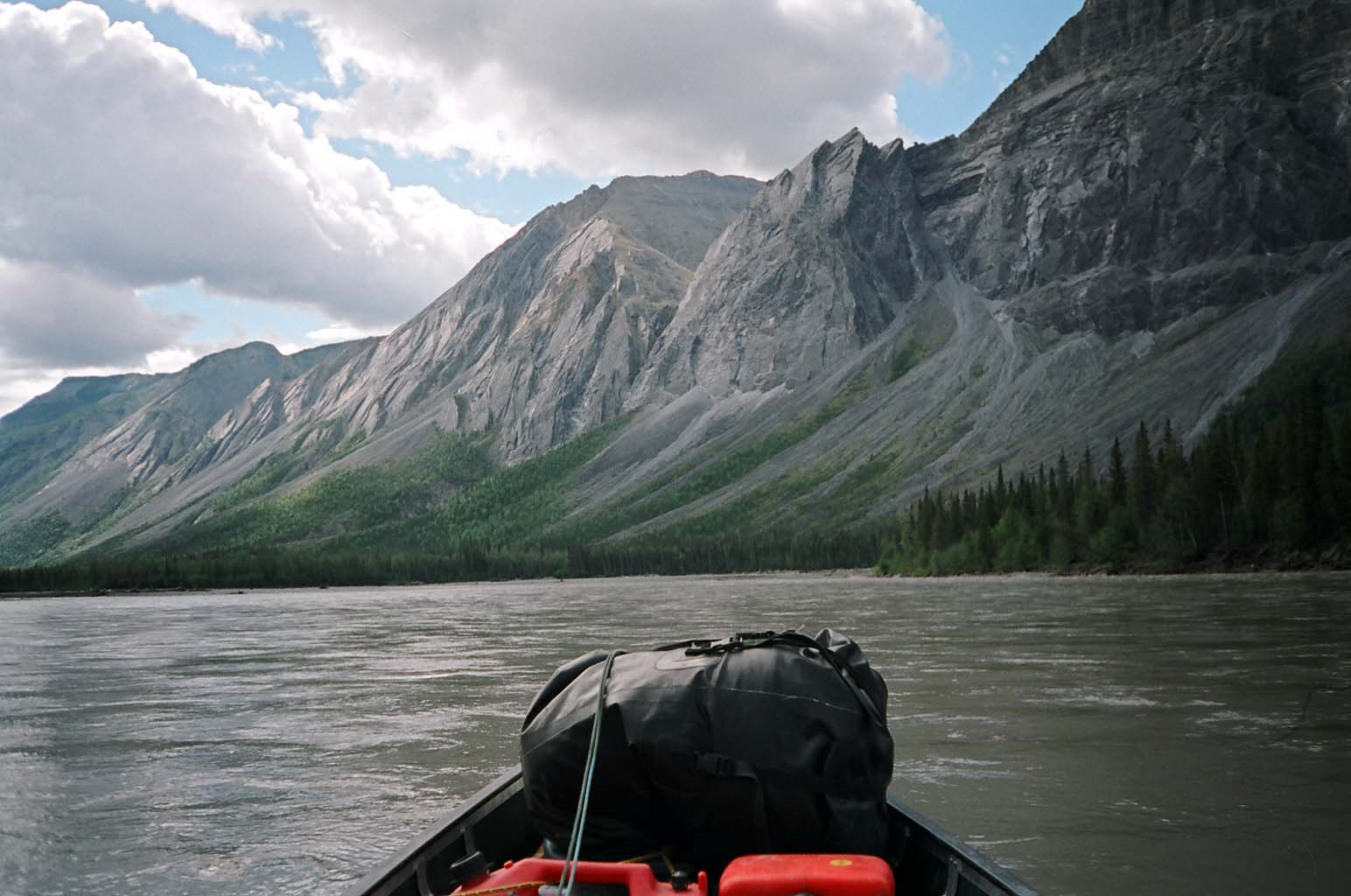

Location
- Country: Canada
- Territory: Northwest Territories

Physical characteristics
- Source
  - location: Backbone Ranges
  - coordinates: 62°16′18″N 126°23′55″W
  - elevation: 2,000 meters (6,600 ft)
- Mouth
  - location: Mackenzie River
  - coordinates: 62°15′07″N 123°19′42″W
  - elevation: 105 meters (344 ft)

North Nahanni River is a river in the Northwest Territories of Canada. It is a major tributary of the Mackenzie River.

== Course ==
The North Nahanni River originates in the Backbone Ranges of the Mackenzie Mountains, at an elevation of 2,000 meters (6,600 ft). It flows east, south of the Thundercloud Range, then turns north-east and east. It turns south around the Camsell Range of the Franklin Mountains, where it receives the waters of Deceiver Creek and Battlement Creek. It turns east after receiving the Ram River and Tetcela River and flows between the Nahanni Range and the Camsell Range. It empties into the Mackenzie River at an elevation of 105 meters (344 ft), 110 kilometers (68 mi) downstream from Fort Simpson.

== Tributaries ==
From headwaters to mouth, the North Nahanni River receives waters from the following tributaries:

- Deceiver Creek
- Battlement Creek
- Ram River
- Tetcela River

== See also ==
- List of rivers of the Northwest Territories
