= Mountain River (Northwest Territories) =

Location
- Country: Canada
- Territory: Northwest Territories

Physical characteristics
- Source: Mackenzie Mountains
  - location: Northwest Territories, close to watershed border with Yukon
  - coordinates: 64°04′53″N 130°47′14″W
  - elevation: 1,738 m (5,702 ft)
- Mouth: Mackenzie River
  - location: between Norman Wells and Fort Good Hope, Northwest Territories
  - coordinates: 65°41′00″N 128°50′07″W
  - elevation: 70 m (230 ft)

The Mountain River is a tributary of the Mackenzie River in Canada's Northwest Territories. Its source is in the Mackenzie Mountains close to the watershed border with Yukon. It flows eastward, joining the Mackenzie River just south of the Arctic Circle. The river flows about 370 km (230 mi), dropping over 1,200 m (3,900 ft) over its course, with large volume rapids, fast current, and six canyons. The upper half of the river is surrounded by mountains which reach heights of over 2,700 m (8,900 ft), with rock colours of buff, grey, cinnamon, green, and maroon. Wildlife includes caribou, moose, wolf, Dall sheep, grizzly bear, and black bear. It is considered an excellent but difficult wilderness canoeing river.

== See also ==
- List of rivers of the Northwest Territories
