= Snezhnaya =

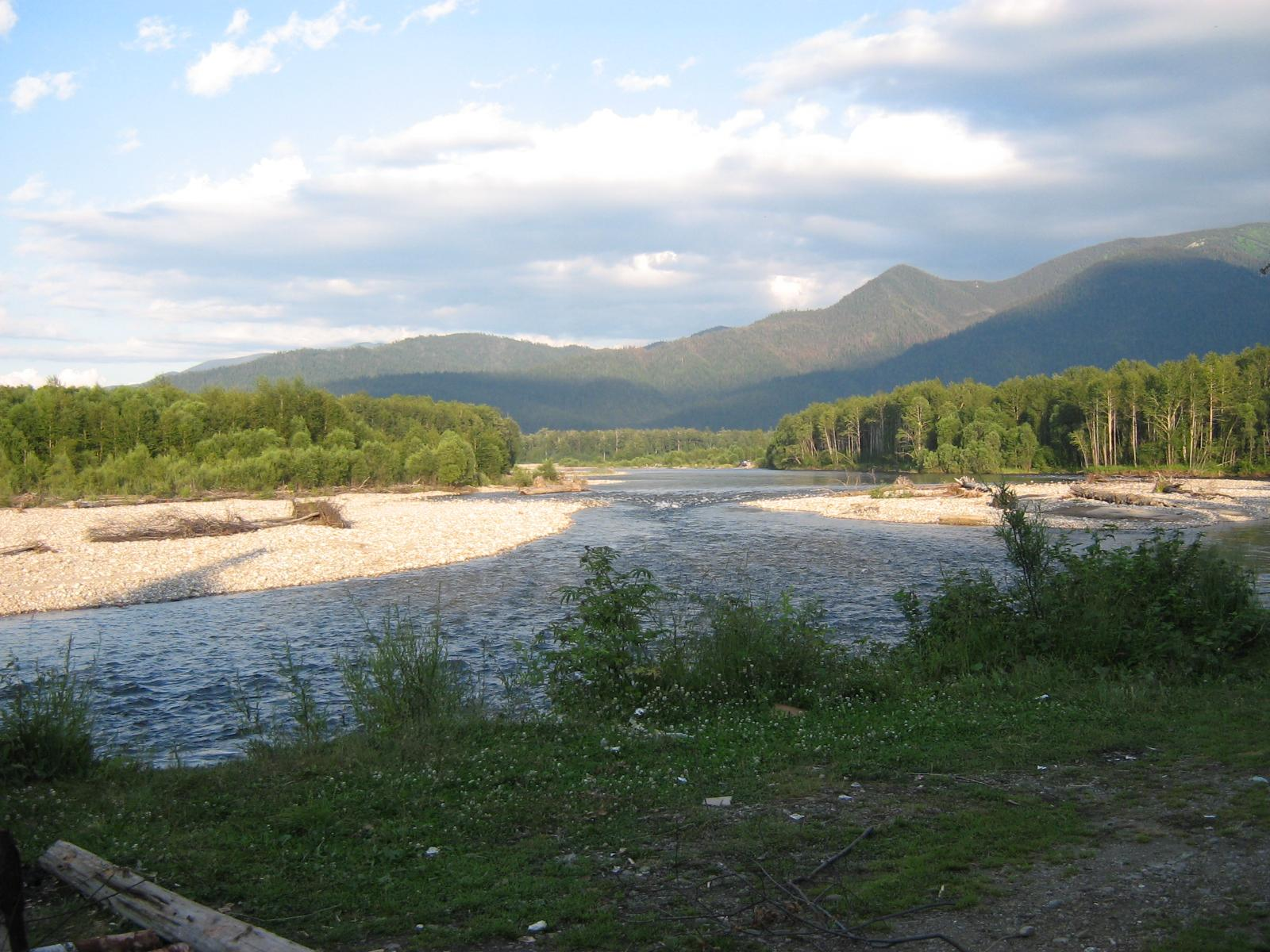
- View of the river

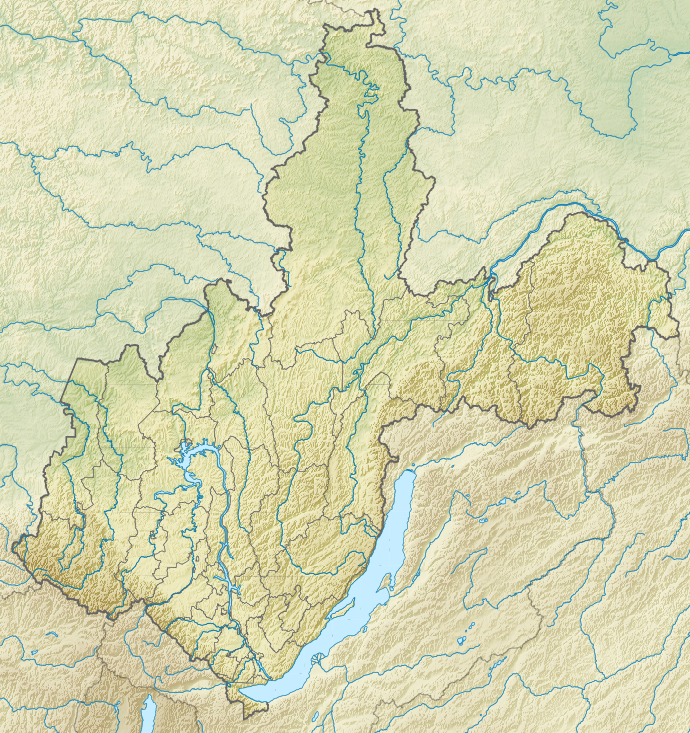
- Mouth location in Irkutsk Oblast, Russia

Location
- Country: Russia

Physical characteristics
- Source: Khamar-Daban mountains
  - coordinates: 51°04′36″N 103°17′32″E
- Mouth: Lake Baikal
  - coordinates: 51.4757°N 104.6245°E
- Length: 173 km (107 mi)
- Basin size: 3,020 km^{2} (1,170 sq mi)

Basin features
- Progression: Lake Baikal→ Angara→ Yenisey→ Kara Sea

The Snezhnaya (Russian: Снежная, lit. 'Snowy') is a river in Buryatia and Irkutsk Oblast, Siberia, Russia.

== Course ==
It is one of the main tributaries that feed into Lake Baikal. It is named after the primary source of its water: snowmelt. The river starts in the Khamar-Daban mountains, where melting snow and rainfall during warm weather flow into the river and run down the mountain. It is 173 kilometres (107 mi) long, and has a drainage basin of 3,020 square kilometres (1,170 sq mi).

== See also ==
- List of rivers of Russia
