= Aksu =

Aksu or Aqsu (Turkic: "white water") may refer to:

== People ==
- Aksu Hanttu (born 1979), Finnish musician, record producer and sound engineer
- Aksu (surname)

== Places ==
=== Armenia ===
- Akhsu, Armenia

=== Azerbaijan ===
- Agsu Rayon, a district of Azerbaijan
  - Agsu (city), a city in the district
    - Ağsu FK, a football club based in the city

=== China ===
- Aksu Prefecture, a prefecture in Xinjiang Uyghur Autonomous Region of China
  - Aksu, Xinjiang, the capital of Aksu Prefecture

=== Iran ===
- Aqsu, Ardabil, a village in Ardabil Province
- Aq Su Rural District, an administrative subdivision of Golestan Province

=== Kazakhstan ===
- Aksu, Pavlodar Region, a city in Pavlodar Region, Kazakhstan
- Aksu City Administration, an administrative division in Pavlodar Region, Kazakhstan
- Aksu, Almaty, a village in Almaty Region, Kazakhstan
- Aksu-Ayuly, district capital of Shet District, Karaganda Region, Kazakhstan
- Aksu District, Almaty Region, a district of Almaty Region
- Aksu Canyon, a canyon in the Tian Shan mountain range

=== Kyrgyzstan ===
- See Ak-Suu (disambiguation)

=== Turkey ===
- Aksu, Antalya, a municipal town in southwestern Turkey, in the district and province of Antalya
- Aksu, Araç, a village in Kastamonu Province
- Aksu, Çelikhan, a village in Çelikhan district, Adıyaman Province
- Aksu, Giresun, a village in Dereli district of Giresun Province
- Aksu, Gölyaka, a village in Düzce Province
- Aksu, Hasankeyf, a village in Hasankeyf district, Batman Province
- Aksu, Isparta, a town in southwestern Turkey, in the district of Isparta
- Aksu, Burdur, a village in Burdur Province
- Aksu, İspir, a neighbourhood in Erzurum Province
- Aksu, Kestel, a neighbourhood in Bursa Province
- Aksu, Nallıhan, a village in Nallıhan district, Ankara Province
- Aksu, Nazilli, a village in Nazilli district, Aydın Province
- Aksu, Silopi, a village in Silopi District, Şırnak Province
- Aksu, Sincik, a village in Sincik district, Adıyaman Province

== Waterways ==
- Aksu River (disambiguation)
- Aksu Dam, an embankment dam near on the Çoruh River in Erzurum Province, Turkey

== Other uses ==
- 2010 Aksu bombing, a bombing incident in Aksu, Xinjiang, China
- Aksu Airport, an airport serving Aksu, a city in Xinjiang, China
- Aksu-Djabagly Nature Reserve, a nature reserve in Kazakhstan
- AK-74SU, a Russian assault rifle
- Battle of Aksu (717), a battle of the Muslim conquest of Transoxiana
- Battle of Aksu (1933), a minor battle in Aksu, Xinjiang, China
- G3014 Kuytun–Aksu Expressway, a planned expressway in Central Asia
- Aksu pattern, a motif found in tribal weavings especially those originating in northwestern Iran and Turkmenistan

== See also ==
- Whitewater (disambiguation)
