= Agua Blanca =

Agua Blanca (Spanish: "White Water") may refer to several geographical locations:

== In Mexico ==
- Agua Blanca, Coahuila
- Agua Blanca de Iturbide, Hidalgo
- Agua Blanca, Jalisco
- Agua Blanca, Oaxaca
- Agua Blanca, Sonora

== Other places ==
- Agua Blanca (La Rioja), Argentina
- Agua Blanca, Ecuador
- Agua Blanca, Jutiapa, Guatemala
- Agua Blanca District, El Dorado Province, San Martín Region, Peru
- Agua Blanca (Ibiza), Spain
- Agua Blanca, Portuguesa, municipality in Venezuela

== See also ==
- Aguas Blancas (disambiguation)
- Whitewater (disambiguation)
