= Whitewater (disambiguation) =

Whitewater is turbulent, frothy, moving water.

Whitewater or White water may also refer to:

== Places ==
=== United States ===
- Whitewater, California
- Whitewater, Colorado
- Whitewater, Indiana
- Whitewater, Kansas
- Whitewater, Missouri
- Whitewater, Montana
- White Water, Oklahoma
- Whitewater, Wisconsin
  - Whitewater (town), Wisconsin
- Whitewater Canal, Indiana
- Whitewater Glacier, Oregon
- Whitewater Shaker Settlement, Ohio
- Whitewater Township (disambiguation)

=== Elsewhere ===
- Whitewater, Guyana
- Whitewater Ski Resort, British Columbia, Canada

== Parks and recreation ==
- Six Flags White Water, a water park in Cobb County, Georgia, U.S.
- White Water Branson, a water park in Branson, Missouri, U.S.
- Whitewater State Park, Minnesota, U.S.
- Whitewater Memorial State Park, Indiana, U.S.

== Other uses ==
- White Water (pinball), a 1992 pinball machine
- Whitewater (POW camp), a former labour camp in Manitoba, Canada
- Whitewater Brewery, in Northern Ireland
- Gold Rush: White Water, a 2018 TV series
- Whitewater controversy, a 1990s political controversy in the United States of America

== See also ==
- White Water Bay (disambiguation)
- Wild Water (disambiguation)
- White (disambiguation)
- Water (disambiguation)
- Rapid (disambiguation)
- Agua Blanca (disambiguation) ('white water')
- Aksu (disambiguation) ('white water')
- List of whitewater rivers
- U.S. National Whitewater Center, in Charlotte, North Carolina
- Whitewater Canyon (disambiguation)
- Whitewater controversy, involving the Whitewater Development Corporation
- Whitewater rafting
- Whitewater recreation in British Columbia, Canada
- Whitewater Valley Railroad, a scenic historic railroad in southeastern Indiana
- WhiteWater West, a water slide manufacturing company based in Canada
- WhiteWater World, a water park on the Gold Coast, Australia
