= Aguas Blancas =

Aguas Blancas (Spanish: "white waters") may refer to:

- Aguas Blancas, Salta, a town on Argentina's border with Bolivia, in Salta province
- Aguas Blancas, Yauco, Puerto Rico, a barrio
- Aguas Blancas (Lavalleja), a village near Lavalleja, Uruguay
  - Aguas Blancas Dam, a dam near the village
- Aguas Blancas, Guerrero, in the southern Mexican state of Guerrero
  - Aguas Blancas massacre, which took place there in June 1995

Similar names

- Agua Blanca (disambiguation)
