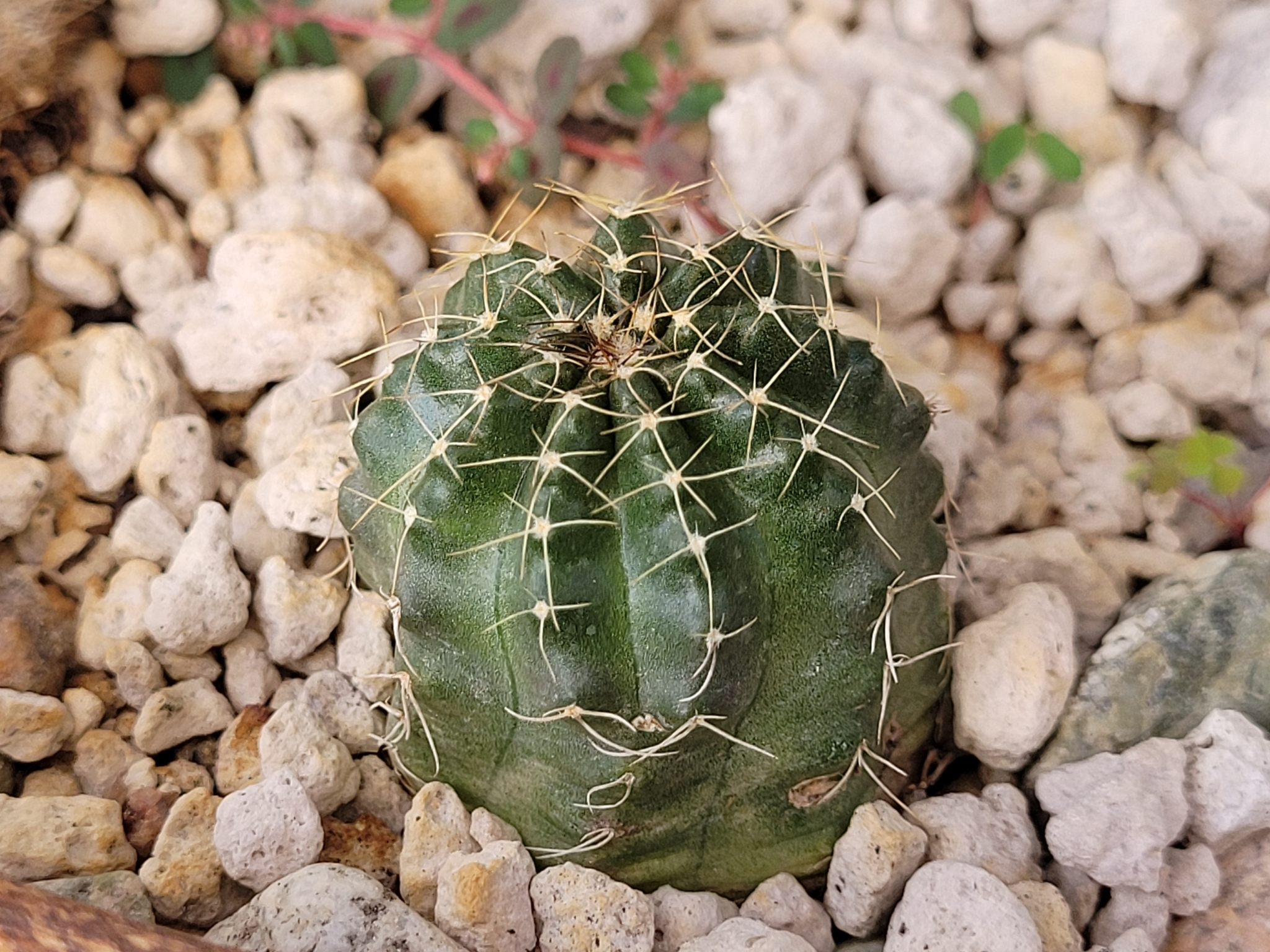

Conservation status
- Critically Endangered (IUCN 3.1)

Scientific classification
- Kingdom: Plantae
- Clade: Tracheophytes
- Clade: Angiosperms
- Clade: Eudicots
- Order: Caryophyllales
- Family: Cactaceae
- Subfamily: Cactoideae
- Genus: Echinocereus
- Species: E. acanthosetus

Binomial name
- Echinocereus acanthosetus (S.Arias & U.Guzmán) Gómez-Quint. & Dan.Sánchez 2020

Synonyms
- Echinocereus pulchellus var. acanthosetus S.Arias & U.Guzmán 1997; Echinocereus pulchellus subsp. acanthosetus (S.Arias & U.Guzmán) W.Blum 1998

= Echinocereus acanthosetus =

Species of cactus

Echinocereus acanthosetus is a species of cactus native to Mexico.

== Description ==
Echinocereus acanthosetus grows solitary almost spherical to spherical, green to stems reach height of 3.9 to 6.2 mm (0.15 to 0.24 in) a diameter of 12.1 to 25.5 mm (0.48 to 1.00 in). There are eight to ten low and wide ribs. There are 5-9 radial spines that are 2 to 7 mm (0.079 to 0.276 in) long growing on elliptical areoles. The short, funnel-shaped flowers are magenta to cream white and appear near the tips or sides of the shoots. They are 31.6 to 48 mm (1.24 to 1.89 in) long and reach a diameter of 41.8 to 46.6 mm (1.65 to 1.83 in). The spherical, purple-colored, 7 to 9 mm (0.28 to 0.35 in) long by 5 to 7 mm (0.20 to 0.28 in) wide with black seeds.

Plants are distinguished from Echinocereus pulchellus by its smaller stems, elliptical areoles, and larger number of spines that are also longer.

== Distribution ==
Plants are found in Oaxaca, Mexico between Magdalena Jicotlan and Tepelmeme de Morelos in Valle de Tehuacán-Cuicatlá growing in grasslands and among xerophytic vegetation.

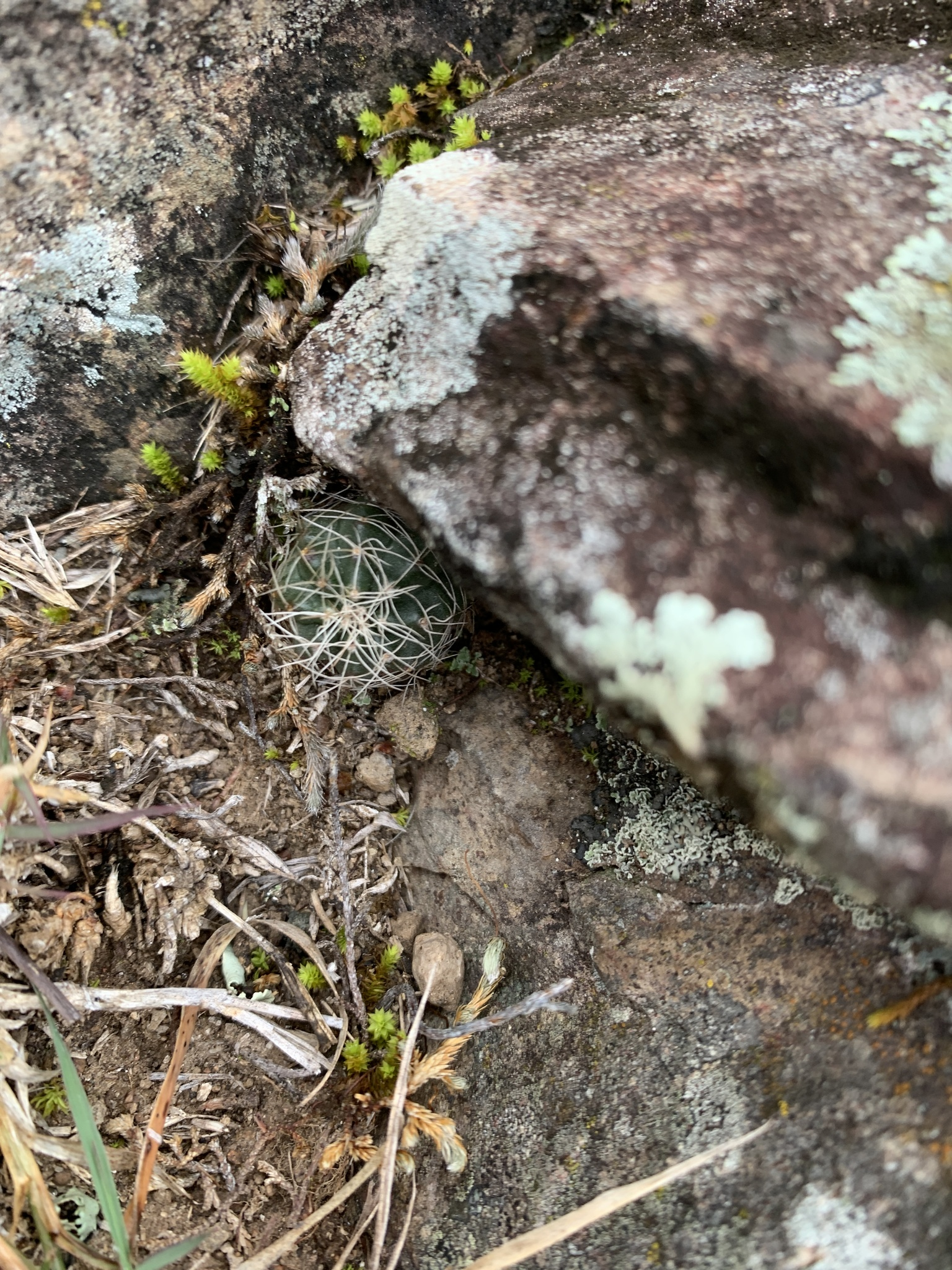
Plants growing in habitat in San Francisco Teopan, Oaxaca

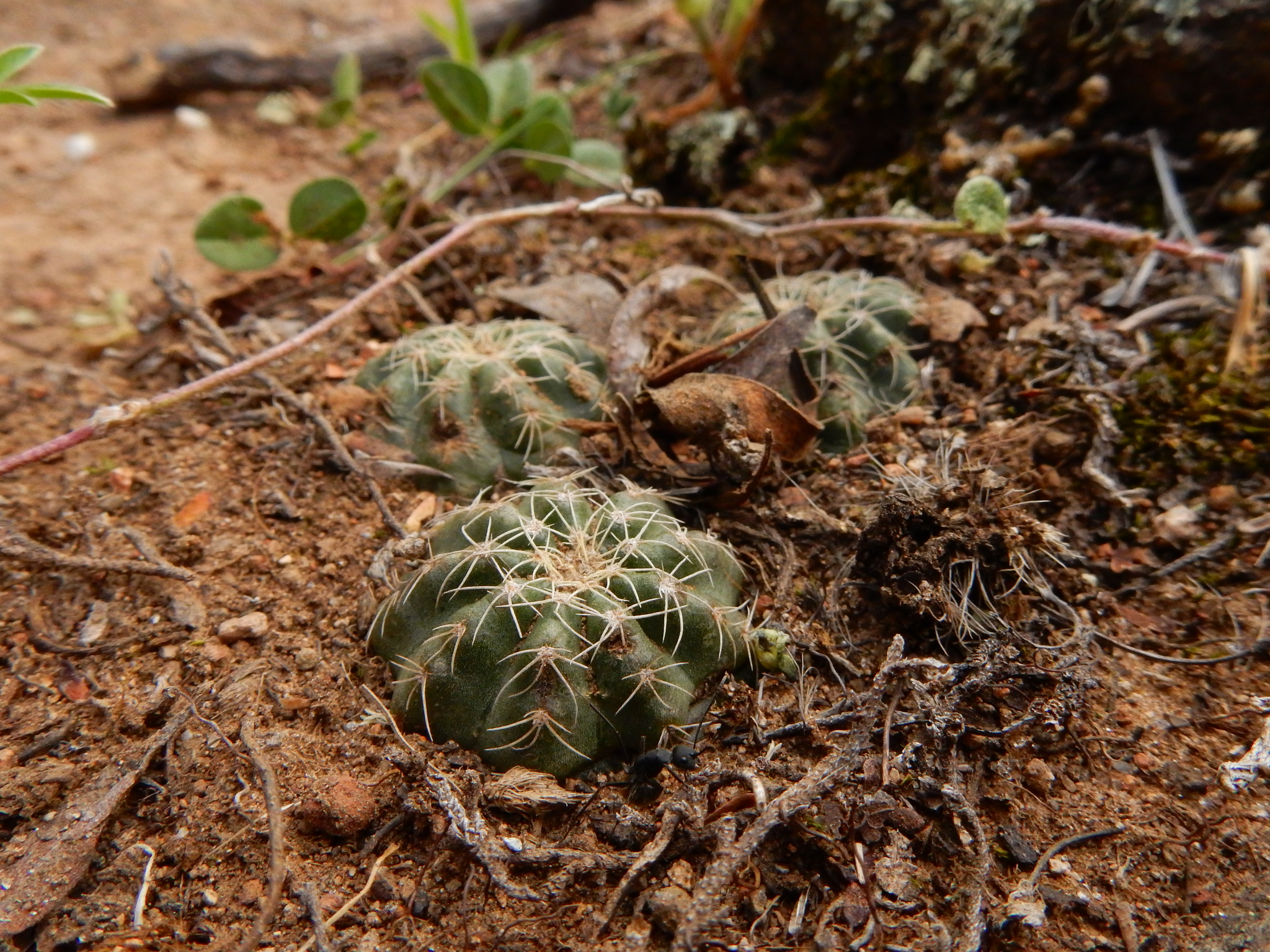
Habitat in Agua Blanca, Oaxaca

== Taxonomy ==
Echinocereus acanthosetus was first described as a variety of Echinocereus pulchellus in 1997. It was later recognized as a subspecies. It was recognized as a separate species in 2020 based on multivariate analysis.
