= Wild Water =

Wild Water, or variants, may refer to:

- Wild water or whitewater, turbulent, frothy, moving water

== Arts and entertainment ==
- Wild Water (Australian band), a reggae, rock, dub and funk band
- Wild Water (Norwegian band), a rock band
- Wild Water (film), 1962 Austro-German film
- Wild Waters, a novel in the Pirates of the Caribbean: Legends of the Brethren Court children's novel series

== Sports and recreation ==
- Wild Waters, a former water park in Silver Springs, Florida, U.S.
- Wild Island, known previously as Wild Waters, a water park in Sparks, Nevada, U.S.

== See also ==
- Wildwater Kingdom (disambiguation)
- Whitewater (disambiguation)
- Rapid (disambiguation)
- Wild water buffalo (Bubalus arnee)
- Wildwater canoeing
- Whitewater rafting
