= Whitewater Township, Missouri =

Whitewater Township, Missouri may refer to the following townships:

- Whitewater Township, Bollinger County, Missouri
- Whitewater Township, Cape Girardeau County, Missouri

== See also ==
- Whitewater Township (disambiguation)
