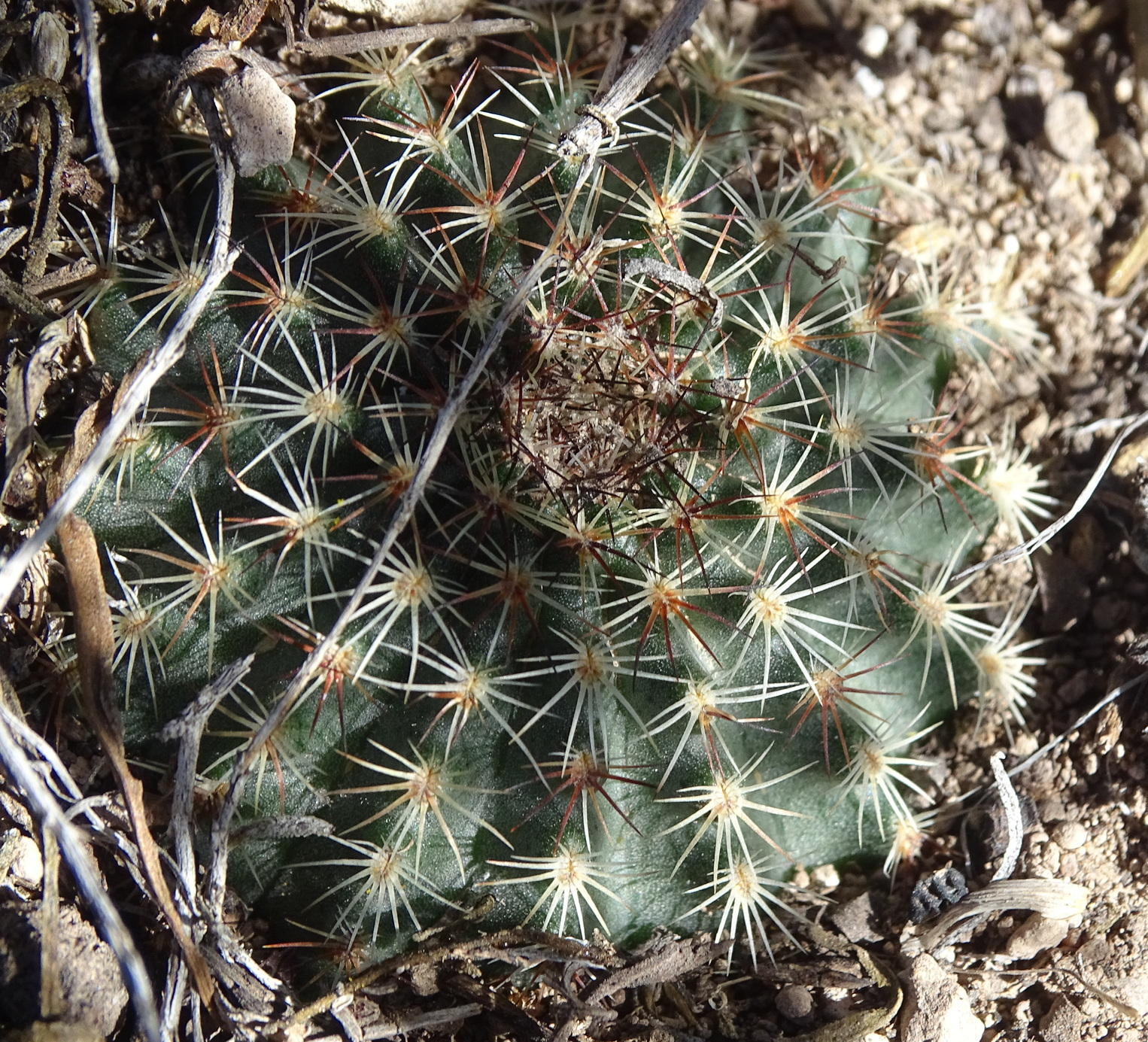

Conservation status
- Endangered (IUCN 3.1)

Scientific classification
- Kingdom: Plantae
- Clade: Tracheophytes
- Clade: Angiosperms
- Clade: Eudicots
- Order: Caryophyllales
- Family: Cactaceae
- Subfamily: Cactoideae
- Genus: Echinocereus
- Species: E. sharpii

Binomial name
- Echinocereus sharpii (N.P.Taylor) Dan.Sánchez & Gómez-Quint. 2020

Synonyms
- Echinocereus pulchellus var. sharpii N.P.Taylor 1989; Echinocereus pulchellus subsp. sharpii (N.P.Taylor) N.P.Taylor 1997

= Echinocereus sharpii =

Species of cactus

Echinocereus sharpii is a species of cactus native to Mexico.

== Description ==
Echinocereus sharpii grows solitary almost spherical to spherical, green to stems reach height of 6.1 to 31 mm (0.24 to 1.22 in) a diameter of 18.2 to 40.5 mm (0.72 to 1.59 in). There are twelve to eighteen ribs with elliptic areoles. There are 9-13 radial spines that are 1.5 to 5 mm (0.059 to 0.197 in) long that are white to brown. The short, funnel-shaped flowers are pale pink to cream white with a purple stripe on the center of the petals and sepals, flower bloom from the tips or sides of the shoots. They are 29.2 to 41.7 mm (1.15 to 1.64 in) long and reach a diameter of 35.7 to 55.5 mm (1.41 to 2.19 in). The spherical, purple-colored, 10 to 12 mm (0.39 to 0.47 in) long by 10 to 117 mm (0.39 to 4.61 in) wide with black seeds.

Plants are distinguished from Echinocereus pulchellus by its numerous ribs and spines and its cream white flowers.

== Distribution ==
Plants are found growing in limestone soil in the grasslands of Nuevo Leon and Cohuila, Mexico at elevations around 1,900 meters.

== Taxonomy ==
This species was first described by Nigel Paul Taylor in 1989 as a subspecies of Echinocereus pulchellus from a plant collected in Rancho San Gerardo, Nuevo León. It was recognized as a separate species in 2020 based on multivariate analysis.
