= Rapid Creek =

Rapid Creek may refer to:

- Rapid Creek (Iowa River), a river in Iowa
- Rapid Creek (South Dakota), a tributary of the Cheyenne River in the United States
- Rapid Creek, Northern Territory in Australia
