= OC-1 =

OC-1 may refer to:

- OC-1, a class of specifications for SONET optical fiber in telecommunications
- The pseudonym of a US official who shot Guantanamo captive Omar Khadr
- The class of canoe racing: outrigger canoe, one person; see Outrigger canoeing#Racing
- Solo Open Canoe for Whitewater canoeing
