= Rabid (disambiguation) =

Rabid usually refers to anything affected by or related to rabies, an infectious neurological disease.

Rabid may also refer to:

== Films ==
- Rabid (1977 film), a Canadian-American horror film
- Rabid (2019 film), a Canadian horror film, a remake of the 1977 film

== Music ==
- Rabid (band), a punk rock band from Leicester, England
- Rabid (record label), a record label founded by Martin Hannett and Tosh Ryan in Manchester in 1978

== See also ==
- Rabies (disambiguation)
- Rabit (disambiguation)
- Rapid (disambiguation)
