= Whitewater River =

Whitewater River may refer to:

- The occurrence of whitewater rapids in rivers
- Whitewater river (river type), a classification used in contrast to clear and blackwater rivers, mainly in South America

== Specific rivers in the United States ==
- Whitewater River (California)
- Whitewater River (Keowee River tributary), in North Carolina and South Carolina
- Whitewater River (Great Miami River tributary), in Indiana and Ohio
- Whitewater River (Kansas)
- Whitewater River (Minnesota)
- Whitewater River (Missouri)
- Whitewater River (Oregon)

== Specific rivers outside the United States ==
- Whitewater River (New Zealand)
- River Whitewater, a tributary in Hampshire, England

== See also ==
- List of whitewater rivers
- Whitewater (disambiguation)
- Whitewater Canyon (disambiguation)
