= Rabit =

Rabit may refer to:

- Rabit (musician), American producer of electronic music
- Ranked Ballot Initiative of Toronto (RaBIT)
- Batak Rabit, a town in Malaysia

== See also ==
- Rabbit (disambiguation)
- Rabid (disambiguation)
- Rapid (disambiguation)
- Rapi:t, a train service in Japan
- Ribat, a military fortification of the Middle East
