= Whitewater Canyon =

Whitewater Canyon or White Water Canyon may refer to:

== Geography ==
- Whitewater Canyon on the Whitewater River (California), U.S.
- Whitewater Canyon on the Whitewater Creek (New Mexico), U.S.
- Whitewater Canyon, a park in Jones County, Iowa, U.S.
- Whitewater Canyon National Forest Recreation Area, Catron County, New Mexico, U.S.

== Other ==
- White Water Canyon, a Canadian theme park ride
- White Water Canyon, a themed area at Canada's Wonderland theme park

== See also ==
- Whitewater (disambiguation)
- Whitewater River (disambiguation)
