= Aguas Blancas (Lavalleja) =

Uruguayan village

Coordinates: 34.5086°S 55.3722°W

Aguas Blancas is a small village located south of Lavalleja, Uruguay. Aguas Blancas is an area of dam located at km 91 of the Map 8, is 28 km from the provincial capital Minas. It can be accessed via Scenic Route 81. The dam was built on the waters of the Arroyo Mataojo, located in the Sierra del Abra de Zabaleta. Being a dam area is ideal for fishing and boating. It is a place visited on weekends to rest and enjoy nature. There is in place a municipal campsite with pitches, electricity, potable water, bathrooms with hot water, barbecue, washing clothes and dishes, bathing area, fishing, and boating on the lake. There are soccer and volleyball, storage, and security. In the area you can see wild goats and different types of birds. This site is located at a strategic point since you can get from Punta del Este on National Route Route 60 and Montevideo on National Route Map 8. It is near Solis Mataojo town with all the essential services. Also, the village has a buddhist temple on top of a hill.

== See also ==
- Represa de Aguas Blancas
