= Wildwater Kingdom =

Wildwater Kingdom may refer to:

- Dorney Park & Wildwater Kingdom, an amusement park/water park in Allentown, Pennsylvania
- Wildwater Kingdom (Ohio), a defunct water park in Aurora, Ohio
- Wet'n'Wild Toronto, a water park in Brampton, Ontario, Canada, formerly an independent water park known as Wild Water Kingdom
- Wild Water Kingdom (album), an album by Himanshu Suri

== See also ==
- Wild Water (disambiguation)
