= Whitewater recreation in British Columbia =

Whitewater recreation in British Columbia is available in most of the province. Except for north-central and northeast British Columbia, the province is mostly mountainous with many glacial fed rivers draining though steep terrain creating excellent whitewater. Most commercial whitewater operations in British Columbia are rafting outfitters. However the provinces rivers are also well known to be good for whitewater kayaking, whitewater canoeing and river surfing (in select spots) although these activities are often done unguided.

== Commercially guided whitewater rivers ==
British Columbia has many commercially rafted whitewater rivers ranging from half day float trips to week-long wilderness expeditions though raging Class 5 Rapids. Only the most notable are mentioned below.

=== Fraser River ===
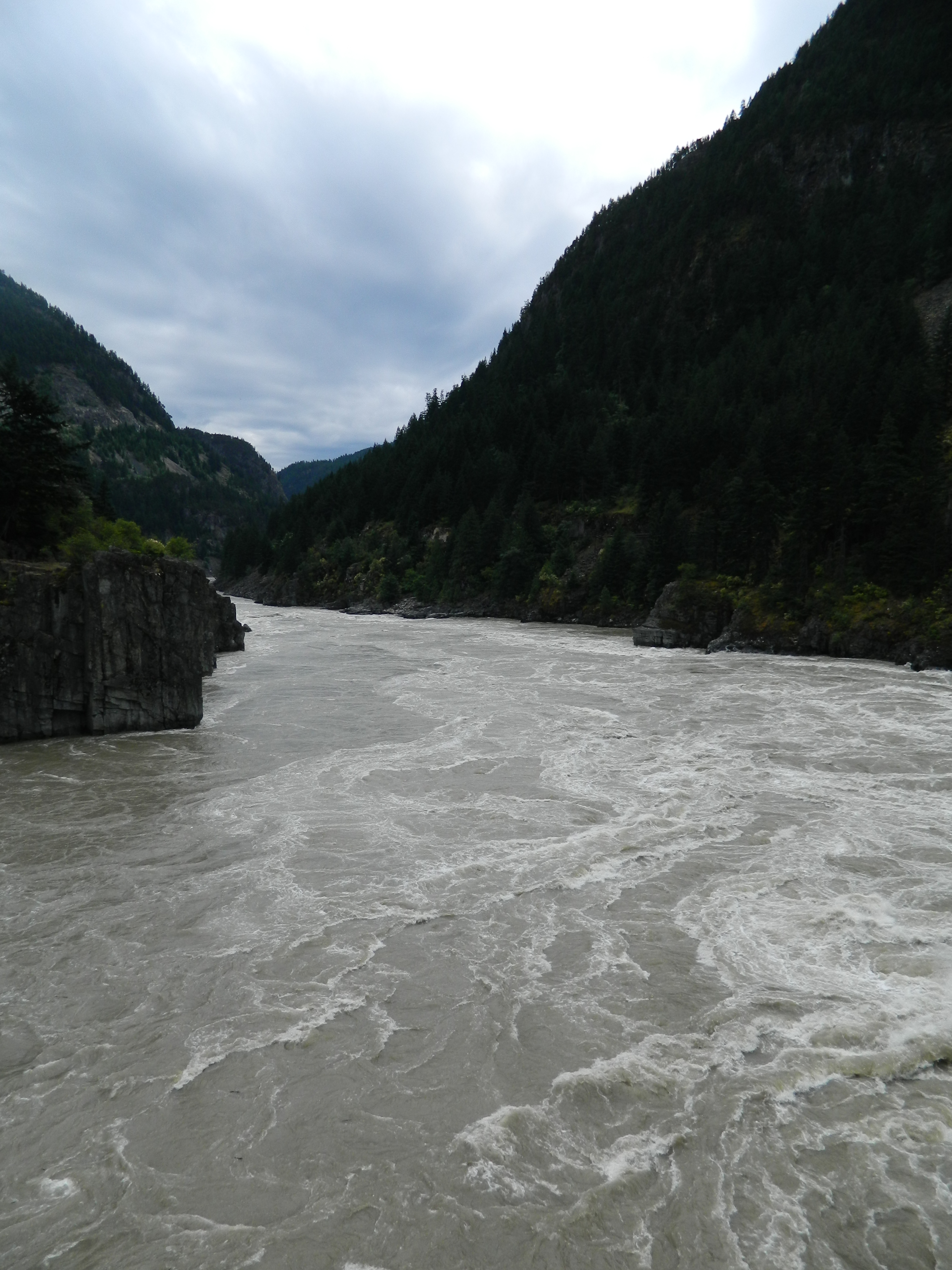
Hells Gate

The Fraser River is the largest un-dammed whitewater river in North America with an average flow rate of 3,475m3/s. The river has a steep gradient in a 270 kilometre long Fraser Canyon forming major rapids rated up to Class 5. Major named rapids include Hells Gate and the Bridge River Rapids. Due to its high flows, scenic canyon and numerous rapids it represents the pinnacle of whitewater rafting and kayaking in British Columbia and is one of the largest commercially rafted rivers in the world. Several outfitters and rafting companies run tours on the Fraser River.

=== Thompson River ===
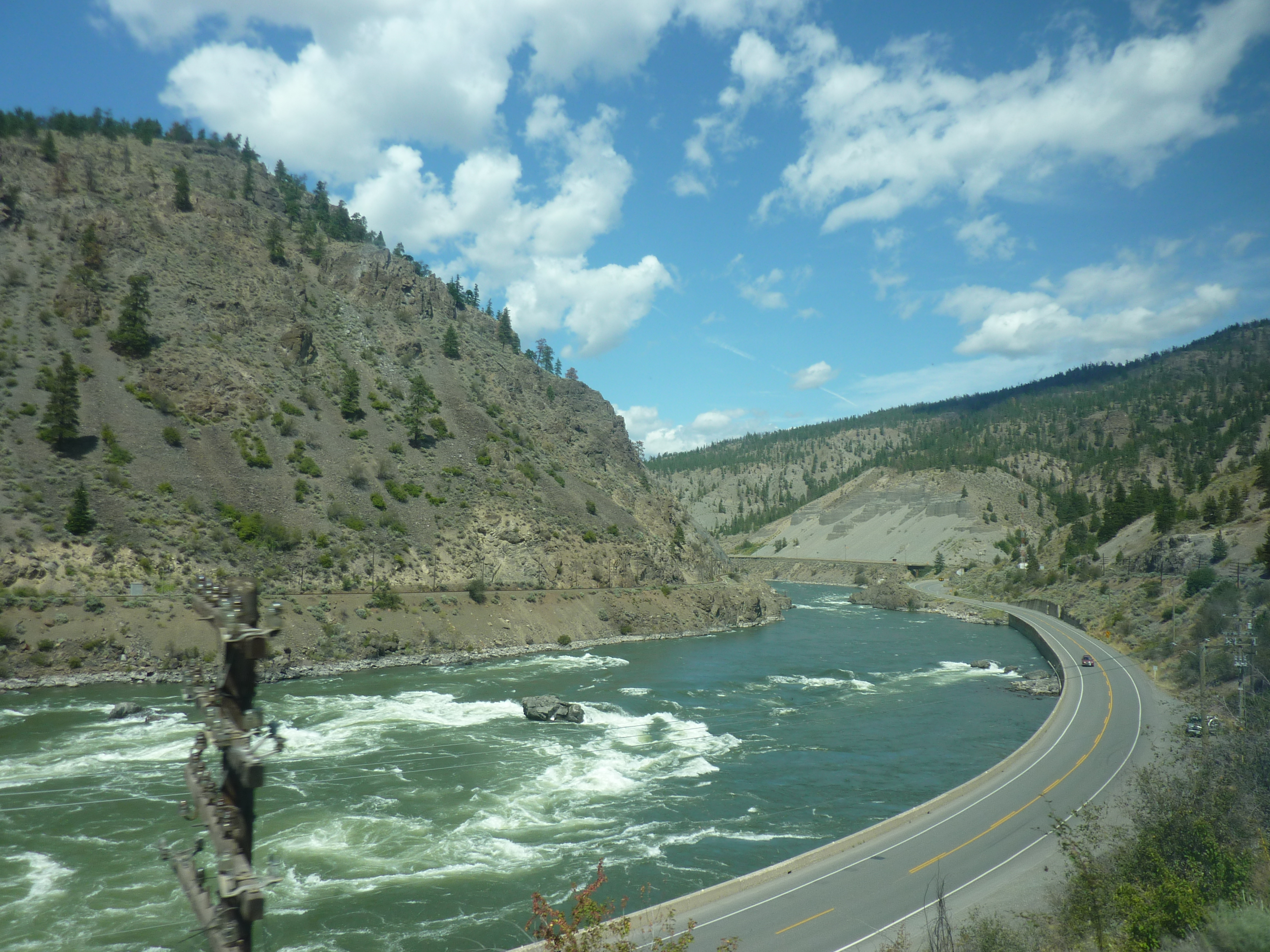
Rapids on the Thompson River

The Thompson River is a major tributary of the Fraser River and features rapids and canyon scenery similar to the Fraser but on a smaller scale. While it is a slightly lower difficulty than the Fraser due to its lower water volume, its whitewater is considered among the best in British Columbia. Due to its slightly easier rapids it sees more commercial rafting than the Fraser. Some runs start on the Thompson River and continue down the Fraser after the Thompson merges with it in Lytton.

=== Chilcotin and Chilko Rivers ===
The Chilcotin River is a midsized tributary of the Fraser which along with its main tributary the Chilko River contain notable whitewater. The two rivers travel largely though wilderness and the running them both takes multiple days. Trips on these rivers often include the Fraser as well after they merge. A few outfitters offer theses rivers as a weeklong rafting trip.

=== Clearwater River ===
The Clearwater River is a midsized tributary of the North Thompson River (part of the Fraser River Drainage) located in central British Columbia. This river's watershed is mostly located in Wells Gray Provincial Park a popular camping destination. Due to the geology of the area the river contain's numerous whitewater features including several waterfalls and major rapids. A section of the river near the downstream end of the Park is very popular for commercial rafting day trips mostly organized from the nearby town of Clearwater. The largest rapids on this section are Class 4. Other sections of the river contain large waterfalls and rapids up to Class 6 and are only suitable for expert whitewater kayakers. The lower section of this river also contains several features that are good for river surfing.

=== Kicking Horse River ===
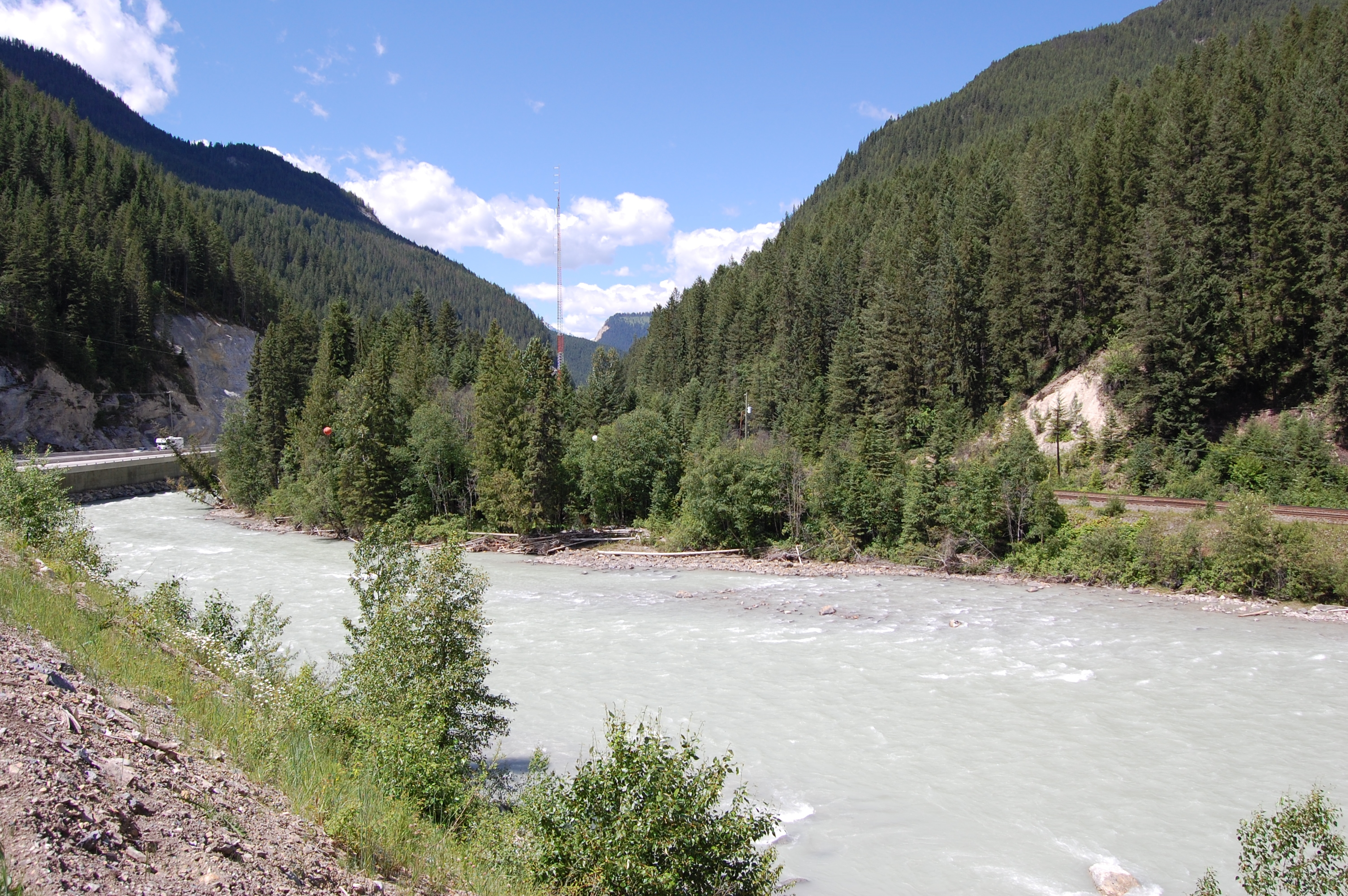
Kicking Horse River

The Kicking Horse River is a small tributary of the Columbia River located in eastern British Columbia near the town of Golden. Due to its location along the Trans Canada Highway the area sees significant tourism including numerous day rafting outfitters. Only the section of the river below Wapta Falls is commercially run.

=== Chilliwack River ===
The Chilliwack River is a small tributary of the Fraser River located in the Lower Mainland of British Columbia. Due to its proximity to Vancouver and moderate whitewater it is frequently run by both guided and un guided rafters and kayakers. In late summer and fall the river goes almost dry and cannot be run.

=== Tatshenshini and Alsek Rivers ===
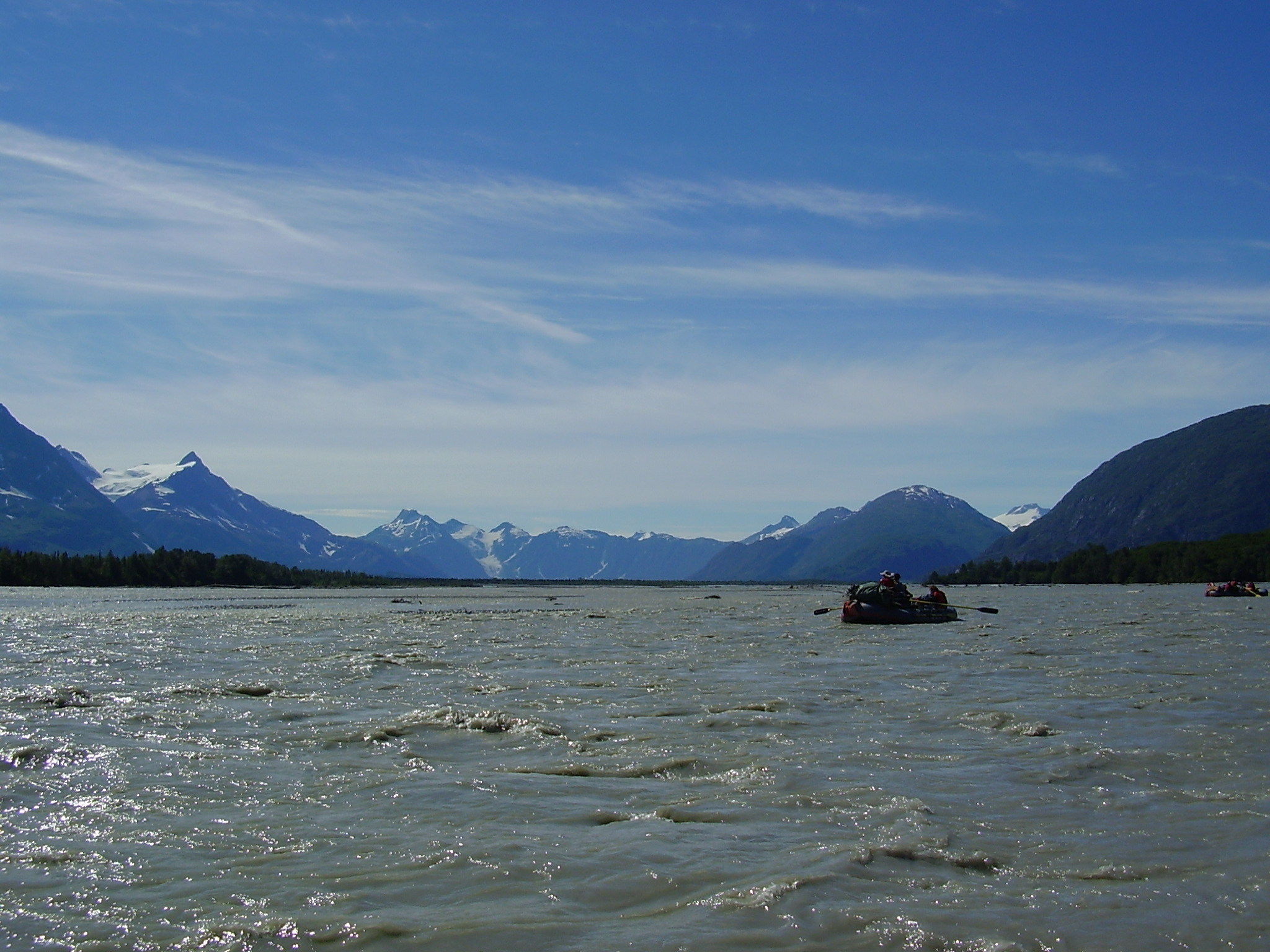
Rafting on the Alsek River

This Alsek River system is located in the extreme north west corner of British Columbia and flows into Alaska. It unique scenery and significant rapids. In several locations glaciers feed directly into the river and rafts can paddle on lakes next to icebergs. Being located in an extremely remote area only week long expeditions are possible with a fly in and out required. Despite the remoteness, several outfitters operate on this river. The Turnback Canyon section is never run by commercial rafting outfitters and has only been conquered by a handful of world class whitewater kayakers.

== Other notable whitewater rivers ==
=== Stikine River ===
The Stikine River's Grand Canyon of the Stikine run is known for being one of the most difficult whitewater descents in the world. Officially considered unnavigable by B.C. parks, it has been run by only a handful of the most experienced whitewater enthusiasts, almost always with air support. The canyon is extremely deep, preventing any chance for kayaker to bail out mid trip. Despite being a decently large river the Stikine squeezes through surging chutes only a meter wide, the descent also includes several small waterfalls.

=== Liard River ===
Located in the northern wilderness near the border of the Yukon Territory, the Liard River is British Columbia's second largest un-dammed river and contains a half dozen monstrous Class 5+ rapids in the Grand Canyon of the Liard, the largest of which are the Class 6 Hells Gate (not to be confused with the rapid of the same name on the Fraser River) and The Rapids of the Drowned. Despite being one of the largest and most powerful whitewater rivers in the world the Liard receives very little attention in the present due to the canyon's remote location and the rapids being far too large for safe commercial rafting operations. Liard River Corridor Provincial Park and Protected Area was established in 1999 to prevent the rapids from being harnessed for hydroelectric power.

== Tidal Rapids ==
Skookumchuck Narrows is the only well known and easily accessible tidal rapid in British Columbia; it is located on the Sunshine Coast near the village of Earls Cove. They can range in strength from Class 5 to flat-water depending on the tide at the time of visitation. Some local operators offer tours through the rapids in Zodiacs (but only when they are less than half their peak strength) but most of the visitation is from solo whitewater kayakers and surfers.

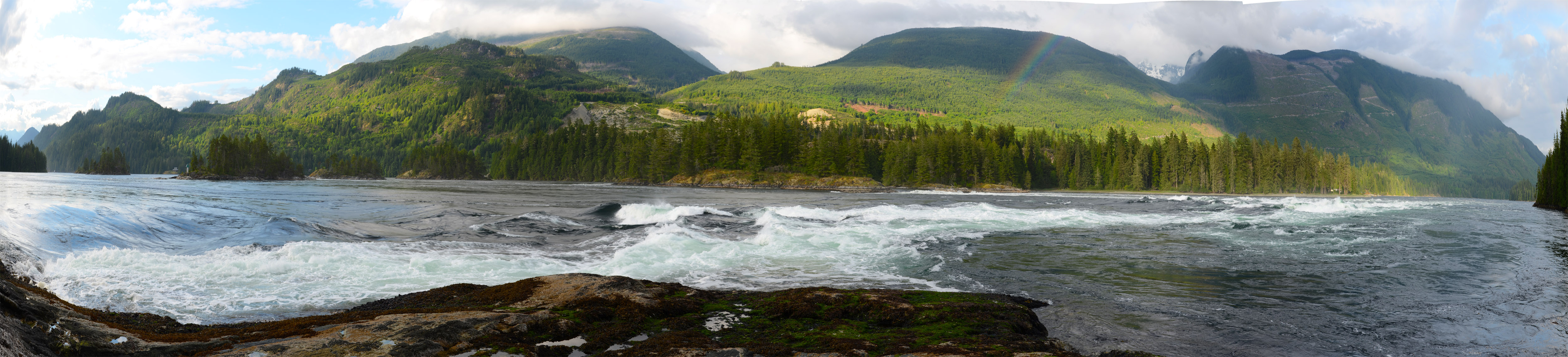
Skookumchuck Narrows
