= Rapid =

Rapid, Rapids or RAPID may refer to:

== Places and geography ==
- Rapids, sections of a river with turbulent water flow
- Rapid Creek (Iowa River tributary), Iowa, United States
- Rapid Creek (South Dakota), United States, namesake of Rapid City

== Sports teams ==
- SK Rapid Wien, an Austrian club
- FC Rapid Ghidighici, a Moldovan club
- SK Rapid (Norway), a Norwegian club
- FC Rapid București, a Romanian club
- CS Rapid București, a Romanian women's basketball club
- FK Rapid Bratislava, a Slovak club
- SV Rapid Marburg, a Yugoslav former club that today would be Slovene
- Colorado Rapids, an American team

== Transportation ==
- Rapid (ship), the brig that brought William Light's surveying party to South Australia in 1836
- RTA Rapid Transit or The Rapid, the rail transit service of Cleveland area, Ohio, US
- The Rapid, a bus system in the Greater Grand Rapids, Michigan area, US
- Rapid (San Diego), a BRT system serving the Greater San Diego region, California, US
- Rapid Rail, a rapid transit operator in Malaysia
- Rapid Bus, a bus operator in Malaysia
- Rapid Ferry, a ferry operator in Penang, Malaysia
- Renault Rapid, a van
- Škoda Rapid (disambiguation), several cars built by Škoda Auto
- Società Torinese Automobili Rapid, also known as Rapid, an Italian car manufacturer between 1904 and 1921

== Other uses ==
- RAPID, a programming language
- Rural Address Property Identification, a scheme in New Zealand
- Refinery and Petrochemical Integrated Development Project, part of the Pengerang Integrated Petroleum Complex
- Rapid Advancement in Process Intensification Deployment, a Manufacturing USA research institute
- Recommend, agree, perform, input, decide, a responsibility assignment matrix

== See also ==
- Bob Feller (1918–2010), American Hall-of-Fame baseball pitcher nicknamed "Rapid Robert"
- Rabid (disambiguation)
- Rabit (disambiguation)
- Rapi:t, a train service in Japan
- Rapid antigen test, a rapid diagnostic test
