= Whitewater canoeing =

Paddling a canoe on a moving body of water

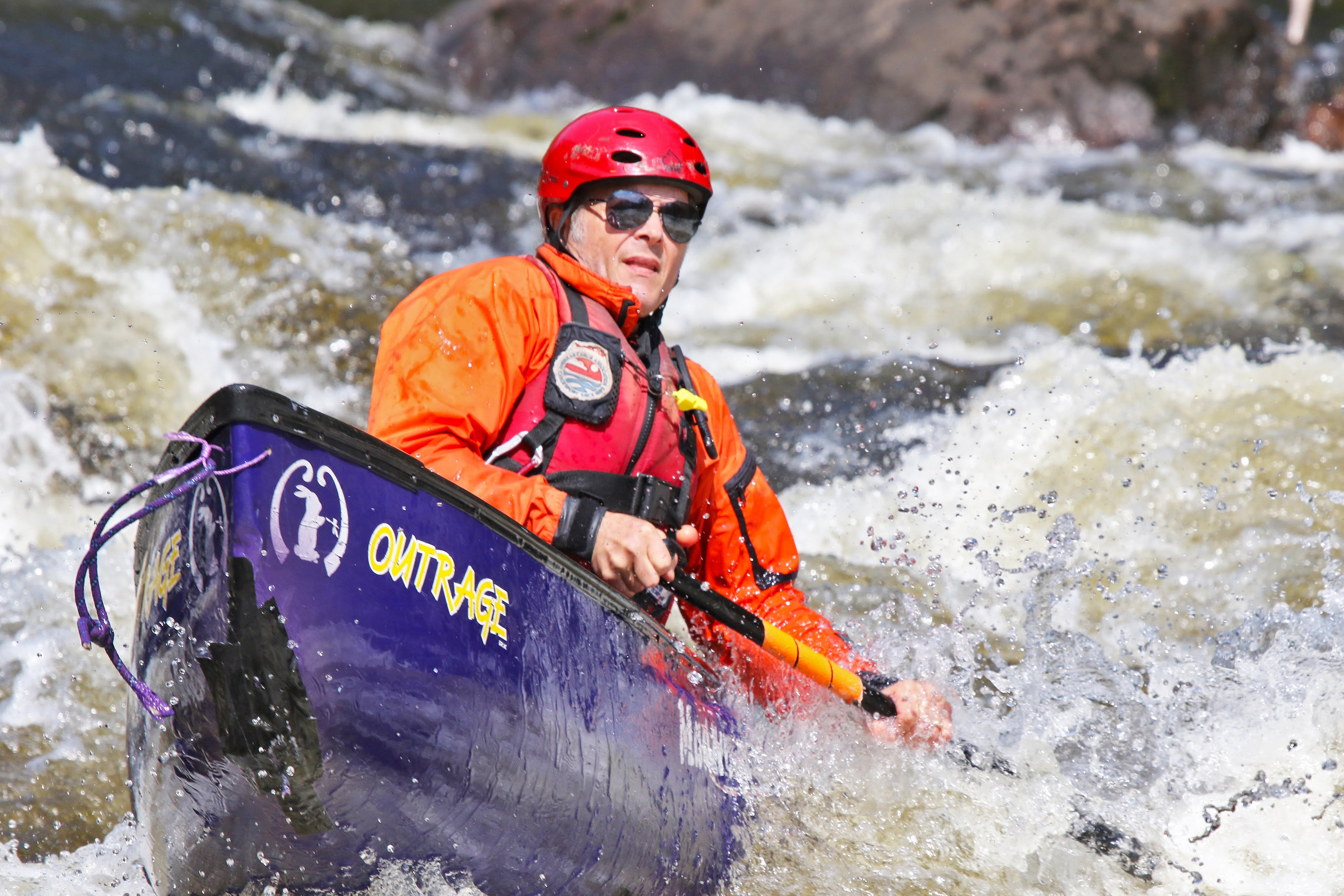
Whitewater canoeist Marty Plante on the class 4 Narrows Rapids of the Hudson River Gorge, New York State, USA

Whitewater canoeing is the sport of paddling a canoe on a moving body of water, typically a whitewater river. Whitewater canoeing can range from simple, carefree, gently moving water to demanding, dangerous whitewater. River rapids are graded like ski runs according to the difficulty, danger, or severity of the rapid. Whitewater grades (or classes) range from I or 1 (the easiest) to VI or 6 (the most difficult/dangerous). Grade/Class I can be described as slightly moving water with ripples. Grade/Class VI can be described as severe or almost unrunnable whitewater, such as Niagara Falls.

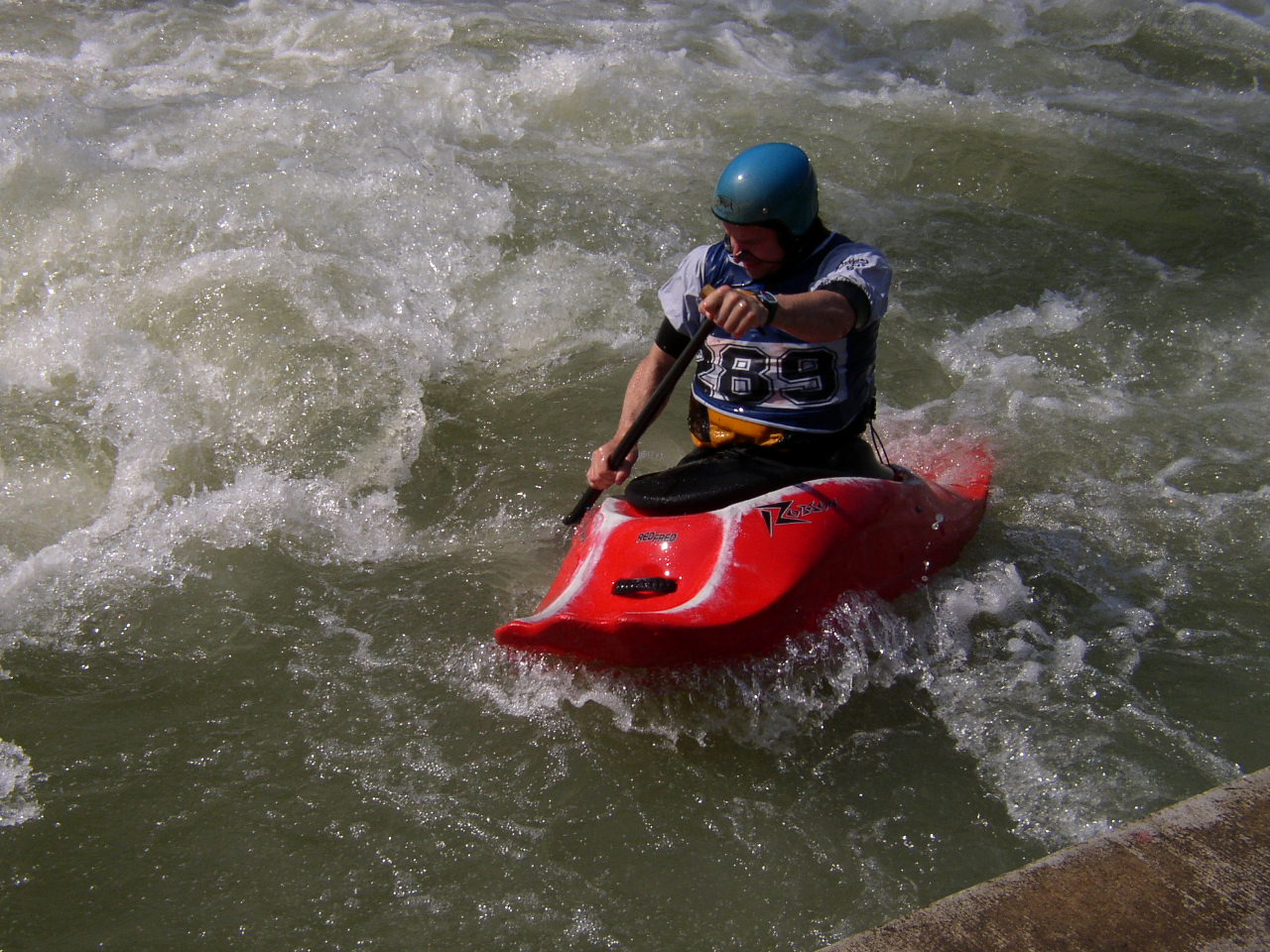
A whitewater canoer during Eurocup Playboating (Canoe-Freestyle), on the Eiskanal in Augsburg, Germany

== Design ==
Modern whitewater canoe

The canoe (or just 'boat') used in casual whitewater canoeing is different from those used in whitewater racing. Traditionally, canoes were made of tree bark, sewn with tree roots and sealed with resin. Early whitewater boats were made of wood, followed by aluminium and later fiberglass or kevlar, followed by more exotic composite materials including spectra, vectran and carbon fiber. The various composite materials are still preferred for racing due to the lightweight, but most modern recreational whitewater boats are typically rotomoulded from a tough plastic or molded from a plastic laminate called Royalex which is an ABS plastic that is slightly flexible and very durable, is easily scratched but repairable using either plastic welding or a variety of patch bonding techniques. Boats can range in size from barely long enough to hold the paddler (around 6 ft (1.8 m) long), up to 12 ft (3.7 m) or longer for solo boats and typically 14–16 ft for tandem boats.

== History ==
Paddling on rivers, lakes, and oceans is as old as the Stone Age. The raft, the catamaran, the canoe, and the kayak evolved depending on the needs and environment of the indigenous peoples in different parts of the world. The modern-day canoe most likely originated about 8,000 years ago.

The Greek, Herodotus, 484-425 BC, wrote in his travel diaries about boats with which merchandise was brought from Armenia to Babylon. The boats were made of a wooden framework that was covered with animal skins. Mules hauled the precious skins back to Armenia.

The Scot, John MacGregor published in 1866 the book A Thousand Miles in the Roy Rob Canoe. The timing was right, and the book became a resounding success. With the Industrial Revolution leading to more leisure time in the middle of the 19th century, people in Europe started to enjoy floating down rivers in all kinds of contraptions, taking in nature previously only available to a select few.

== Types ==
There are several 'sub-categories' in whitewater canoeing:

=== River running ===
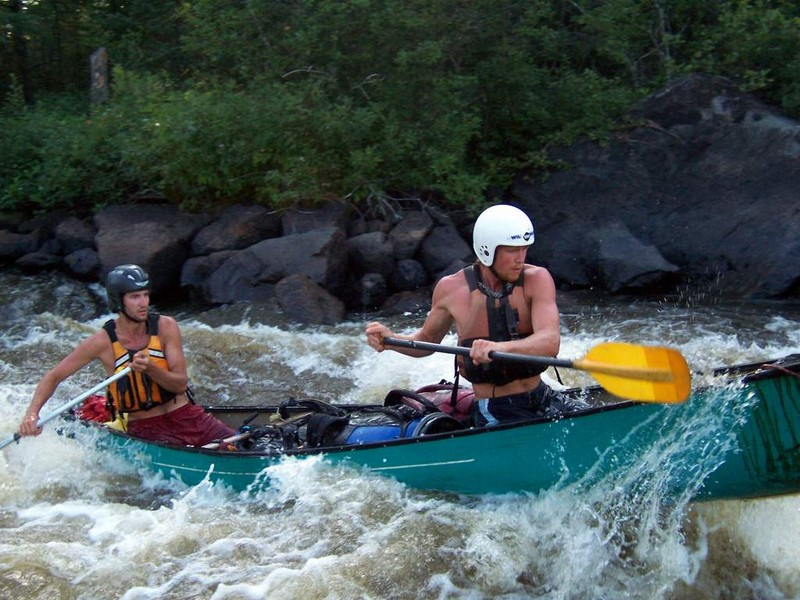
Touring canoe on the Kesagami River, Ontario, Canada

River running can be thought of as a tour down a river, to enjoy the scenery as well as experience challenging whitewater. River running includes short day trips as well as longer multi-day trips. Multi-day canoe trips often entail the use of gear-toting rafts to allow a more comfortable experience without a heavily laden canoe, although many people also carry their own gear in their canoes, especially on remote or wilderness sections of rivers. Canoes with gear typically are not commonly used above class IV whitewater without portages. Sometimes, open touring canoes with gear used on multi-day trips are fitted with fabric spraycovers. Whitewater racing is the competitive aspect of this sub-category, where canoes race down a river as fast as possible.

=== Creeking ===
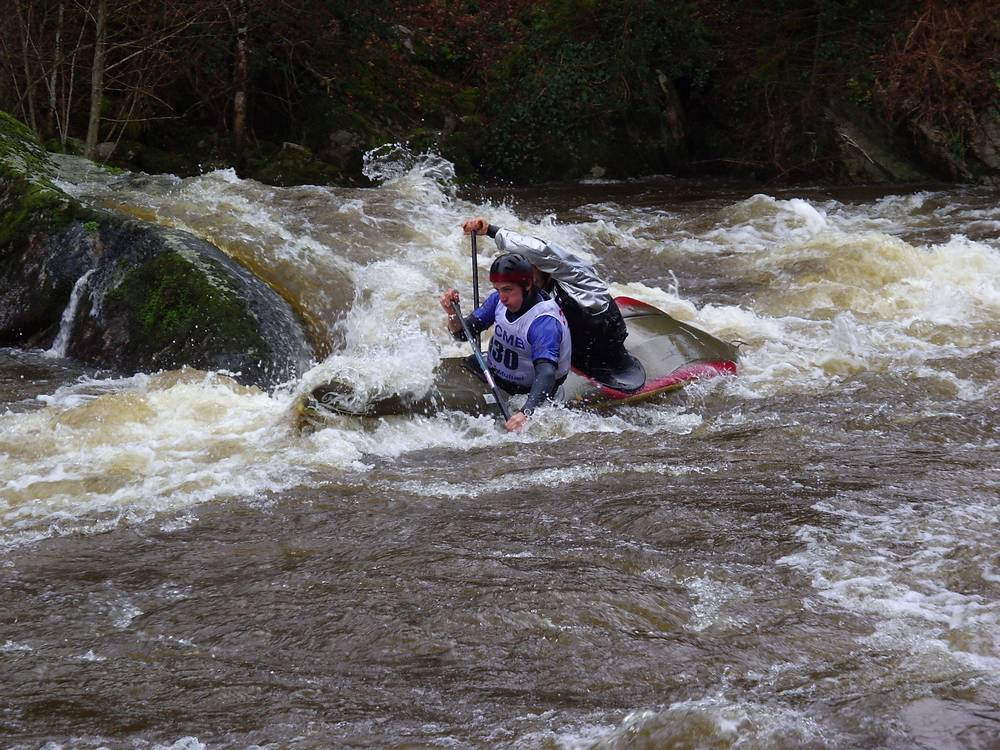
Roches du Diable

Creeking is perhaps best thought of as a subcategory of river running, involving very technical and difficult rapids, typically in the Grade/Class IV to VI range. While people will differ on the definition, creeking generally involves a higher gradient, approaching or in excess of 100 ft per mi (19 m per km), and is likely to include running ledges, slides, and waterfalls on relatively small and tight rivers, though some will allow for very large and high-volume rivers in their definition. Canoes used for creeking usually have higher volume (more gallons or liters of displacement) and more rounded bow and stern, as these features provide an extra margin of safety against the likelihood of pinning, and will resurface more quickly and controllably when coming off larger drops. Creek boats usually have increased "rocker," or rise, on the bow to go up and over obstacles and obstructions within the river. It is a continuous rocker, which means that the curvature of the bottom of the boat is a constant curve, so there is less water contact. Extreme racing is a competitive form of this aspect of whitewater canoeing, in which canoers race down steep sections and or generally dangerous sections of whitewater.

=== Slalom ===
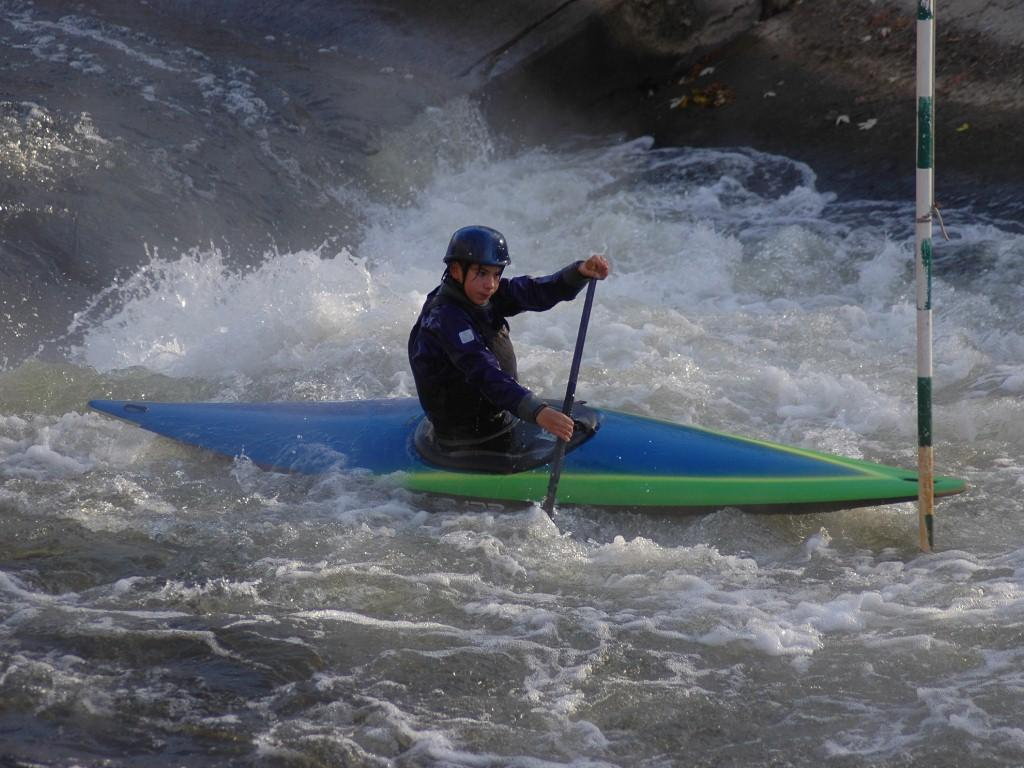
Whitewater slalom at Dickerson Whitewater Course, Maryland, USA

Slalom is a technical competitive form of canoeing, and the only whitewater event to appear in the Olympic Games. Racers attempt to make their way from the top to the bottom of a designated section of river as fast as possible, while correctly negotiating gates (a series of double-poles suspended vertically over the river). There are usually 18-25 gates in a race, which must be navigated in sequential order. Green gates must be negotiated in a downstream direction, red gates in an upstream direction. The events are typically conducted on Grade/Class II to Grade/Class IV water, but the placement of the gates and precision necessary to paddle them fast and "clean" (without touching a pole and adding 2 seconds to the total time), make the moves much harder than the water's difficulty suggests. (Slalom has been described as performing class V moves with class III consequences.) Pro-level slalom competitions have specific length (350 cm (140 in) for kayaks - new rules), width, and weight requirements for the boats, which will be made out of kevlar/fiberglass/carbon fiber composites to be lightweight and have faster hull speed. Plastic whitewater canoes can be used in citizen-level races. In the United States and Canada, there are separate slalom organizations and races for decked canoes and open canoes.

=== Canoe freestyle ===
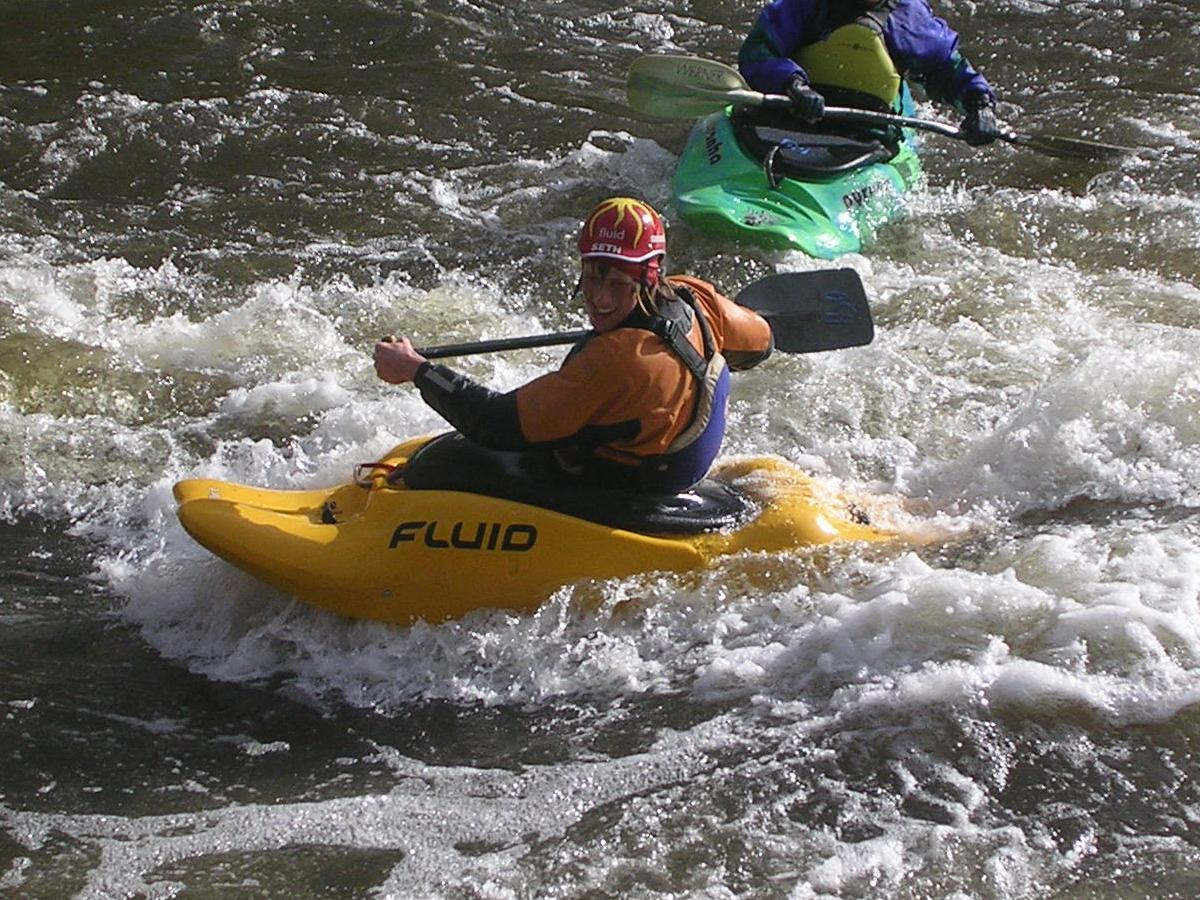
Whitewater playboating

Playboating, also known as Playboating or Rodeo, is a more gymnastic and artistic kind of canoeing. While the other varieties of canoeing generally involve going from Point A to Point B, playboaters often stay in one spot in the river (usually in a hole, pourover or on a wave) where they work with and against the dynamic forces of the river to perform a variety of maneuvers. These can include surfing, spinning, and various vertical moves (cartwheels, loops, blunts, pistol and donkey flips, and many others), spinning the boat on all possible axes of rotation. More recently, aerial moves have become accessible, where paddlers perform tricks having gained air from using the speed and bounce of the wave. Canoes used for playboating generally have relatively low volume in the bow and stern, allowing the paddler to submerge the ends of the canoe with relative ease. Competitions for playboating or freestyle are sometimes called whitewater rodeo in the US, but more frequently just referred to as freestyle events in UK and Europe.

== Techniques ==
=== Boofing ===
Boofing, in whitewater canoeing, refers to the raising of the canoe's bow during freefall, while descending a ledge, ducking behind a boulder, or running a waterfall. This technique is used to avoid submerging the bow of the canoe by ensuring it lands flat when it hits the base of the waterfall. The term is an onomatopoeia which mimics the sound that is usually created when the hull of the canoe makes contact with water at the base of the waterfall.

Another type of boof is the "rock boof," which is a move that uses a glancing impact with a boulder at the top of a ledge to bounce the boater over a downstream feature, often finished with a mid-air eddy turn. Rock boofs result in sounds both at the top of the drop (boat impacting rock) and the bottom (boat bellyflopping into the water).

==== Bracing ====
Another technique used to prevent the bow of the canoe from submerging. The bowsman uses his paddle like an outrigger held horizontally to the river's surface. Used mostly to limit the amount of water the canoe takes in during running rapids.

==== Lining ====
Some rapids and rock gardens are navigable when no one is in the canoe. A line is attached to the canoe; it must be centre lined to the canoe's axis, and the canoer, on shore, simply allows the canoe to run the rapids empty while reeling in or reeling out rope as necessary.

==== Carry ====
Sometimes the only way to get over an obstacle, like a beaver dam or a shallow rock ledge, is to get out of the canoe and lift it or drag it over.

==== One Man ====
To keep the bow as high as possible, it has been found effective to keep weight in the front, as well as to have no bowman.

== See also ==
- Canoeing and kayaking at the Summer Olympics
- Freeboating
- List of whitewater rivers
- Whitewater recreation in British Columbia
