= Wild Water (Norwegian band) =

Norwegian rock band

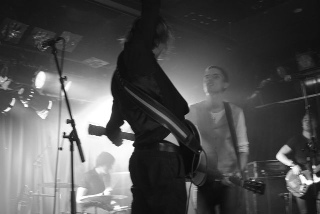

Background information
- Origin: Oslo, Norway
- Genres: Rock
- Years active: 2003–present
- Labels: Wild Water Music/Sonet
- Members: Harald Verpe, Tinus Ivanov, Daniel Brinch and Olav Verpe
- Website: wildwatermusic.com

Wild Water is a rock band from Norway. The group was founded in 2003 by Olav Verpe and Daniel Brinch. During the winter of 2008 Wild Water was discovered by former Turbonegro guitarist Rune Grønn, and on 16 March 2009 their third album That great view was released on the Norwegian indie label Sonet.

Wild Water has despite their young age already worked with some of Norway's most renown musicians. "That Great View" was produced by Animal Alpha guitarist Christer-André Cederberg, and During summer of 2007 Wild Water recorded their second album with Norwegian guitar legend Freddy Lindquist as the producer. All three albums are mastered by Chris Sansom.

All of the members in Wild Water have spent a lot of time working with different youth-programs in the eastern parts of Oslo. Summer of 2007 the band arranged a musical festival along with the charity organization Save the Children Fund.

== Members ==
- Harald Verpe – Drums
- Olav Verpe – Vocals/Bass
- Daniel Brinch – Guitar

== Past members ==
- Kenmare Knapstad - Guitar
- Thomas Hagen - Bass
- Andreas Rygg Kjelstrup - Drums

== Discography ==
- Wild Water EP (2006)
- Let's talk about life (2007)
- That Great View (2009)
- "No Legacy EP" (2010)
