= Aksu Canyon =

Canyon in Kazakhstan

- Aqsý shatqaly
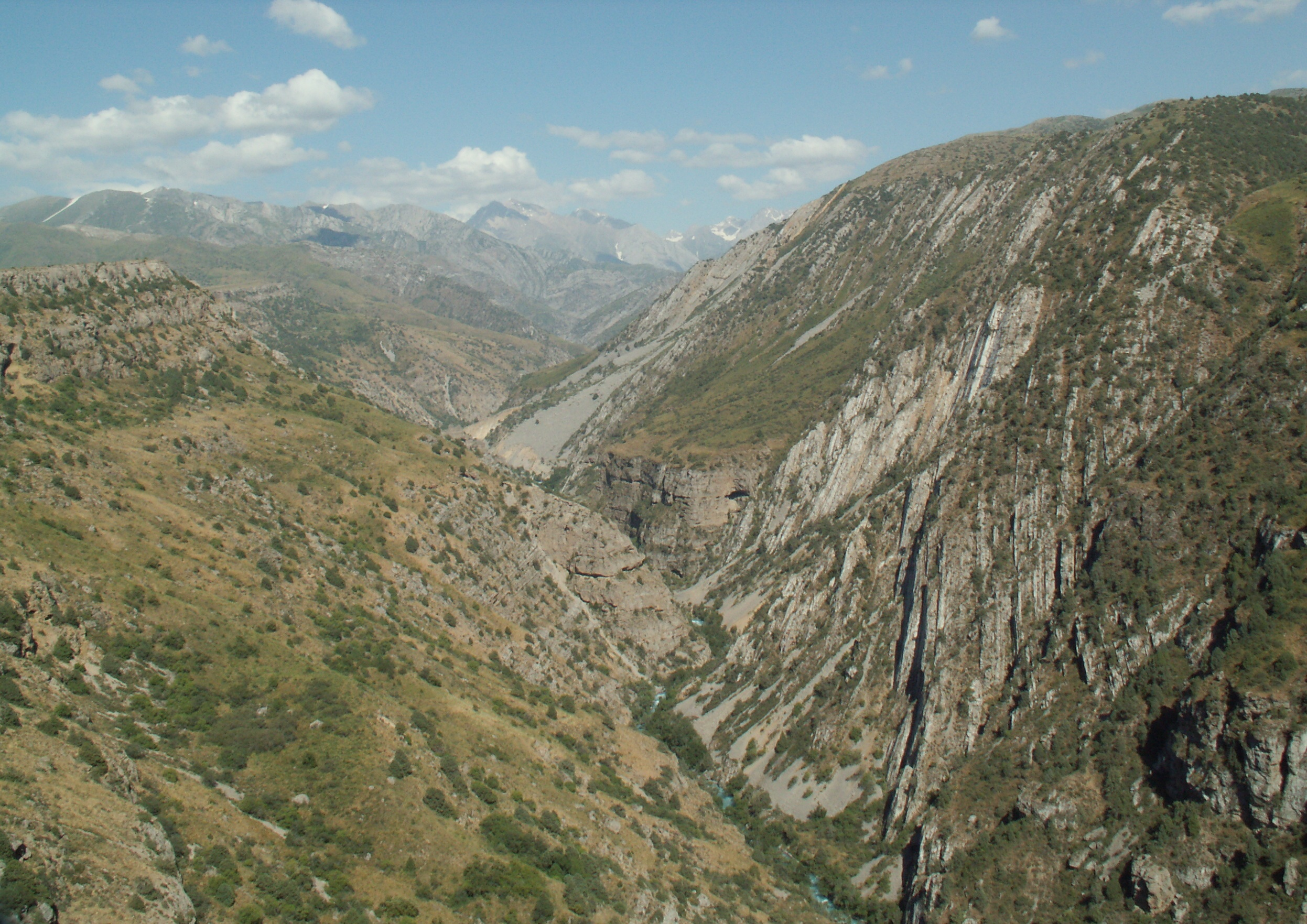
- Upper part of Aksu Canyon in the Aksu-Zhabagly National Reserve

- Location within Kazakhstan
- Length: 15 kilometres (9.3 mi)

Geography
- Location: Shymkent, Kazakhstan
- Coordinates: 42°19′21″N 70°14′32″E
- Rivers: Aksu River
- Interactive map of Aksu Canyon

Aksu Canyon (also known as Aqsý shatqaly) is a canyon on the Aksu River in Kazakhstan. The canyon is 15 km long and 500m deep canyon and located in southern Kazakhstan in the Turkistan region in the north-west of the Tian Shan mountain range and east of the outskirts of one-million-people city Shymkent. Aksu Canyon is one of the largest canyons in Central Asia and beside the Sharyn Canyon one of the most popular canyons in Kazakhstan. It has an alpine character with nearby mountains reaching over 4000m. The Aksu-Zhabagly Nature Reserve, though relatively small in area, is rich in wildlife and included in the UNESCO world heritage site Western Tian Shan.
