= Aksu (surname) =

Aksu is a Turkish surname. Notable people with the surname include:

- Abdülkadir Aksu (born 1944), Turkish politician
- Bora Aksu, Turkish fashion designer
- Cafercan Aksu (born 1987), Turkish football player
- Sezen Aksu (born 1954), Turkish pop musician
