= Agua Blanca, La Rioja =

Coordinates: 28°58′S 66°59′W

Agua Blanca
- Municipality and village
- Interactive map of Agua Blanca
- Country: Argentina
- Province: La Rioja Province
- Time zone: UTC−3 (ART)

Agua Blanca is a municipality and village in La Rioja Province in northwestern Argentina.
