= White Water Bay =

White Water Bay may refer to:

- Whitewater Bay, inlet of the Gulf of Mexico in southwestern Florida in the United States
- White Water Bay (New York), now operating as Great Escape Lodge & Indoor Waterpark
- White Water Bay (Oklahoma), now operating as Six Flags Hurricane Harbor Oklahoma City
- White Water Bay (Texas), now operating as Six Flags Hurricane Harbor San Antonio

== See also ==
- Six Flags White Water, Atlanta, Georgia, U.S.
