= Aksu River =

Aksu River may refer to:

- Aksu, the name of the Bartang River in its upper reaches in Afghanistan and Tajikistan
- Aksu River (Xinjiang), a transnational river in Xinjiang, China and Issyk-Kul Province, Kyrgyzstan
- Aksu (Lake Balkhash), flowing into Lake Balkhash in Kazakhstan
- Aksu (Arys), a tributary of the Arys, Kazakhstan
- Aksu River (Turkey), a river in Antalya Province, classically called the Cestrus
- Aksu Deresi, a river in Giresun Province, Turkey
- Aksu River (Uzbekistan), the location of the Gissarak Dam, one of the tallest dams in the world
