= Aksu-Zhabagly Nature Reserve =

Biosphere reserve in Kazakhstan

- Location within Kazakhstan
- Location: South Kazakhstan, Kazakhstan
- Nearest city: Tulkubas
- Coordinates: 42°22′44″N 70°36′35″E
- Area: 1,319.339 km^{2} (326,016 acres)
- Established: 1926

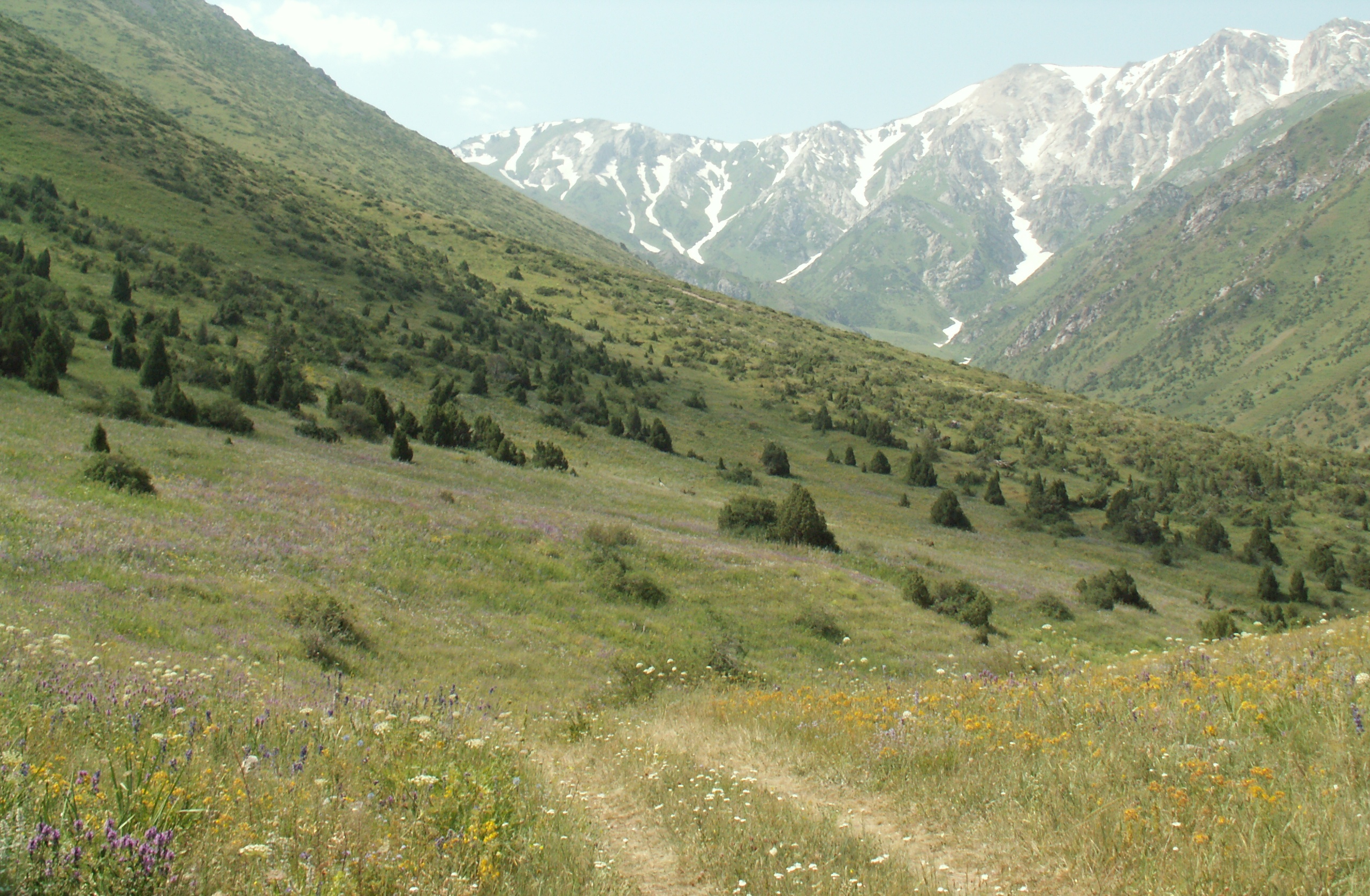
Plateau between the rivers Kshi- and Ulken Kaindy, Zhabagly mountains, Aksu-Zhabagly Nature Reserve

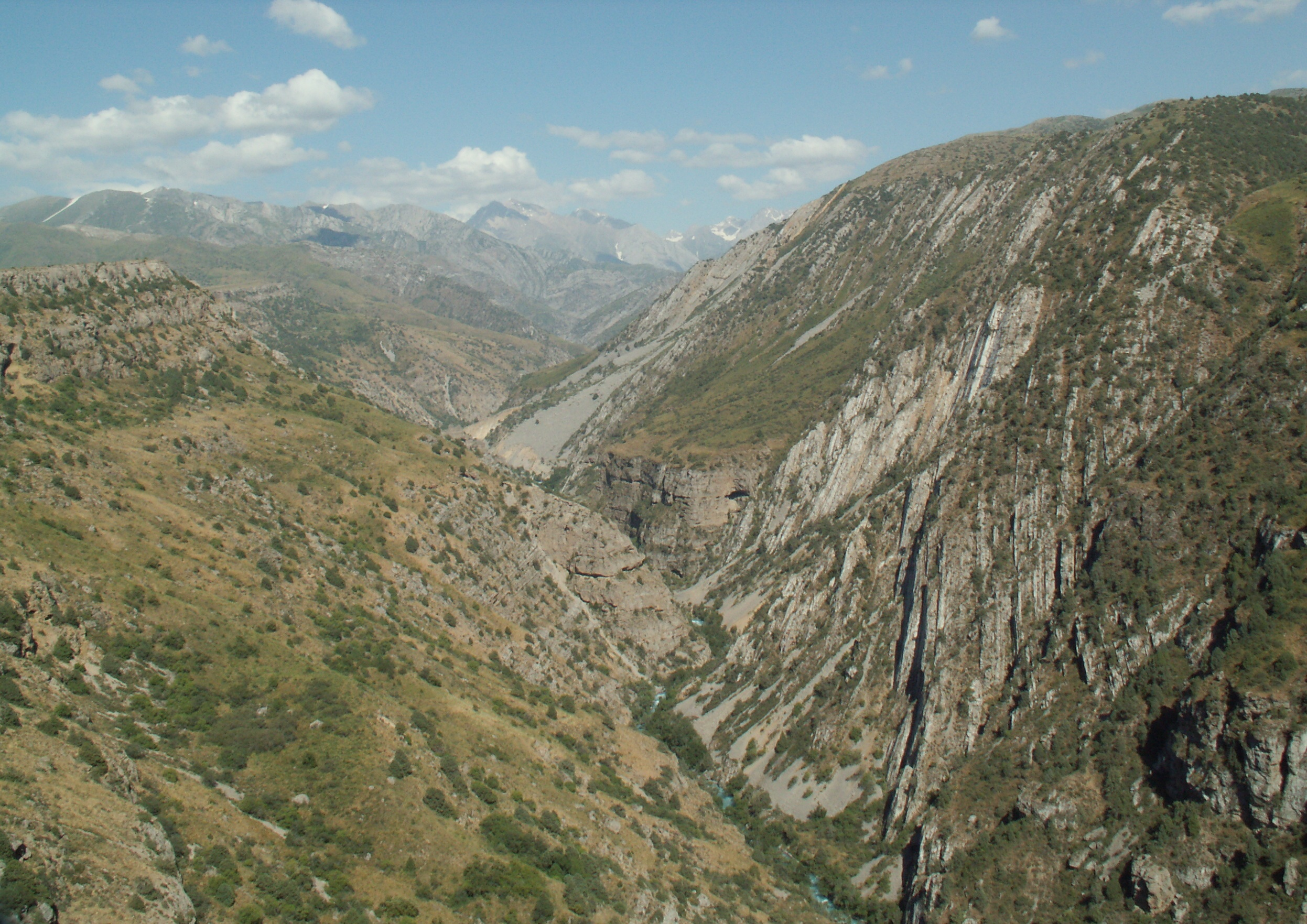
Aksu Canyon, Aksu-Zhabagly Nature Reserve

The Aksu-Zhabagly Nature Reserve (Kazakh: Ақсу-Жабағылы қорығы, Aqsu-Jabağyly Qoryğy; Russian: Aксу-Жабаглинский заповедник, Aksu-Zhabaglinskiy zapovednik) is the oldest nature reserve in Central Asia. It is located in the southern province of the Republic of Kazakhstan. It covers the north-western mountain chains of the Tian Shan. Its name is derived from the biggest river in the area, the Aksu, and the mountain chain Zhabagly which is located in the northern part of the area.

== Geography ==
The Aksu-Zhabagly Nature Reserve is located in the western mountains of the Talasskiy Alatau, in the western Tien Shan mountains. Its eastern border is delimited by the Kyrgyz Republic, the southern border by the valley of the Maidantal river and the Uzbekistan. In the West, the area is surrounded by the Kyzyl Kum, and in the North, by the Karatau Mountains. The Tien Shan mountains extend further to the East and South. The territory lies within the administrative region of the Tyul’kubaskiy- and Lengerskiy-Rayon, in the South Kazakhstan Province. The Nature Reserve stretches over an area of 131.934 ha., occupying elevations of 1100–4236 m a.s.l. Major mountain ranges are the Zhabagly in the North, the Talasskiy Alatau in the central part, the Baldybrektau and the Ugamskiy Alatau in the South. They form steep slopes as well as gentle plateaus. Peak Sayram, in the southern region, is the highest peak in the Reserve. The mountainous area is divided by the Jabagly, Aksu and Baldyrbek rivers, that all drain in a western direction into the Syrdarya that in turn flows into the Aral Sea. The Aksu river formed Aksu Canyon which is 500m deep, and can only be crossed in the southern part of the reserve by walking over a narrow pedestrian bridge.

== Geology ==
Paleozoic limestone, dolomite and carbonaceous tuff are the most dominant bedrock in the nature reserve Thick loess has accumulated on plateaus and in the foothills. Much less frequent is the siliceous magmatic bedrock of the Perm era.

Ecotourism has been a popular destination in the reserve for 10 years, thanks to the rich flora and fauna that has contributed to the development of recreational tourism.

== Flora and vegetation ==
The Aksu-Zhabagly Nature Reserve harbors 1312 vascular plants. Some of the largest genera are Astragalus, Gagea, Allium, Carex and Oxytropis. There are 44 rare plant species that are listed as endangered in the red data book of Kazakhstan, including the native wild apple (Malus sieversii), wild grape (Vitis vinifera) and several wild tulip species (e.g.. Tulipa greigii). The lower parts of the reserve are covered by semi-desert, scrub and steppe, which form a colorful carpet of geophytes in the spring. The montane belt is a mosaic of open juniper forests with Juniperus seravshanica and Juniperus semiglobosa, and meadows in which Eurosiberian and Middle Asian plants thrive. The Aksu Canyon harbors some forest fragments with Malus sieversii und the Turkestan Maple (Acer turkestanicum). Further up, in the subalpine and alpine belt, we find meadows, tall herb vegetation, and small cushion communities with Onobrychis echidna, as well as short grass sods with Carex melanantha and Kobresia persica. Gallery forests of willows and birches grow along the main rivers. Scree vegetation is frequent in the area and home to the rare onion species Allium karataviense, also Iris willmottiana and Tulipa kaufmanniana can be found.

== Fauna ==
There are 44 mammal species in the Reserve that are enlisted as highly endangered in the red book of Kazakhstan. The most prominent species are the snow leopard which is, however, rarely seen. Somewhat more frequent is the Himalayan brown bear, the Tien Shan argali (Ovis ammon karelini), the Indian crested porcupine (Hystrix indica), and Menzbier's marmot.
