= Whitewater Township =

Whitewater Township may refer to:

- Whitewater Township, Franklin County, Indiana
- Whitewater Township, Dubuque County, Iowa, in Dubuque County, Iowa
- Whitewater Township, Grand Traverse County, Michigan
- Whitewater Township, Winona County, Minnesota
- Whitewater Township, Bollinger County, Missouri
- Whitewater Township, Cape Girardeau County, Missouri
- Whitewater Township, Hamilton County, Ohio
