= Agua Blanca (Ibiza) =

Beach in Ibiza, Spain

- Beach
- Coordinates: 39°3′34″N 1°35′19″E
- Location: Santa Eulària des Riu, Spain

Agua Blanca is a naturist beach on the Spanish island of Ibiza. It is in the municipality of Santa Eulària des Riu and is 6.4 miles (10.3 km) north east of the town of Santa Eulària des Riu. The nearest village is Sant Carles de Peralta which is 2.4 miles (3.9 km) south west of the beach. The name Agua Blanca means "white water" and refers to the choppy white horse's on the sea caused by often blowing winds. Agua Blanca like many of the beaches along this north east section of the island remain empty for most of the year.

This beach sits below steep cliffs . There is a length of fine sand which runs in an east-north-east direction. Very often there are strong sea breezes which head on to the beach. At the southern end of the beach there is a small cove with a satellite beach, accessed by a short swim. In the summer the beach is popular with families and is also a popular nudist spot. The waters are clean and safe for swimming. Along the near shore there are several rocky outcrops, providing an environment for snorkelling. The beach has a restaurant and a beach bar.
