= Rabies (disambiguation) =

Rabies is a viral disease that causes inflammation of the brain in humans and other mammals caused by lyssaviruses.

Rabies may also refer to:

- Rabies virus (Rabies lyssavirus), the type species of the Lyssavirus viral genus
- Rabies in animals, the effect of the virus seen in animals

== Arts and entertainment ==
- Rabies (1958 film), a Swedish TV drama film by Ingmar Bergman
- Rabies (2010 film), an Israeli slasher film by Aharon Keshales and Navot Papushado
- Rabies (2023 film), a Russian thriller film by Dmitry Dyachenko
- Rabies (novel), a 1983 thriller-horror novel by Borislav Pekić
- Rabies (Ruoska album), 2008
- Rabies (Skinny Puppy album), 1989

== See also ==
- Lyssaviruses, including the rabies virus and
  - Australian bat lyssavirus
- Rabi (disambiguation)
- Rabies in popular culture
