= Aguas Blancas, Salta =

Coordinates: 22°44′S 64°22′W

Aguas Blancas (Salta)
- Municipality and village
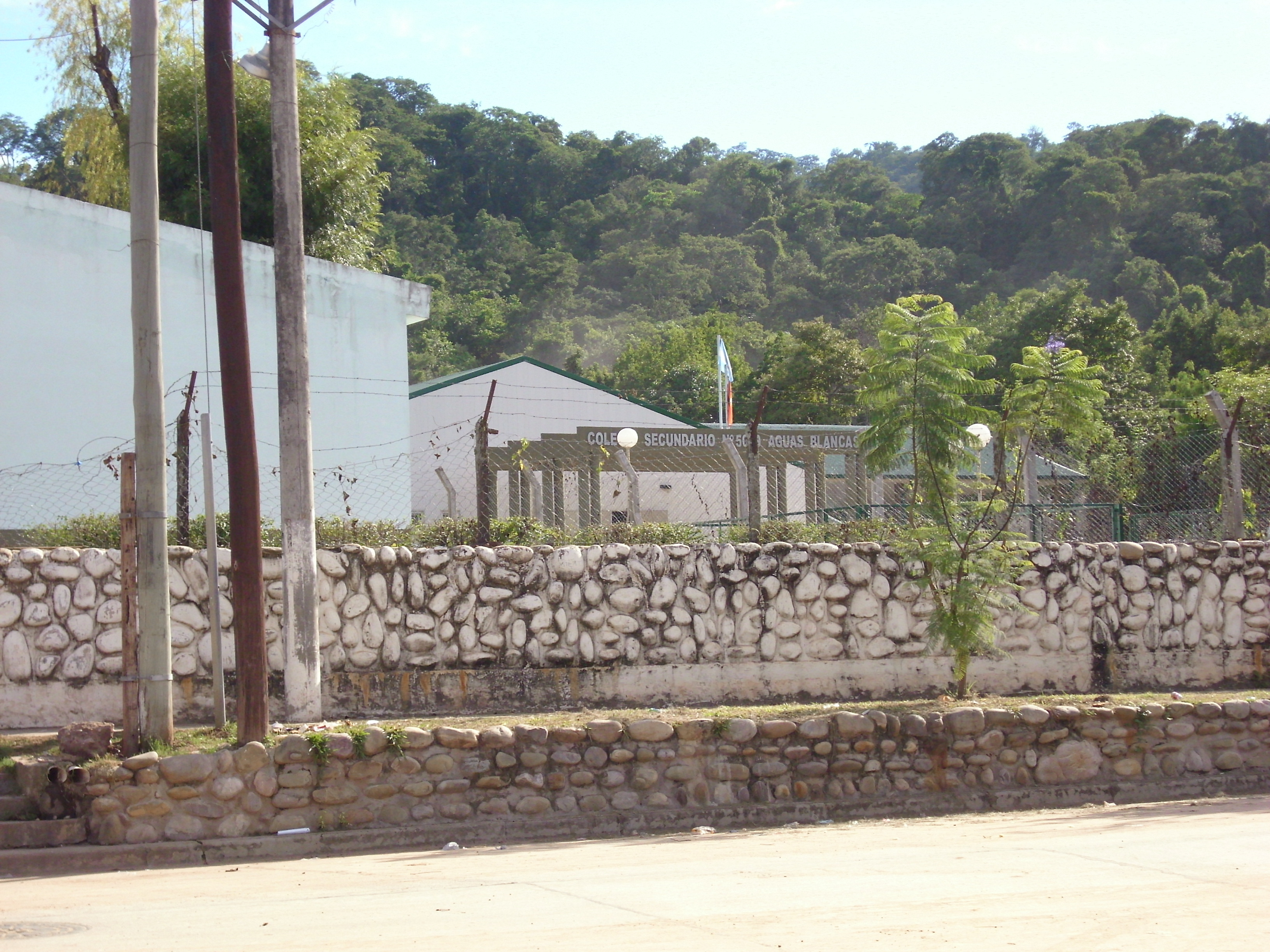
- Secondary School 5059 - Aguas Blancas - Oran - panoramio.jpg

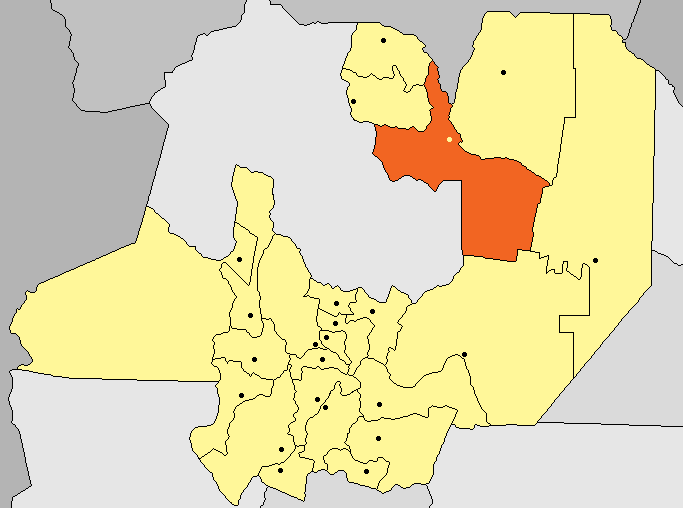
- Country: Argentina
- Province: Salta Province
- Established: 23 April 1912

Population (2001)
  - Total: 1,403
- Time zone: UTC−3 (ART)
- Postal code: J4531
- Area code: 03878
- Climate: Cwb

Aguas Blancas (Salta) is a village and rural municipality in Salta Province in northwestern Argentina. It is a city in the Oran department, located northeast of the province of Salta, Argentina. Aguas Blancas is located on the right bank of the Bermejo River, which forms a natural boundary between Argentina and Bolivia. The city Bermejo, Bolivia is on the opposite bank of the river.

It has a cluster of farms with novelty horticultural crops and high-value fruits which it exports. These include orange, grapefruit, lemon, mango, papaya, banana, green pepper, tomato, watermelon, pumpkin, melon, strawberry, sweet potato, cassava, and coffee.

== Climate ==
Climate data for Aguas Blancas (1964–1990)
Month	Jan	Feb	Mar	Apr	May	Jun	Jul	Aug	Sep	Oct	Nov	Dec	Year
Daily mean °C (°F)	26.2 (79.2)	25.2 (77.4)	24.1 (75.4)	21.4 (70.5)	19.1 (66.4)	15.9 (60.6)	15.8 (60.4)	17.5 (63.5)	20.0 (68.0)	23.6 (74.5)	24.7 (76.5)	26.0 (78.8)	21.6 (70.9)
Average precipitation mm (inches)	253 (10.0)	226 (8.9)	227 (8.9)	94 (3.7)	42 (1.7)	12 (0.5)	11 (0.4)	9 (0.4)	15 (0.6)	60 (2.4)	120 (4.7)	204 (8.0)	1,273 (50.1)
Source: Instituto Nacional de Tecnología Agropecuaria
