= Agua Blanca, Oaxaca =

Agua Blanca is a small beach town on the Pacific coast in Oaxaca, Mexico. It can be accessed via an unsurfaced road that exits at KM 171 on highway 200 between Puerto Escondido and Puchutla.

The community consists of about roughly 25 beach palapa restaurants serving locally caught seafood. As of 2008 there was no lodging available for rent in the area. Locals use both lines and nets to catch yellowtail amberjack, skipjack tuna, and agujon off the beach, and the rocky shoreline is also popular for oyster divers and lobster fisherman.

Olive ridley and leatherback sea turtles nest on the western end of the beach and their eggs are often collected by the locals to protect them from predators until they hatch and can be released.

Agua Blanca is popular with Mexican tourists during the Christmas holiday and Semana Santa periods, but is relatively unvisited by the foreign tourists who flock to nearby Puerto Escondido.

15.92485°N 96.84332°W
