= Whitewater Township, Cape Girardeau County, Missouri =

Inactive township in the US state of Missouri

Whitewater Township
- Township
- Coordinates: 37°27′10″N 089°48′16″W
- Country: United States
- State: Missouri
- County: Cape Girardeau

Area
  - Total: 36.50 sq mi (94.54 km^{2})
  - Land: 36.45 sq mi (94.41 km^{2})
  - Water: 0.050 sq mi (0.13 km^{2}) 0.14%
- Elevation: 443 ft (135 m)

Population (2000)
  - Total: 1,263
  - Density: 35/sq mi (13.4/km^{2})
- FIPS code: 29-79630
- GNIS feature ID: 0766404

Whitewater Township is one of ten townships in Cape Girardeau County, Missouri, USA. As of the 2000 census, its population was 1,263.

== History ==
Whitewater Township was founded in 1852. The township took its name from the Whitewater River.

== Geography ==
Whitewater Township covers an area of 36.5 square miles (95 km^{2}) and contains no incorporated settlements. Known cemeteries include Baker, Bollinger Family Cemetery at Bollinger Mill, Born, Caney Fork – New and Old, Estes, Ferguson, Gladish, Kurre, Kurreville/Maintz, Limbaugh, Mayfield, Miller at Millersville, Niswonger New and Old, Old Salem Methodist, Riehn, Schmidt, Snider, Wilkerson 1 and 2, Wise.

The streams of Caney Fork, Crawford Creek, Dry Creek, Little Muddy Creek, Panther Creek, Sandy Branch and Wolf Creek run through this township.

== Education ==
It is in the Delta R-V School District.
