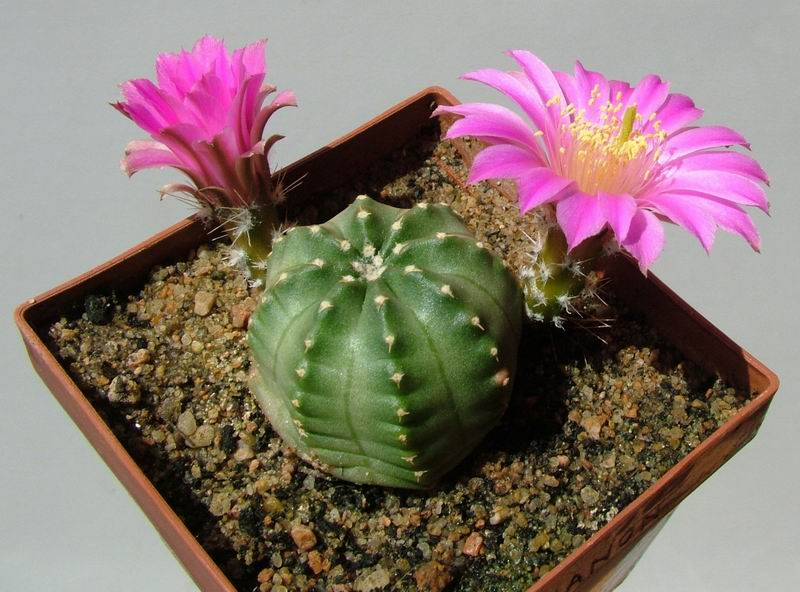

Conservation status
- Vulnerable (IUCN 3.1)

Scientific classification
- Kingdom: Plantae
- Clade: Tracheophytes
- Clade: Angiosperms
- Clade: Eudicots
- Order: Caryophyllales
- Family: Cactaceae
- Subfamily: Cactoideae
- Genus: Echinocereus
- Species: E. pulchellus

Binomial name
- Echinocereus pulchellus (Mart.) K.Schum. 1894

Synonyms
- Echinocactus pulchellus Mart. 1832; Cereus amoena (A.Dietr.) Hemsl. 1880; Cereus pulchellus Pfeiff. 1837; Echinocereus amoenus (A.Dietr.) F.A.C.Weber ex F.Haage 1892; Echinocereus pulchellus var. amoenus (A.Dietr.) K.Schum. 1897; Echinocereus pulchellus subsp. sladkovskyi Halda & Kupčák 2000; Echinonyctanthus pulchellus (Pfeiff.) Lem. 1839; Echinopsis amoena A.Dietr. 1844; Echinopsis pulchella Zucc. ex C.F.Först. 1846; Echinopsis pulchella var. amoena (A.Dietr.) C.F.Först. 1846

= Echinocereus pulchellus =

Species of cactus

Echinocereus pulchellus is a species of cactus native to Mexico.

== Description ==
Echinocereus pulchellus typically grows alone, shrinking during the dry season and retreating underground. Its blue-green spherical shoots range from 2 to 13 cm (0.79 to 5.12 in) in length and have the same diameter, with thickened roots. The plant has nine to 17 widely spaced, slightly tuberculated ribs. It has three to 14 radial spines that are yellowish to whitish, darkening with age, and are 0.1 to 1 cm (0.039 to 0.394 in) long. The broadly funnel-shaped flowers are pink to magenta or white, appearing on the sides of the shoots. They are 3 to 6 cm (1.2 to 2.4 in) long and up to 8 cm (3.1 in) in diameter. The small spherical fruits are nearly dry when ripe and contain only a few seeds.

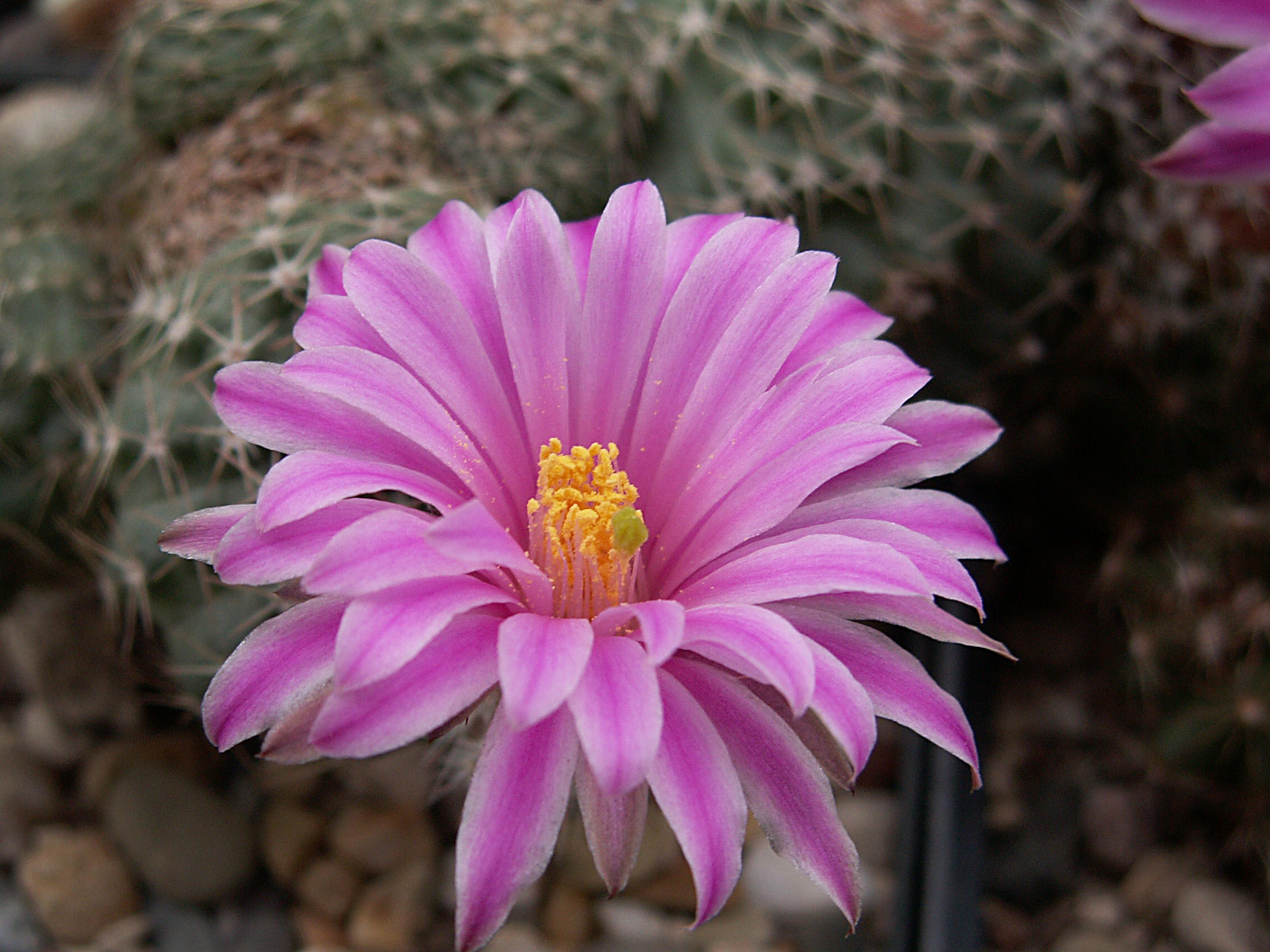
Flower

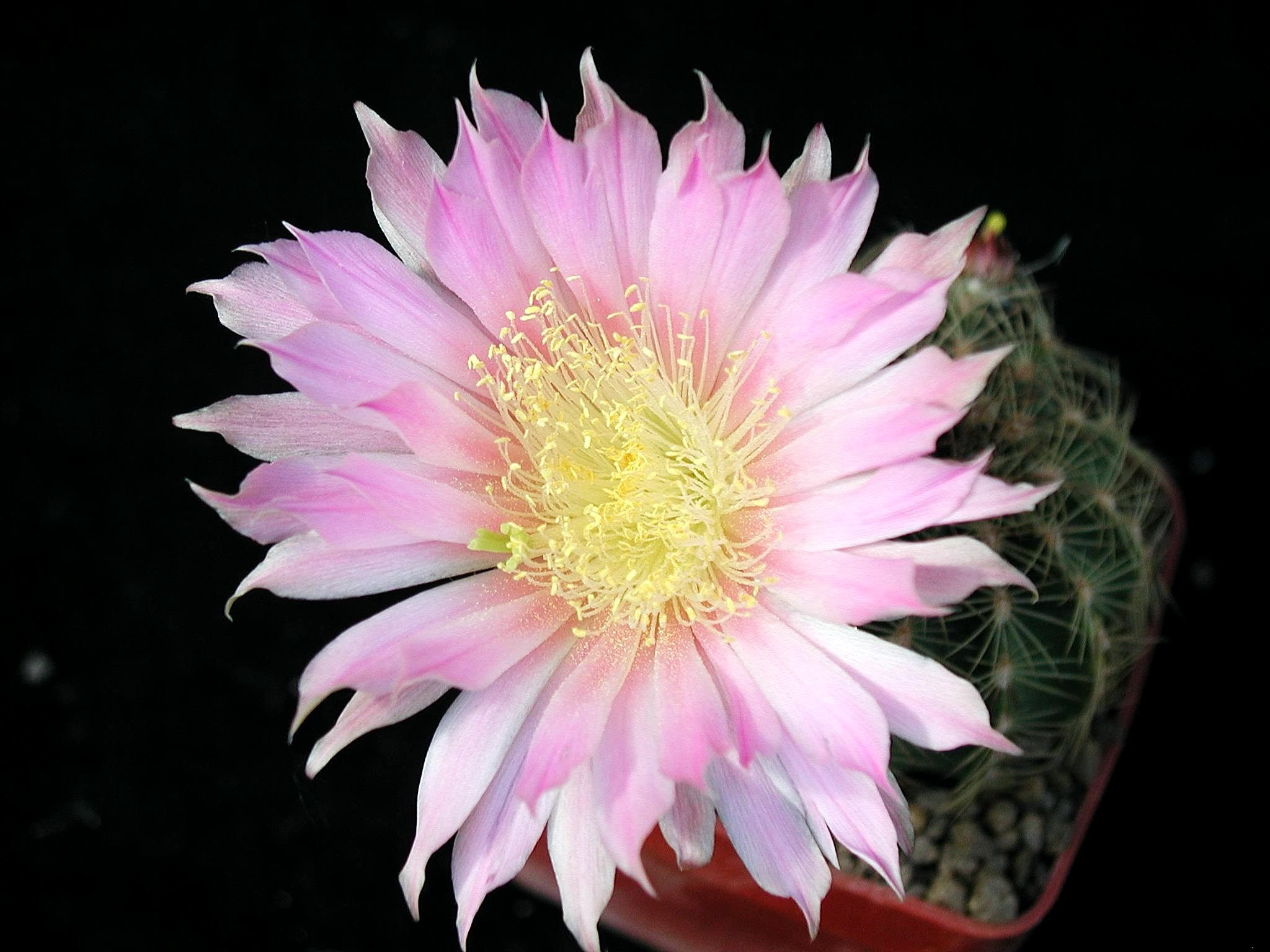
Flower

== Distribution ==
Echinocereus pulchellus is found in the Mexican states of Oaxaca, Hidalgo, Querétaro, San Luis Potosí, Zacatecas, and Nuevo León, growing on grassy patches at altitudes of 1800 to 2400 meters. Despite its large distribution area, populations are limited to narrow habitats.

== Taxonomy ==
Originally described as Echinocactus pulchellus by Carl Friedrich Philipp von Martius in 1832, the specific epithet pulchellus derives from the Latin word pulcher, meaning 'pretty'.
