= Aguas Blancas Dam =

Coordinates: 34.5067489°S 55.3733961°W

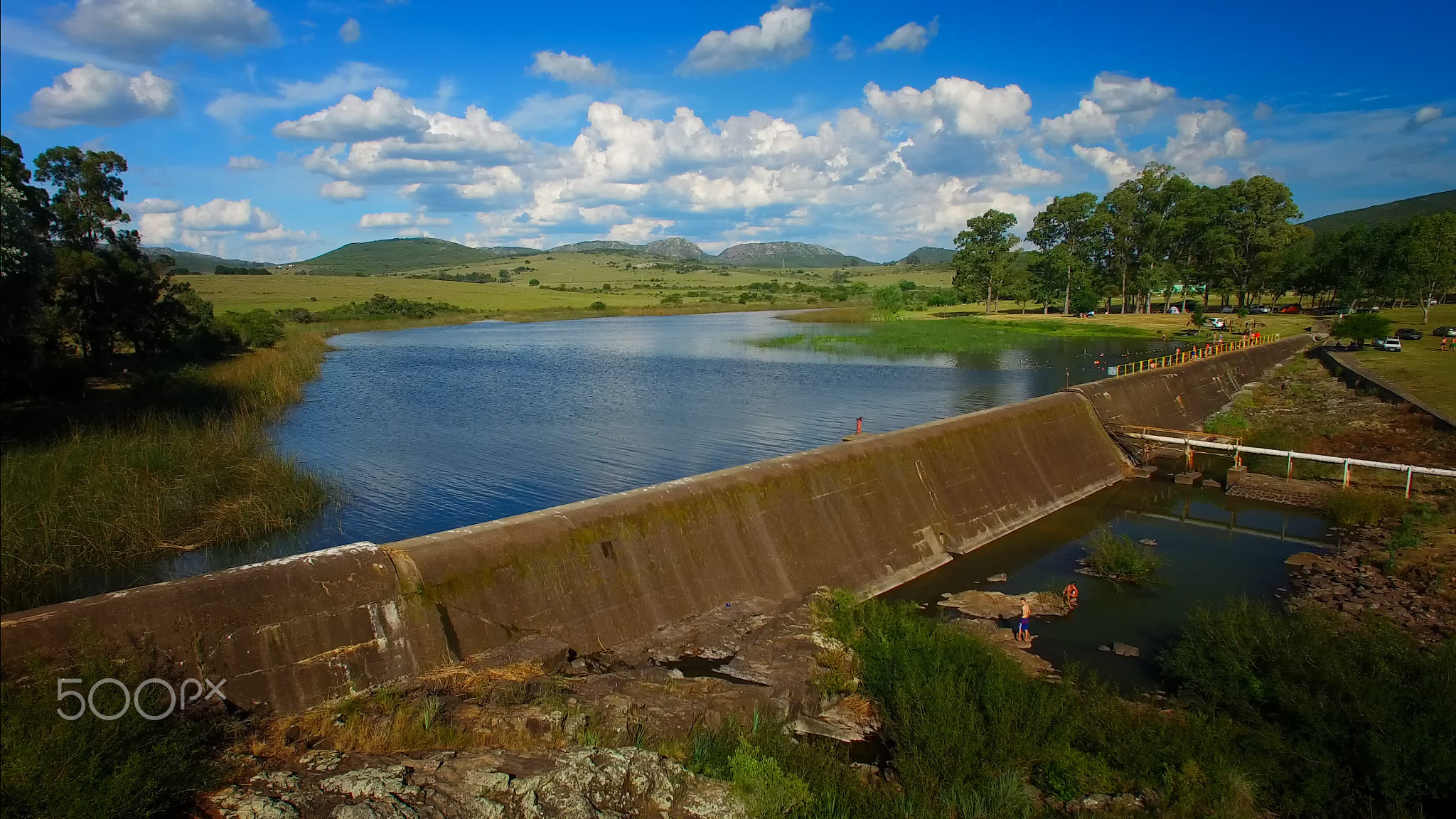
- Aguas Blancas in 2015.
- Country: Uruguay

The Aguas Blancas Dam, once known as the Basso Dam, is a dam located in Lavalleja, Uruguay. It is located in the Aguas Blancas area of the Abra de Zabaleta mountains, accessible via Route No. 81, which can be reached from kilometer 91 of Route No. 8 or from Route No. 60.

The dam is built on the Mataojo stream, with the purpose of irrigating fruit farms in the area.

On December 19, 1943, in the presence of President Juan José de Amézaga, national authorities, municipal officials, and farmers, an artificial irrigation service was established. This spanned 565 hectares, for which a reservoir of 118,000 m^{3} was calculated. The largest apple establishment in the country was operated in the area.

== Region ==
The dam is located in Aguas Blancas National Park, adjoining a camping area administered by the Municipality of Lavalleja. In the vicinity of the dam, there is a Salesian convent of nuns that occupies the site of the first mill that generated hydropower in the country. The mill was established by an immigrant, Enrique Ladós, in 1860.

At the top of the hill is the Virgen Blanca Chapel.

Also near the dam is the Sengue Dzong Temple, a temple of Vajrayāna Buddhism (also known as Tibetan Buddhism).
