= Rapid Creek (Iowa River tributary) =

Stream in Johnson County, Iowa, U.S.

Coordinates: 41.6975157°N 91.5387806°W

Rapid Creek is a stream in Johnson County, Iowa, in the United States. It is a tributary of the Iowa River.

Rapid Creek was so named on account of its fast-moving waters.

== See also ==
- List of rivers of Iowa
