= List of minerals recognized by the International Mineralogical Association (U–V) =

This list includes those recognised minerals beginning with the letters U and V. The International Mineralogical Association is the international group that recognises new minerals and new mineral names; however, minerals discovered before 1959 did not go through the official naming procedure, although some minerals published previously have been either confirmed or discredited since that date. This list contains a mixture of mineral names that have been approved since 1959 and those mineral names believed to still refer to valid mineral species (these are called "grandfathered" species).

The list is divided into groups:

- Introduction • (Main synonyms)
- A • B • C • D • E • F • G • H • I • J • K • L • M • N • O • P–Q • R • S • T • U–V • W–X • Y–Z

The data was exported from mindat.org on 29 April 2005; updated up to 'IMA2021'.

The minerals are sorted by name, followed by the structural group (rruff.info/ima and ima-cnmnc by mineralienatlas.de, mainly) or chemical class (mindat.org and basics), the year of publication (if it's before of an IMA approval procedure), the IMA approval and the Strunz-mindat code. The first link is to mindat.org, the second link is to webmineral.com, and the third is to the Handbook of Mineralogy (Mineralogical Society of America).

- Abbreviations:
  - ^{D} – discredited (IMA/CNMNC status).
  - ^{Q} – questionable/ doubtful (IMA/CNMNC, mindat.org or mineralienatlas.de status).
  - ^{N} – published without approval of the IMA/CNMNC, or just not an IMA approved mineral but with some acceptance in the scientific community nowadays.
  - ^{I} – intermediate member of a solid-solution series.
  - ^{H} – hypothetical mineral (synthetic, anthropogenic, suspended approval procedure, etc.)
    - ^{ch} – incomplete description, hypothetical solid solution end member.
  - Rd – redefinition of ...
  - "s.p." – special procedure.
  - group – a name used to designate a group of species, sometimes only a mineral group name.
  - no – no link available.
  - IUPAC – chemical name.
  - Y: NNNN – year of publication.
  - Y: old – known before publications were available.

== U ==
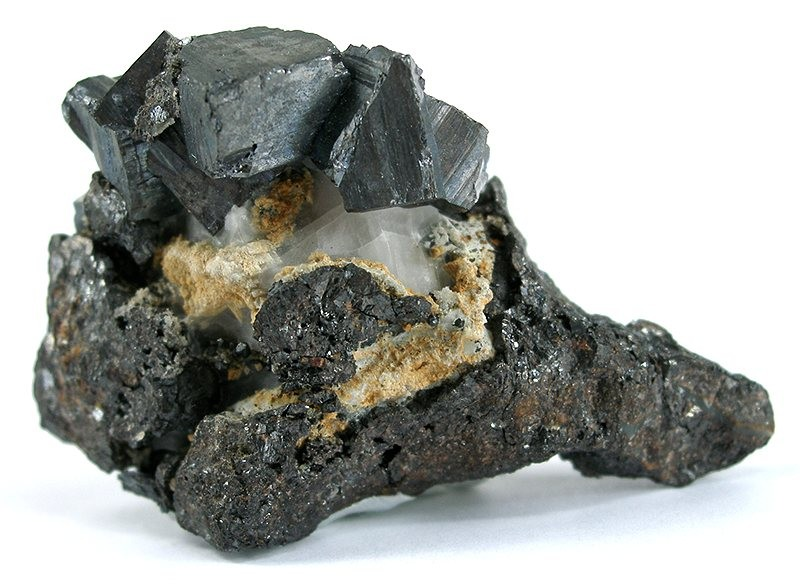
Ullmannite from Masaloni Mine, San Vito, Cagliari Province, Sardinia, Italy

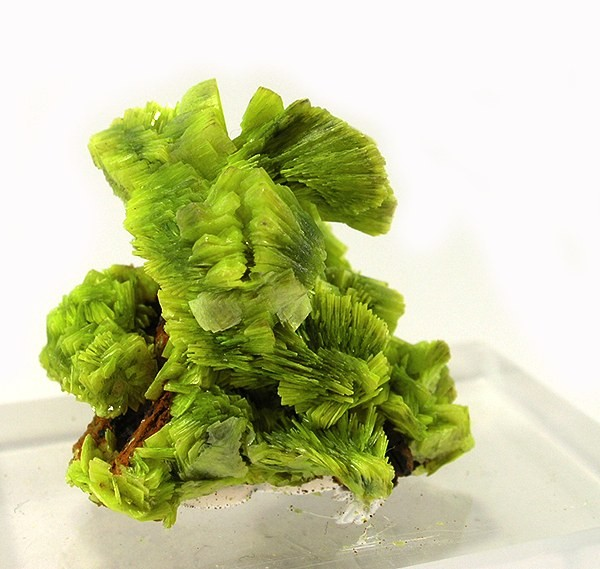
Uranocircite. São Pedro claim, Malacacheta, Mucuri valley, Minas Gerais, Southeast Region, Brazil

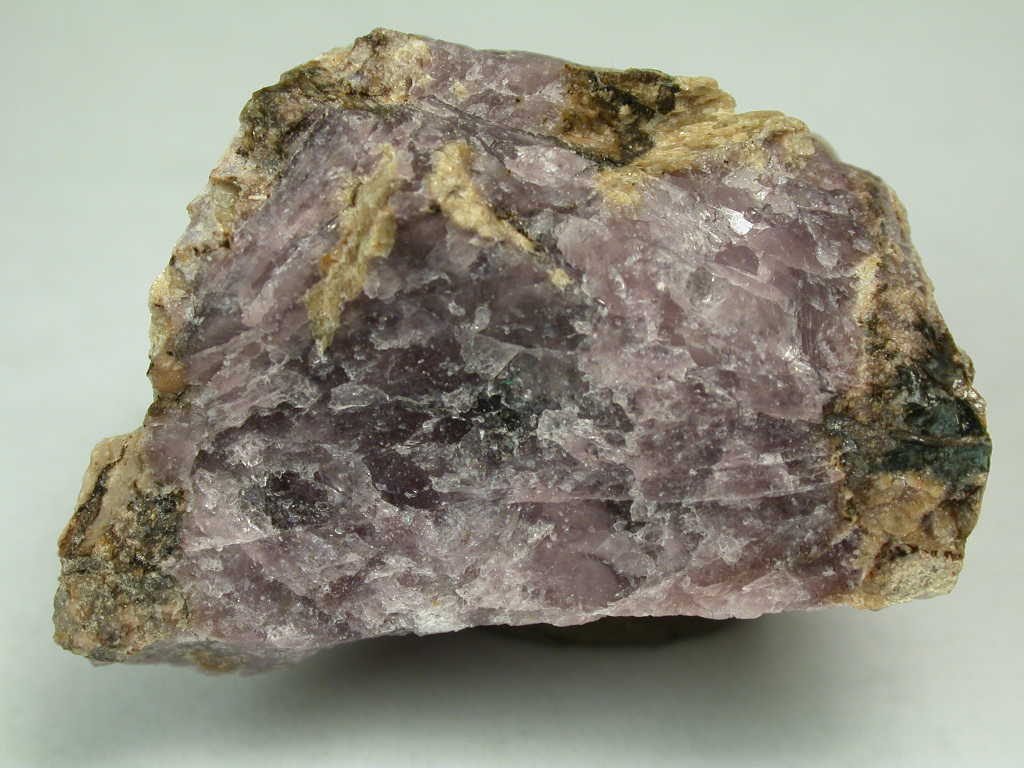
Ussingite from Shkatulka pegmatite, Umbozero mine (Umbozerskii mine), Alluaiv Mt, Lovozero Massif, Kola Peninsula, Murmanskaja Oblast', Northern Region, Russia

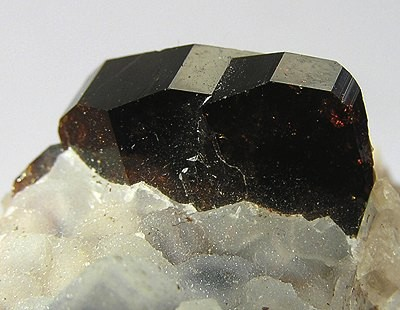
Uvite on quartz. Serra das Éguas, Brumado (Bom Jesus dos Meiras), Bahia, Northeast Region, Brazil

1. Uakitite (nitride, rocksalt: IMA2018-003) 1.0 [no] [no]
2. Uchucchacuaite (lillianite: IMA1981-007) 2.JB.40a
  (AgMnPb_{3}Sb_{5}S_{12})
3. Udinaite (IMA2018-066) 8.0 [no] [no]
  (IUPAC: sodium tetramagnesium trivanadate)
4. Uduminelite^{Q} (Y: 1950) 8.DM.30 [no] [no]
5. Uedaite-(Ce) (epidote: IMA2006-022) 9.BG.05
6. Uklonskovite (IMA1967 s.p., 1964) 7.DF.05
7. Ulexite (Y: 1850) 6.EA.25
  (IUPAC: sodium calcium hexahydro hexaoxopentaborate pentahydrate)
8. Ulfanderssonite-(Ce) (IMA2016-107) 9.0 [no] [no]
9. Ullmannite (ullmannite: 1843) 2.EB.25
  (IUPAC: nickel sulfantimonide)
10. Ulrichite (IMA1988-006) 8.EA.15
11. Ulvöspinel (spinel, spinel: 1946) 4.BB.05
  (IUPAC: diiron(II) titanum tetraoxide)
12. Umangite (Y: 1891) 2.BA.25
  (IUPAC: tricopper diselenide)
13. Umbite (umbite: IMA1982-006) 9.DG.25
14. Umbozerite (IMA1973-039) 9.HG.15
15. Umbrianite (phyllosilicate: IMA2011-074) 9.E?. [no] [no]
16. Umohoite (Y: 1953) 4.GC.10
  (IUPAC: uranyl molybdate dihydrate)
17. Ungavaite (IMA2004-020) 2.AC.35b
  (IUPAC: tetrapalladium triantimonide)
18. Ungemachite (Y: 1938) 7.DG.10
  (IUPAC: tripotassium octasodium iron(III) hexasulfate dinitrate hexahydrate)
19. Upalite (IMA1978-045) 8.EC.05
  (IUPAC: aluminium triuranyl oxyhydro diphosphate heptahydrate)
20. Uralborite (Y: 1961, 1967 s.p.) 6.DA.35
  (IUPAC: calcium tetrahydro dioxodiborate)
21. Uralolite (Y: 1964) 8.DA.15
22. Uramarsite (meta-autunite: IMA2005-043) 8.EB.15
  (IUPAC: ammonium uranyl arsenate trihydrate)
23. Uramphite (natroautunite: 1957) 8.EB.15
  (IUPAC: ammonium uranyl phosphate trihydrate)
24. Urancalcarite (IMA1983-052) 5.EA.10
  (IUPAC: calcium triuranyl hexahydro carbonate trihydrate)
25. Uranoclite (IMA2020-074) 4.0 [no] [no]
26. Uraninite (fluorite: 1845) 4.DL.05
  (IUPAC: uranium dioxide)
27. Uranocircite (Y: 1877) 8.EB.05 [no] [no]
  (IUPAC: barium diuranyl diphosphate decahydrate)
28. Uranophane (Y: 1853) 9.AK.15
  (IUPAC: calcium diuranyl di(hydrotrioxosilicate) pentahydrate)
29. Uranopilite (Y: 1882) 7.EA.05
  (IUPAC: hexauranyl dioxyhexahydro sulfate tetradecahydrate)
30. Uranopolycrase (columbite: IMA1990-046) 4.DG.05
31. Uranosilite (IMA1981-066) 9.AK.40
32. Uranospathite (Y: 1915) 8.EB.25
33. Uranosphaerite (Y: 1873) 4.GB.65
  (IUPAC: bismuth uranyl hydro dioxide)
34. Uranospinite (Y: 1873) 8.EB.05
  (IUPAC: calcium diuranyl diarsenate decahydrate)
35. Uranotungstite (IMA1984-005) 7.HB.25
  (IUPAC: iron diuranyl tetrahydro tungstanate dodecahydrate)
36. Urea (IMA1972-031) 10.CA.35
37. Uricite (IMA1973-055) 10.CA.40
  (IUPAC: uric acid)
38. Uroxite (hydrous uranyl oxalate: IMA2018-100) 10.AB. [no] [no]
39. Ursilite (Y: 1957) 9.AK.35 [no]
40. Urusovite (IMA1998-067) 8.BB.60 [no]
  (IUPAC: copper aluminium oxoarsenate)
41. Urvantsevite (IMA1976-025) 2.EB.30
  (Pd(Bi,Pb)_{2})
42. Ushkovite (laueite, laueite: IMA1982-014) 8.DC.30
  (IUPAC: magnesium diiron(III) dihydro diphosphate octahydrate)
43. Usovite (IMA1966-038) 3.CB.35
  (IUPAC: dibarium calcium magnesium tetradecafluorodialuminate)
44. Ussingite (Y: 1915) 9.EH.20
45. Ustarasite^{Q} (Y: 1955) 2.JB.40e
46. Usturite (garnet: IMA2009-053) 4.0 [no] [no]
  (IUPAC: tricalcium (antimony zirconium) tri(iron(III) tetraoxide))
47. Utahite (tellurium oxysalt: IMA1995-039) 7.DE.25
  (IUPAC: pentacopper trizinc octahydro tetra(tetraoxotellurate(VI)) heptahydrate)
48. Uvanite^{Q} (Y: 1914) 4.HB.35
49. Uvarovite (garnet, garnet: IMA1967 s.p., 1832) 9.AD.25
  (IUPAC: tricalcium dichromium tri(tetraoxysilicate))
50. Uvite (tourmaline: IMA2019-113) 9.CK. [no] [no]
51. Uytenbogaardtite (IMA1977-018) 2.BA.75
  (IUPAC: trisilver gold disulfide)
52. Uzonite (IMA1984-027) 2.FA.25
  (IUPAC: tetrarsenic pentasulfide)

== V ==
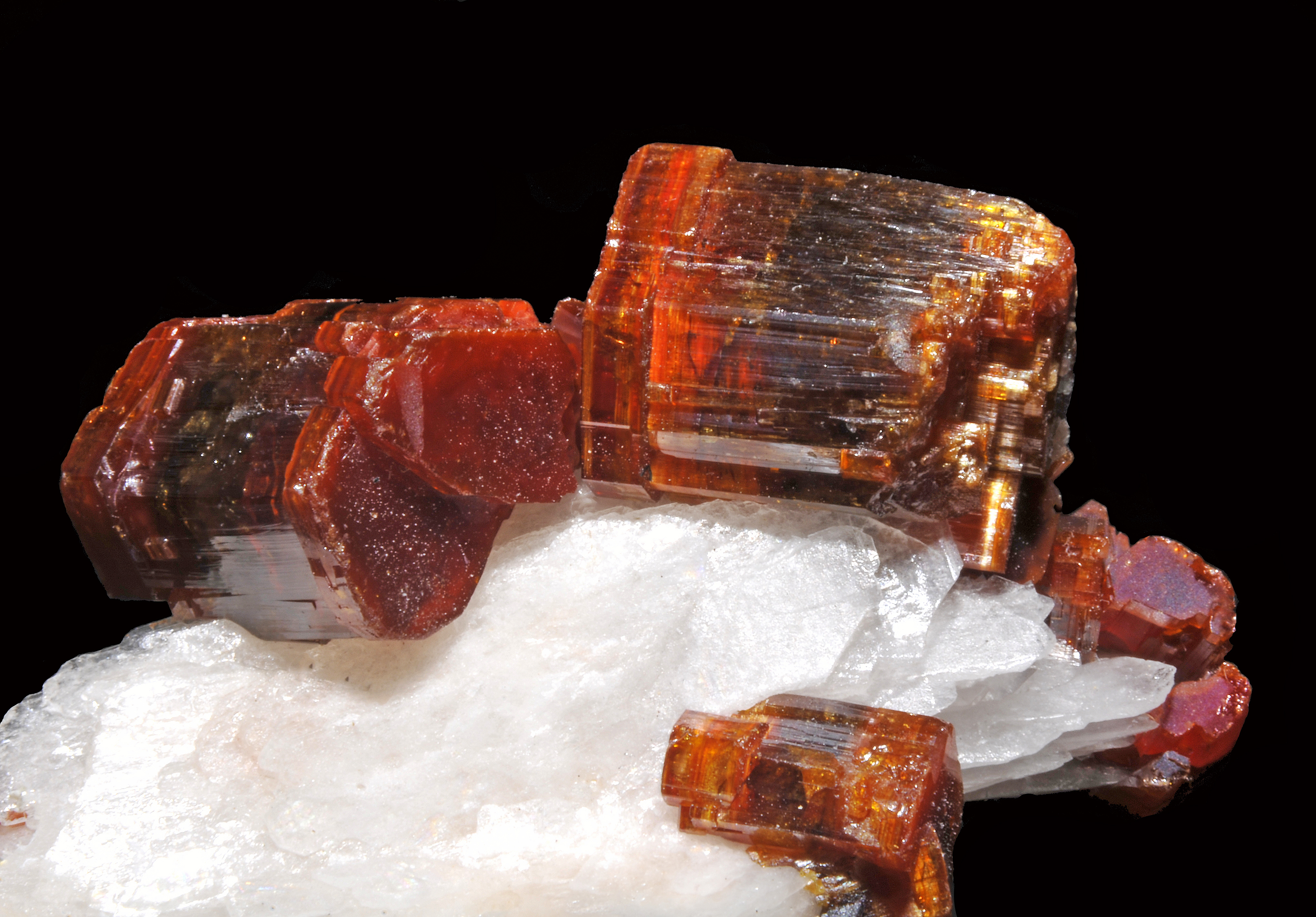
Vanadinite on baryte, from Mibladene, Upper Moulouya lead district, Midelt, Khénifra Province, Meknès-Tafilalet Region, Morocco

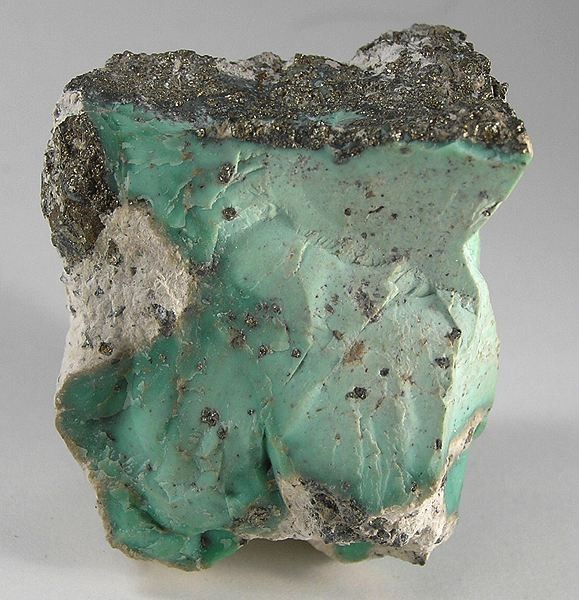
Variscite from Cole Mine (Cole shaft; Cole No. 3), Bisbee, Warren District, Mule Mts, Cochise County, Arizona, USA

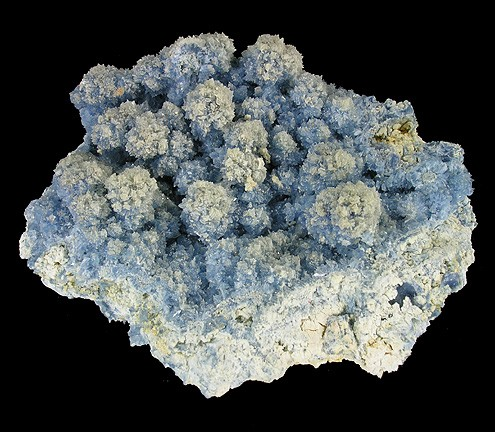
Vauxite from Siglo Veinte Mine (Siglo XX Mine; Llallagua Mine; Catavi), Llallagua, Rafael Bustillo Province, Potosí Department, Bolivia

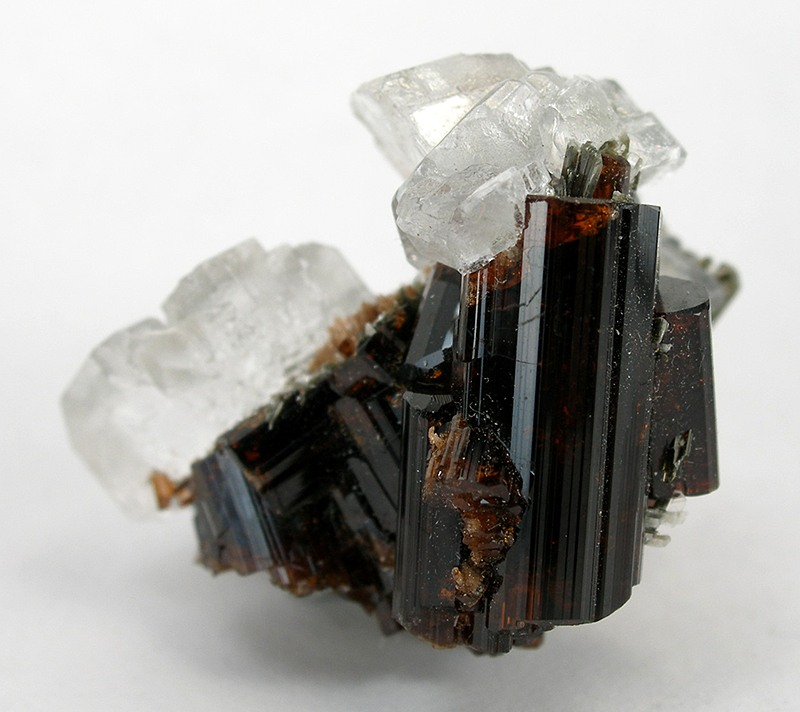
Vesuvianite with calcite

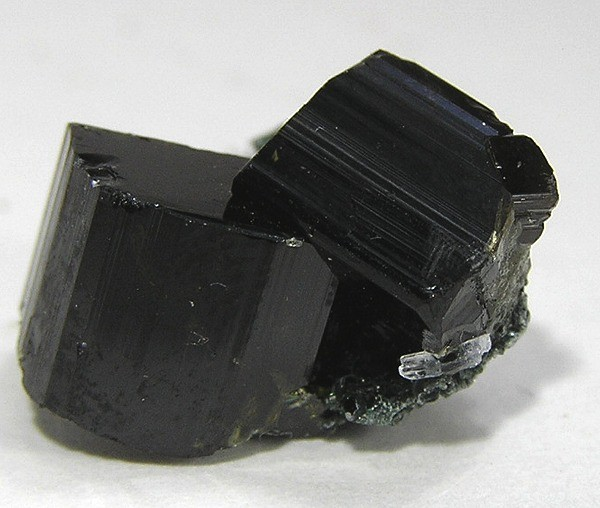
Vesuvianite - Bellecombe, Châtillon, Aosta Valley, Italy

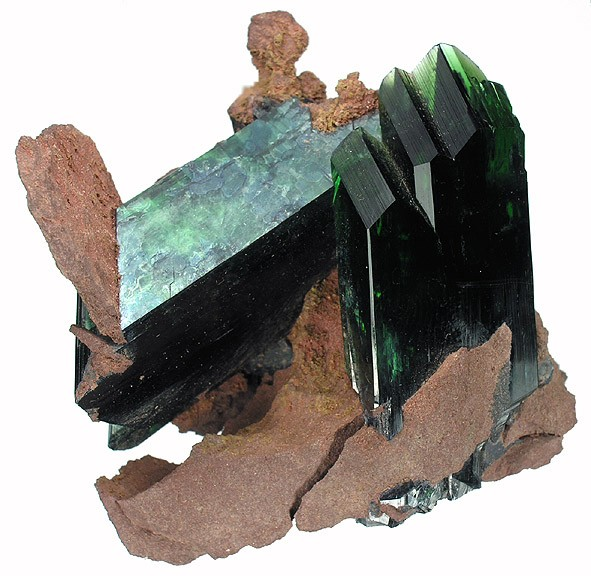
Vivianite - Tomokoni mine, Machacamarca District (Colavi District), Cornelio Saavedra Province, Potosí Department, Bolivia

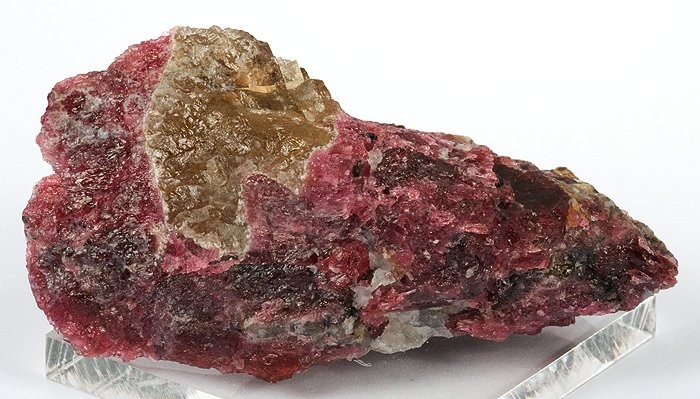
Golden-amber vlasovite crystal within cherry-red eudialyte matrix

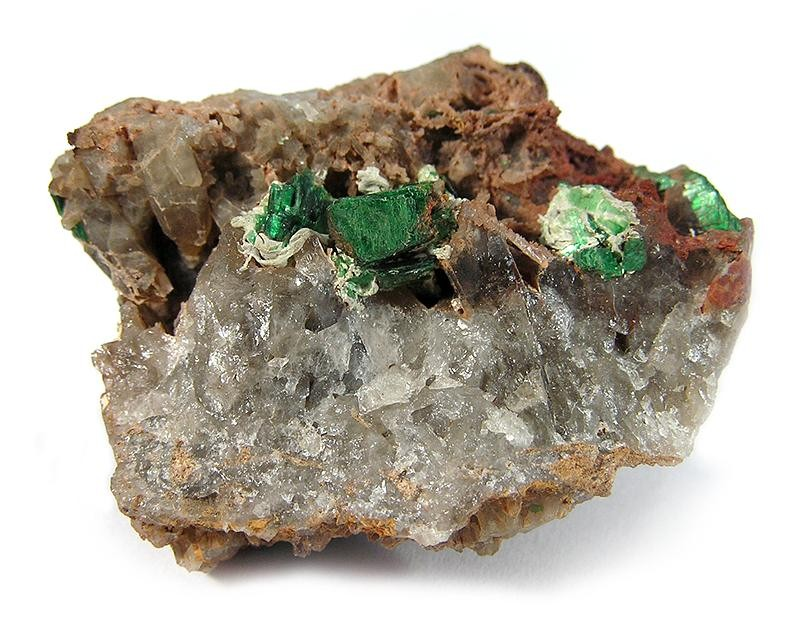
Neon green crystals of volborthite are nestled in a vug in the matrix.

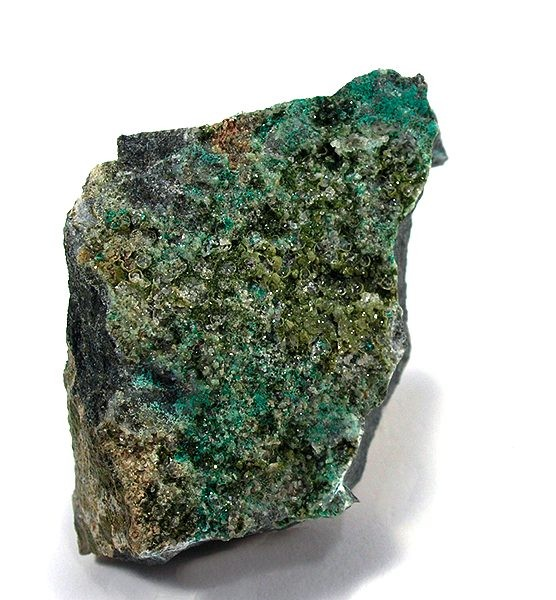
Vuagnatite from Copper King Mine, Red Mountain, Red Mountain District, Mendocino County, California, USA

1. Vaesite (pyrite: 1945) 2.EB.05a
  (IUPAC: nickel disulfide)
2. Vajdakite (IMA1998-031) 4.JC.20 [no]
  (IUPAC: di(dioxomolybdate(VI)) diarsenic(III) pentaoxide trihydrate)
3. Valentinite (IMA1980 s.p., 1845) 4.CB.55
  (IUPAC: diantimony trioxide)
4. Valleriite (valleriite: 1871) 2.FD.30
5. Valleyite (sodalite: IMA2017-026) 4.0 [no] [no]
  (IUPAC: tetracalcium hexairon tridecaoxide)
6. Vanackerite (apatite: IMA2011-114) 8.0 [no] [no]
  (IUPAC: tetralead cadmium (chloro,hydro) triarsenate)
7. Vanadinite (apatite: 1838) 8.BN.05
  (IUPAC: pentalead chloro trivanadate)
8. Vanadiocarpholite (carpholite: IMA2003-055) 9.DB.05 [no]
  (IUPAC: manganese(II) vanadium(III) aluminium hexaoxodisilicate tetrahydroxyl)
9. Vanadio-oxy-chromium-dravite (tourmaline: IMA2012-034) 9.CK. [no] [no]
10. Vanadio-oxy-dravite (tourmaline: IMA2012-074) 9.CK. [no] [no]
11. Vanadiopargasite (Ca-amphibole: IMA2017-019) 9.D [no] [no]
12. Vanadium (iron: IMA2012-021a) 1.AE. [no] [no]
13. Vanadoallanite-(La) (epidote: IMA2012-095) 9.B?. [no] [no]
14. Vanadoandrosite-(Ce) (epidote, allanite: IMA2004-015) 9.BG.05
15. Vanadomalayaite (titanite: IMA1993-032) 9.AG.15 [no]
  (IUPAC: calcium vanadium oxy(tetraoxysilicate))
16. Vanalite (IMA1967 s.p., 1962) 4.HG.15
17. Vanarsite (polyoxometalate: IMA2014-031) 4.0 [no] [no]
18. Vandenbrandeite (Y: 1932) 4.GB.45
  (IUPAC: copper uranyl tetrahydroxide)
19. Vandendriesscheite (Y: 1947) 4.GB.40
20. Vanderheydenite (IMA2014-076) 8.0 [no] [no]
  (IUPAC: hexazinc diphosphate tetrahydro sulfate heptahydrate)
21. Vandermeerscheite (IMA2017-104) 8.0 [no] [no]
22. Vaniniite (IMA2017-116) 8.0 [no] [no]
23. Vanmeersscheite (IMA1981-009) 8.EC.20
24. Vanoxite^{Q} (Y: 1925) 4.HG.25
  (IUPAC: tetravanadium(IV) divanadium(V) tridecaoxide octahydrate)
25. Vantasselite (IMA1986-016) 8.DC.37
  (IUPAC: tetraluminium trihydro triphosphate nonahydrate)
26. Vanthoffite (Y: 1902) 7.AC.05
  (IUPAC: hexasodium magnesium tetrasulfate)
27. Vanuralite (IMA1967 s.p., 1963) 4.HB.20
  (IUPAC: aluminium diuranyl hydro divanadate (8.5)hydrate)
28. Vapnikite (double perovskite: IMA2013-082) 4.00. [no]
  (IUPAC: dicalcium calcium uranium hexaoxide)
29. Varennesite (IMA1994-017) 9.EE.50 [no]
30. Vargite (IMA2020-051) 8.DD. [no] [no]
31. Variscite (IMA1967 s.p., 1837) 8.CD.10
  (IUPAC: aluminium phosphate dihydrate)
32. Varlamoffite^{Q} (rutile: 1947) 4.DB.05 [no] [no]
  Note: possibly a variety of cassiterite.
33. Varulite (alluaudite: Rd 2019, 1937) 8.AC.10
  (IUPAC: disodium manganese (manganese iron(III)) triphosphate)
34. Vashegyite (Y: 1909) 8.DB.10
  (IUPAC: undecaaluminium hexahydro nonaphosphate octatriacontahydrate)
35. Vasilite (IMA1989-044) 2.BC.25
  ((Pd,Cu)_{16}(S,Te)_{7})
36. Vasilseverginite (IMA2015-083) 8.0 [no] [no]
  (IUPAC: nonacopper tetraoxodiarsenate disulfate)
37. Vasilyevite (IMA2003-016) 3.DD.45 [no]
  (IUPAC: deca(dimercury) hexaoxide triodine diboron chloro carbonate)
38. Västmanlandite-(Ce) (gatelite: IMA2002-025) 9.BG.55 [no]
39. Vaterite (IMA1962 s.p., 1911) 5.AB.20
  (IUPAC: anhydrous calcium carbonate)
40. Vaughanite (IMA1987-055) 2.LA.20
  (TlHgSb_{4}S_{7})
41. Vauquelinite (Y: 1818) 7.FC.05
  (IUPAC: copper dilead hydro chromate phosphate)
42. Vauxite (Y: 1922) 8.DC.35
  (IUPAC: iron(II) dialumium dihydro diphosphate hexahydrate)
43. Vavřínite (IMA2005-045) 2.CC.30 [no]
  (IUPAC: dinickel antimonide ditelluride)
44. Väyrynenite (Y: 1954) 8.BA.05
  (IUPAC: beryllium manganese(II) hydro phosphate)
45. Veatchite (Y: 1938) 6.EC.15
46. Veblenite (veblenite (Si_{8}O_{22}) ribbon: IMA2010-050) 9.0 [no] [no]
47. Veenite (IMA1966-016) 2.HC.05d
  (IUPAC: dilead diantimonide pentasulfide)
48. Velikite (stannite: IMA1996-052) 2.CB.15a
  (IUPAC: dicopper mercury tetrasulfa stannide)
49. Vendidaite (IMA2012-089) 7.0 [no] [no]
  (IUPAC: dialuminium trihydro chloro sulfate hexahydrate)
50. Verbeekite (IMA2001-005) 2.EA.25
  (IUPAC: lead diselenide)
51. Verbierite (humite: IMA2015-089) 4.0 [no] [no]
  (IUPAC: beryllium dichromium(III) titanium hexaoxide)
52. Vergasovaite (vergasovaite: IMA1998-009) 7.BB.30
  (IUPAC: tricopper oxomolybdate sulfate)
53. Vermiculite (smectite-vermiculite: 1824) 9.EC.50
54. Vernadite^{Q} (Y: 1937) 4.FE.40
  Note: possibly random-stacked birnessite.
55. Verneite (IMA2016-112) 3.0 [no] [no]
  (IUPAC: disodium tricalcium dialuminium tetradecafluoride)
56. Verplanckite (IMA1964-011) 9.CE.10
57. Versiliaite (IMA1978-068) 4.JA.30
58. Vertumnite (IMA1975-043) 9.EG.25
59. Veselovskýite (lindackerite: IMA2005-053) 8.CE.30 [no]
60. Vésigniéite (Y: 1955) 8.BH.45
  (IUPAC: tricopper barium dihydro divanadate)
61. Vestaite (IMA2017-068) 4. [no] [no]
62. Vesuvianite (vesuvianite: IMA1962 s.p., 1795) 9.BG.35
63. Veszelyite (Y: 1874) 8.DA.30
  (IUPAC: di(copper,zinc) zinc trihydro phosphate dihydrate)
64. Viaeneite (IMA1993-051) 2.FD.10
65. Vicanite-(Ce) (okanoganite: IMA1991-050) 9.AJ.35 [no]
66. Vigezzite (aeschnyite: IMA1977-008) 4.DF.05
67. Vigrishinite (seidozerite, murmanite: IMA2011-073) 9.B?. [no]
68. Vihorlatite (IMA1988-047) 2.DC.05 [no]
  (Bi_{24}Se_{17}Te_{4})
69. Viitaniemiite (IMA1977-043) 8.BL.15
  (IUPAC: sodium calcium aluminium trifluoro phosphate)
70. Vikingite (lillianite: IMA1976-006) 2.JB.40a
  (Ag_{5}Pb_{8}Bi_{13}S_{30})
71. Villamanínite (pyrite: IMA1989 s.p., 1920 Rd) 2.EB.05a
  (IUPAC: copper disulfide)
72. Villiaumite (halite, rocksalt: 1908) 3.AA.20
  (IUPAC: sodium fluoride)
73. Villyaellenite (hureaulite: IMA1983-008a) 8.CB.10
74. Vimsite (IMA1968-034) 6.BC.15
  (IUPAC: calcium dioxotetrahydro diborate)
75. Vincentite (IMA1973-051) 2.AC.05b
  (IUPAC: tripalladium arsenide)
76. Vinciennite (IMA1983-031) 2.CB.35a
  (Cu_{10}Fe_{4}SnAsS_{16})
77. Vinogradovite (Y: 1956) 9.DB.25
78. Violarite (spinel, linnaeite: 1889) 2.DA.05
  (IUPAC: iron(II) dinickel(III) tetrasulfide)
79. Virgilite (quartz: IMA1977-009) 9.FA.15
80. Vishnevite (cancrinite: 1944) 9.FB.05
  (IUPAC: octasodium (hexaluminohexasilicate) tetraicosaoxosulfate dihydrate)
81. Vismirnovite (schoenfliesite: IMA1980-029) 4.FC.10
  (IUPAC: zinc tin hexahydroxide)
82. Vistepite (IMA1991-012) 9.BD.25
  (IUPAC: tetramanganese tin dioxodiborate di(heptaoxodisilicate) dihydroxyl)
83. Viteite (IMA2019-040) 2.0 [no] [no]
84. Vitimite (IMA2001-057) 6.H0.45 [no]
  (IUPAC: hexacalcium [tetradecahydroxide|sulfate|nonadecaoxotetradecaborate] pentahydrate)
85. Vittinkiite (IMA2017-082a) 9.0 [no] [no]
  (MnMn_{3}MnSi_{5}O_{15})
86. Vitusite-(Ce) (IMA1976-055) 8.AC.35
  (IUPAC: trisodium cerium diphosphate)
87. Vivianite (vivianite: 1817) 8.CE.40
  (IUPAC: triiron(II) diphosphate octahydrate)
88. Vladimirite (IMA1964 s.p., 1953 Rd) 8.CJ.25
  (IUPAC: tetracalcium diarsenate hydroxoarsenate(V) tetrahydrate)
89. Vladimirivanovite (sodalite: IMA2010-070) 9.FB. [no]
90. Vladkrivovichevite (IMA2011-020) 3.D?. [no]
91. Vladykinite (IMA2011-052) 9.0 [no] [no]
  (IUPAC: trisodium tetrastrontium (iron(II) iron(III)) tetraicosaoxyctasiliate)
92. Vlasovite (IMA1967 s.p., 1961) 9.DM.25
  (IUPAC: disodium zirconium undecaoxotetrasilicate)
93. Vlodavetsite (IMA1993-023) 7.DF.40
  (IUPAC: dicalcium aluminium difluoro chloro disulfate tetrahydrate)
94. Vochtenite (IMA1987-047) 8.EB.30
95. Voggite (IMA1988-037) 8.DO.10
  (IUPAC: disodium zirconium hydro phosphate carbonate dihydrate)
96. Voglite (Y: 1853) 5.EE.05
  (IUPAC: dicalcium copper uranyl tetracarbonate hexahydrate)
97. Volaschioite (IMA2010-005) 7.DE.62 [no]
  (IUPAC: tetrairon dioxohexahydro sulfate dihydrate)
98. Volborthite (IMA1968 s.p., 1838) 8.FD.05
  (IUPAC: tricopper dihydro heptaoxodivanadate dihydrate)
99. Volkonskoite (montmorillonite, smectite: IMA1987 s.p., 1831 Rd) 9.EC.40
100. Volkovskite (IMA1968 s.p., 1966) 6.EC.20
101. Voloshinite (mica: IMA2007-052) 9.0 [no]
102. Voltaite (voltaite: 1841) 7.CC.25
  (IUPAC: dipotassium pentairon(II) triiron(III) aluminium dodecasulfate octadecahydrate)
103. Volynskite (IMA1968 s.p., 1966) 2.JA.20
  (IUPAC: silver bismuth ditelluride)
104. Vonbezingite (IMA1991-031) 7.DD.65
  (IUPAC: hexacalcium tricopper dodecahydro trisulfate dihydrate)
105. Vonsenite (ludwigite: 1920) 6.AB.30
  (IUPAC: diiron(II) iron(III) dioxo(trioxoborate))
106. Vorlanite (fluorite: IMA2009-032) 4.0 [no] [no]
  (IUPAC: calcium uranium(VI) tetraoxide)
107. Voronkovite (eudialyte: IMA2007-023) 9.CO.10 [no]
108. Vorontsovite (tennantite: IMA2016-076) 2.0 [no] [no]
  (IUPAC: (pentamercury copper) thallium dodecasulfa tetraarsenide)
109. Voudourisite (kieserite: IMA2012-042) 7.0 [no] [no]
  (IUPAC: cadmium sulfate monohydrate)
110. Vozhminite (IMA1981-040) 2.BB.05
  (IUPAC: tetranickel disulfarsenide)
111. Vránaite (anhydrous aluminoborosilicate: IMA2015-084) 9.0 [no] [no]
112. Vrbaite (Y: 1912) 2.HF.20
  (Hg_{3}Tl_{4}As_{8}Sb_{2}S_{20})
113. Vuagnatite (adelite: IMA1975-007) 9.AG.60
  (IUPAC: calcium aluminium hydrotetraoxysilicate)
114. Vulcanite (IMA1967 s.p., 1961) 2.CB.75
  (IUPAC: copper(I) telluride)
115. Vuonnemite (seidozerite, lamprophyllite: IMA1973-015) 9.BE.35
  (IUPAC: hexasodium disodium diniobium trisodium titanium di(heptaoxodisilicate) diphosphate dioxy(oxyfluoride))
116. Vuorelainenite (spinel, spinel: IMA1980-048) 4.BB.05
  (IUPAC: manganese(II) divanadium(III) tetraoxide)
117. Vuoriyarvite-K (labuntsovite: IMA1995-031) 9.CE.30b [no]
118. Vurroite (IMA2003-027) 2.JB.65
  (Pb_{20}Sn_{2}(Bi,As)_{22}S_{54}Cl_{6})
119. Vyacheslavite (IMA1983-017) 8.DN.20
  (IUPAC: diuranium(IV) dihydro diphosphate pentahydrate)
120. Vyalsovite (IMA1989-004) 2.FD.45
  (IUPAC: calcium iron aluminium pentahydro sulfide)
121. Vymazalováite (IMA2016-105) 2.0 [no] [no]
  (IUPAC: trilead disulfa dibismuthide)
122. Vysokýite (IMA2012-067) 4.0 [no] [no]
  (IUPAC: uranium(IV) tetra(dihydroxoarsenate(V)) tetrahydrate)
123. Vysotskite (IMA1967 s.p., 1962) 2.CC.35a
  (IUPAC: palladium sulfide)
124. Vyuntspakhkite-(Y) (IMA1982-040) 9.BG.40
