= Uramphite =

Uranyl phosphate mineral

Uramphit

General
- Category: Phosphate, Arsenate und Vanadate
- Formula: (NH_{4})(UO_{2})(PO_{4})·3H_{2}O
- IMA symbol: Uap
- Strunz classification: 8.EB.15
- Dana classification: 40.02a.07.01
- Crystal system: tetragonal
- Crystal class: ditetragonal-dipyramidal; 4/m2/m2/m
- Space group: P4/ncc (#130)

Identification
- Color: pale to bottle-green, pale yellow
- Cleavage: straight along two planes
- Mohs scale hardness: 2-3
- Luster: glass-shiny
- Streak: green-white to white
- Diaphaneity: translucent
- Density: 3.7 (measured), 3.26 (calculated) g/cm^{3}
- Refractive index: n_{α} = 1.564, n_{β} = 1.585
- Birefringence: 0.021
- Pleochroism: colorless vs. pale green
- Solubility: slightly in dilute, cold hydrochloric acid (HCl) or warm nitric acid (HNO_{3})
- Other characteristics: Radioactive

Uramphite is a rarely-found phosphate mineral in the "phosphate, arsenate and vanadate" mineral class with chemical composition (NH_{4})_{2}[UO_{2}PO_{4}]_{2}·6H_{2}O from which it is seen to be a hydrated ammonium uranyl phosphate.

Uramphite crystallizes in the tetragonal crystal system and develops rectangular crystal faces approximately 0.2 mm wide, but is also found as rosette-like mineral aggregates and surface films. The mineral is translucent a colored light to bottle-green or light yellow with a shiny lustre on the exterior.

== Etymology and history ==
Uramphite was discovered in 1950 in the uranium-coal-bed "Tura-Kaffak" near Minkush in the Moldo Too mountains in Naryn, Kyrgyzstan. Analysis and publication followed in 1957 through the efforts of Z. A. Nekrasova (Russian: З. А. Некрасова), who named the mineral after its composition of uranium, ammonium, and phosphate.

No type location for the mineral has yet been documented.

As uramphit was already known and acknowledged as a mineral prior to the International Mineralogical Association (IMA)'s establishment, the Commission on New Minerals, Nomenclature and Classification (CNMNC) accepted it and categorized it as a so-called "grandfathered" (G) mineral. The generally-accepted IMA/CNMNC abbreviation ("mineral symbol") for uramphite is "Uap".

== Classification ==
Already in the old Strunz 8th edition, uramphite belongs to the "phosphate, arsenate und vanadate" mineral class, group VII/D (hydrated phosphates, arsenates and vanadates with other anions)". It belonged to the uraninite (uranium mica, VII/D.20) subgroup, forming the "uranium family" (VII/D.20a) with autunite, bassetite, fritzscheite, heinrichite, kahlerite, kirchheimerite, sodium uranospinite, nováčekite, sabugalite, saléeite, torbernite, uranocircite, uranospathite, uranospinite and zeunerite.

In Stefan Weiß's most recent (2018) edition of the Lapis Mineral Catalogue, which maintains Karl Hugo Strunz's old system for the sake of private collectors and institutions, the mineral has identifier VII/E.02-160. In the "Lapis system" this corresponds to the newly defined category of "uranyl phosphates/arsenates and uranyl vanadates with [UO_{2}]^{2+}–[PO_{4}]/[AsO_{4}]^{3−} und [UO_{2}]^{2+}–[V_{2}O_{8}]^{6−} and isotypic vanadates (sincosite family)". Therein uramphite forms the "meta-autunite group" with number VII/E.02 together with abernathyite, bassetite, chernikovite, lehnerite, meta-ankoleite, meta-autunite, meta-heinrichite, meta-kahlerite, meta-kirchheimerite, meta-lodèvite, meta–sodium-autunite, meta-nováčekite, meta-rauchite, meta-saléeite, meta-torbernite, meta-uranocircite, meta-uranospinite, meta-zeunerite, sodium uranospinite, ulrichite, and uramarsite.

In the International Mineralogical Association (IMA)'s Strunz 9th edition (2009), uramphite is listed in the "uranyl phosphates and arsenates" category. This is further grouped by atomic proportions as a uranyl complex (UO_{2}) with phosphorus, arsenic, or vanadate complexes (RO_{4}), so that the mineral is accordingly found in the subgroup "UO_{2} : RO_{4} = 1 : 1". There it makes up the unnamed group 8.EB.15 together with abernathyite, chernikovite, meta-ankoleite, sodium uranospinite, trögerite, and uramarsite.

Also in the Dana mineral classification system, used predominantly in the English-speaking world, uramphite is classified in the "phosphate, arsenate and vanadates" and then in the group of "hydrated phosphates etc." There it forms the unnamed subgroup 40.02a.07 together with uramarsite, found in the group "hydrated phosphates etc., with A^{2+}(B^{2+})_{2}(XO_{4}) × x(H_{2}O) and (UO_{2})^{2+}".

== Crystal structure ==
Uramphite crystallizes in the tetragonal P4/ncc group (#130) with lattice parameters a = 7.02 Å and c = 18.08 Å with two formula units per unit cell.

== Characteristics ==
The mineral is quite strongly radioactive, on account of its uranium content (up to 54.46%). Given the elemental proportions in the atomic formula and also the subsequent products in the decays series, the mineral has a specific activity of approximately 97.481 kBq/g (for comparison: natural potassium has 0.0312 kBq/g). The quoted value may of course differ for any particular mineral, depending on content and retention of the decay products, as these vary the activity.

Uramphite is slightly soluble in dilute cold hydrochloric acid (HCl) and warm nitric acid (HNO_{3}). Under UV light, uramphite shows a yellowish-green fluorescence, diminishing in intensity as the mineral is heated. If heated for a long time at 500 °C, the fluorescence vanishes entirely.

== Formation and discovery location ==
Uramphite forms in the oxidation zone of the uranium-coal bed "Tura-Kaffak" and can be found in the broken coal at a 20–50 m depth below the surface. The uramphit mineral community is generally unnamed, but in the aforementioned type locality, the (As of 2023) only known deposit, gypsum and meta-autunite have been found.

== Safety ==
Because of the mineral's strongly ionizing radiation, possible uramphite minerals should only be examined in dust- and radiation-protecting gear, and above all never stored in living-, bedding-, or workspaces. In general, absorption into the body (bodily incorporation, ingestion) should always be prevented and for safety direct bodily contact avoided. Handling of the mineral ought be performed wearing a mouth-guard and gloves.

== See also ==
- List of minerals
