= Vatsimanyoki =

Vatsimanyoki Vaatsimenjoki
- Native name: Ватсиманйоки (Russian)

Location
- Country: Russia
- Region: Murmansk Oblast

Physical characteristics
- Mouth: Tuntsayoki
  - coordinates: 67.2225°N 29.9681°E
- Length: 50 km (31 mi)
- Basin size: 547 km^{2} (211 sq mi)

Basin features
- Progression: Tuntsayoki→ Tumcha→ Iova Reservoir→ Kovda→ White Sea

The Vatsimanyoki (Russian: Ватсиманйоки, Finnish: Vaatsimenjoki) is a river in the south of the Murmansk Oblast, Russia. It is 50 kilometres (31 mi) long, and has a drainage basin of 547 square kilometres (211 sq mi). The Vatsimanyoki flows into the Tuntsayoki.
