= Lake Yurkhyamyayarvi =

Lake in Murmansk Oblast, Russia

- Jyrhämäjärvi (Finnish); Юрхямяярви (Russian)
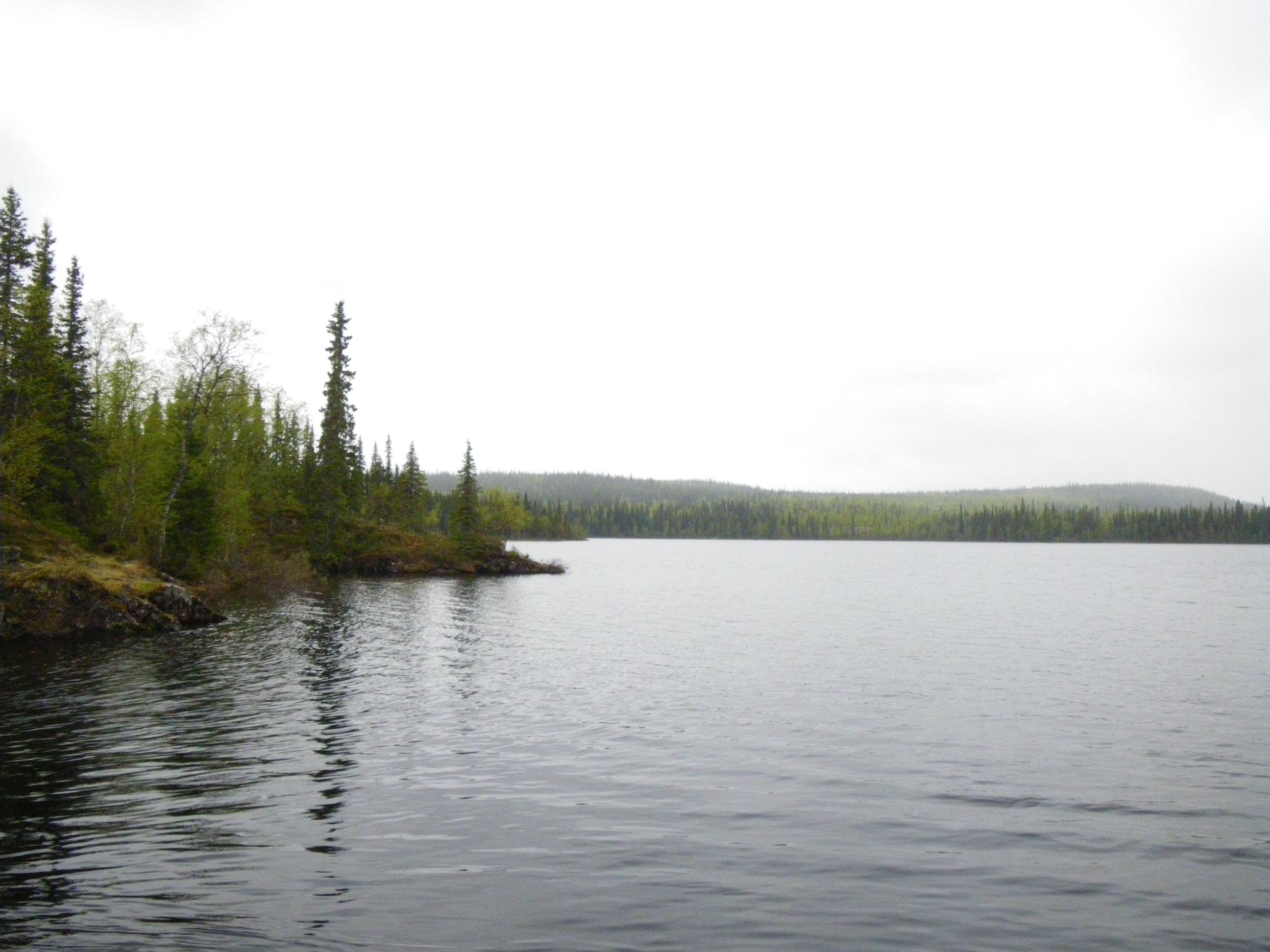

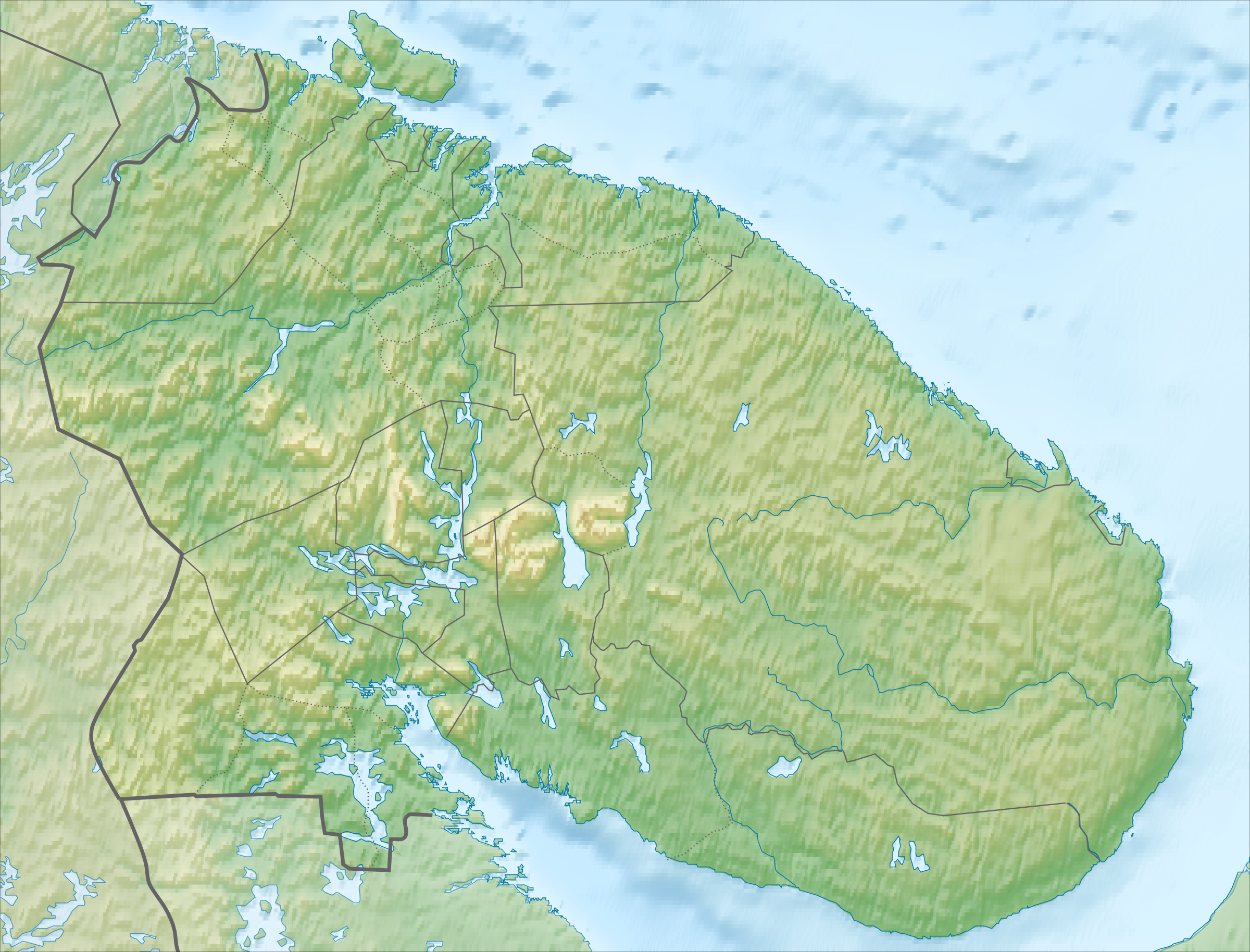
- Location within Murmansk Oblast Location within Russia
- Location: Murmansk Oblast, Russia
- Coordinates: 66°42′22″N 29°51′32″E
- Primary inflows: Vuosnayoki
- Primary outflows: Vuosnayoki
- Basin countries: Russia
- Max. length: 1 km (0.62 mi)
- Max. width: 1.75 km (1.09 mi)
- Surface elevation: 249 m (817 ft)

Lake Yurkhyamyayarvi (Russian: Юрхямяярви; Finnish: Jyrhämäjärvi) is a freshwater lake in Murmansk Oblast, Russia. It has an elevation of 249 meters (817 ft). The river Vuosnayoki flows from the lake.

Lake Yurkhyamyayarvi is located in a sparsely populated area of the Kola Peninsula, near the Finland–Russia border. The lake is approximately 1.75 km long and 1 km wide, with a shoreline measuring about 7.9 km. Several small streams and Lake Niluttiyarvi feed into it, while the Vuosnayoki flows through the lake.
