= Tumchaite =

Phyllosilicate mineral

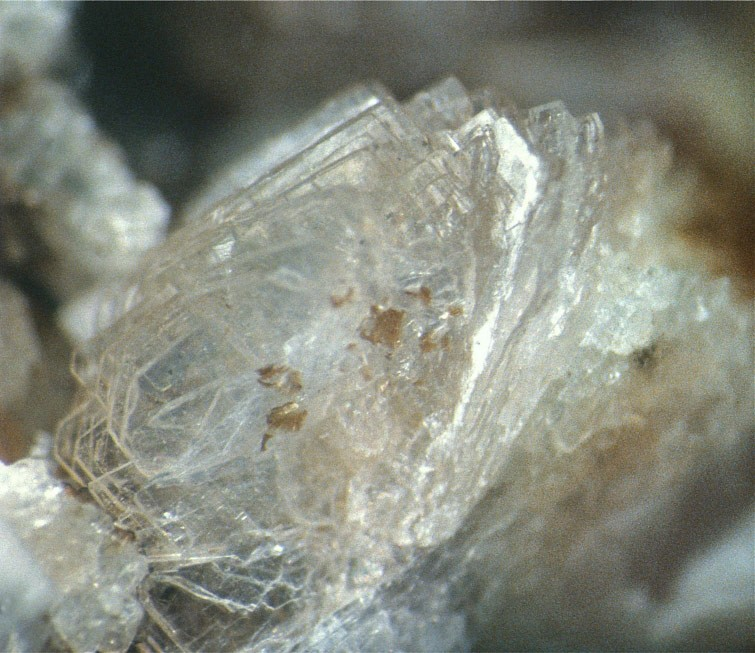

General
- Category: Phyllosilicate minerals
- Formula: Na_{2}(Zr,Sn)Si_{4}O_{11}·H_{2}O
- IMA symbol: Tum
- Crystal system: Monoclinic
- Crystal class: Prismatic (2/m) (same H-M symbol)
- Space group: P2_{1}/c
- Unit cell: a = 9.144 Å, b = 8.818 Å c = 7.537 Å, β = 113.22°; Z = 2

Identification
- Formula mass: 462.51 g/mol
- Color: Colorless to white
- Crystal habit: Prismatic, tabular, massive, granular
- Twinning: on {100}
- Cleavage: Perfect on {100}
- Fracture: Uneven
- Tenacity: Brittle
- Mohs scale hardness: Close to 4.5
- Luster: Vitreous
- Streak: Colorless to white
- Diaphaneity: Translucent to transparent
- Specific gravity: 2.78
- Optical properties: Biaxial (-)
- Refractive index: n_{α} = 1.570, n_{β} = 1.588, n_{γ} = 1.594
- Birefringence: δ = 0.0240
- Pleochroism: Colorless to greenish-gray
- 2V angle: 60 (5)°
- Ultraviolet fluorescence: None
- Solubility: Does not dissolve with dilute HCl

Tumchaite, Na_{2}(Zr,Sn)Si_{4}O_{11}·H_{2}O, is a colorless to white monoclinic phyllosilicate mineral. It is associated with calcite, dolomite, and pyrite in the late dolomite-calcite carbonatites. It can be transparent to translucent; has a vitreous luster; and has perfect cleavage on {100}. Its hardness is 4.5, between fluorite and apatite. Tumchaite is isotypic with penkvilksite. The structure of the mineral is identified by silicate sheets parallel {100}, formed by alternation of clockwise and counterclockwise growing spiral chains of corner-sharing SiO_{4} tetrahedra. Tumchaite is named for the river Tumcha near Vuoriyarvi massif.

== Occurrence ==
Tumchaite is found in carbonatites of the alkaline-ultramafic Vuoriyarvi massif, the Murmansk Region, Russia. This is located in the North Karelia on the north shore of the Vuoriyarvi lake and occupies an area of about 19.5 km^{2}. The mineral has been found as lens-like segregation of .5 x 1.0 x 1.5 cm^{3} in size in core sample from the bore hole. Tumchaite is associated with calcite, dolomite, a mineral of the serpentine group, and pyrite, and is formed during the hydrothermal alteration of carbonatites.

== Physical properties ==
Tumchaite occurs as tabular monoclinic crystals, but other habits include massive and granular. The size of individual crystals is approximately 0.2 x 1.2 x 2.5 mm^{3}. It is colorless to white, transparent to translucent. The streak is white and the luster is vitreous. Cleavage on {100} is perfect, no parting is observed, and fracture is uneven as tumchaite is very brittle. The Mohs hardness is 4.5, between fluorite and apatite. The Vickers hardness test yielded 365 to 445- averaging 410- kg/mm^{2} with a 40 g load. The density, which was determined by flotation of the mineral using a dilute Clerici-H_{2}O solution, was 2.78 (2) g/cm^{3} versus the 2.77 g/cm^{3} determined by the empirical formula.

== Chemical composition ==
Subbotin et al., performed quantitative electron microprobe analysis with MS 46 CAMECA instrument operated at 20kV (30 for Zr) and sample current 15-30 nA. The following standards were used for the elements shown in parentheses: lorenzenite (for Na and Ti), diopside (Ca and Si), wadeite (Zr), hematite (Fe), MnCO_{3} (Mn), Y_{3}Al_{5}O_{12} (Y), metallic Sn, Hf, and Nb.

Water contents could not be determined due to little amount of homogeneous material. The presence of molecular water in the mineral was confirmed by the refinement of the crystal structure. The empirical formula, calculated on the basis of 13 O atoms is (Na_{2.03}Ca_{0.01})(Zr_{0.76}Sn_{0.17}Ti_{0.02}Hf_{0.01})Si_{4.02}O_{11}·2H_{2}O, simplified to Na_{2}(Zr,Sn)Si_{4}O_{11}·H_{2}O.

== X-ray crystallography ==
A single crystal with the approximate dimensions of 0.20 x 0.20 x 0.20 mm^{3} was selected for the X-ray study. This study was performed using a Siemens P4 four circle diffractometer, using graphite monochromatized MoKα radiation (λ=0.71073 Å). Unit cell parameters were found through a least square fit using 25 medium θ reflections: a=9.144 (4), b=8.818 (3), c=7.537 (3) Å, β=113.22 (3)°, V=558.49 Å^{3}, Z=2. The full diffraction pattern can be found in Table 2 of Subbotin, et al.

== Structure ==
Tumchaite is isotypic with penkvilksite-1M and is chemically related to vlasovite. The dominant structural feature of tumchaite is the silicate sheet [Si_{4}O_{11}] parallel to {100}, which can be considered as a result of condensation of the tetrahedral spiral chains running along [010] with six tetrahedra in the repeat unit. Adjacent spirals are oriented in alternate clockwise and counterclockwise ways. Tumchaite contains two symmetrically independent SiO_{4} tetrahedra: Si1 and Si2 have two and three bridging O atoms, respectively.

The tetrahedral silicate sheets are connected by cationic octahedra with a disordered distribution of Zr and Sn (at 0, 1/2, 0), with the Zr/Sn ratio in these octahedra being 4. Figure 2 of Subbotin, et al., shows an illustration of this structure.
