= Niels Viggo Ussing =

Niels Viggo Ussing (14 June 1864 – 23 July 1911), was a professor of Mineralogy, University of Copenhagen, Denmark. The mineral ussingite is named after this Professor. This mineral named after him, was first described by the mineralogist Ove Balthasar Bøggild.
