= Vuosnayoki =

Vuosnayoki Vuosnajoki
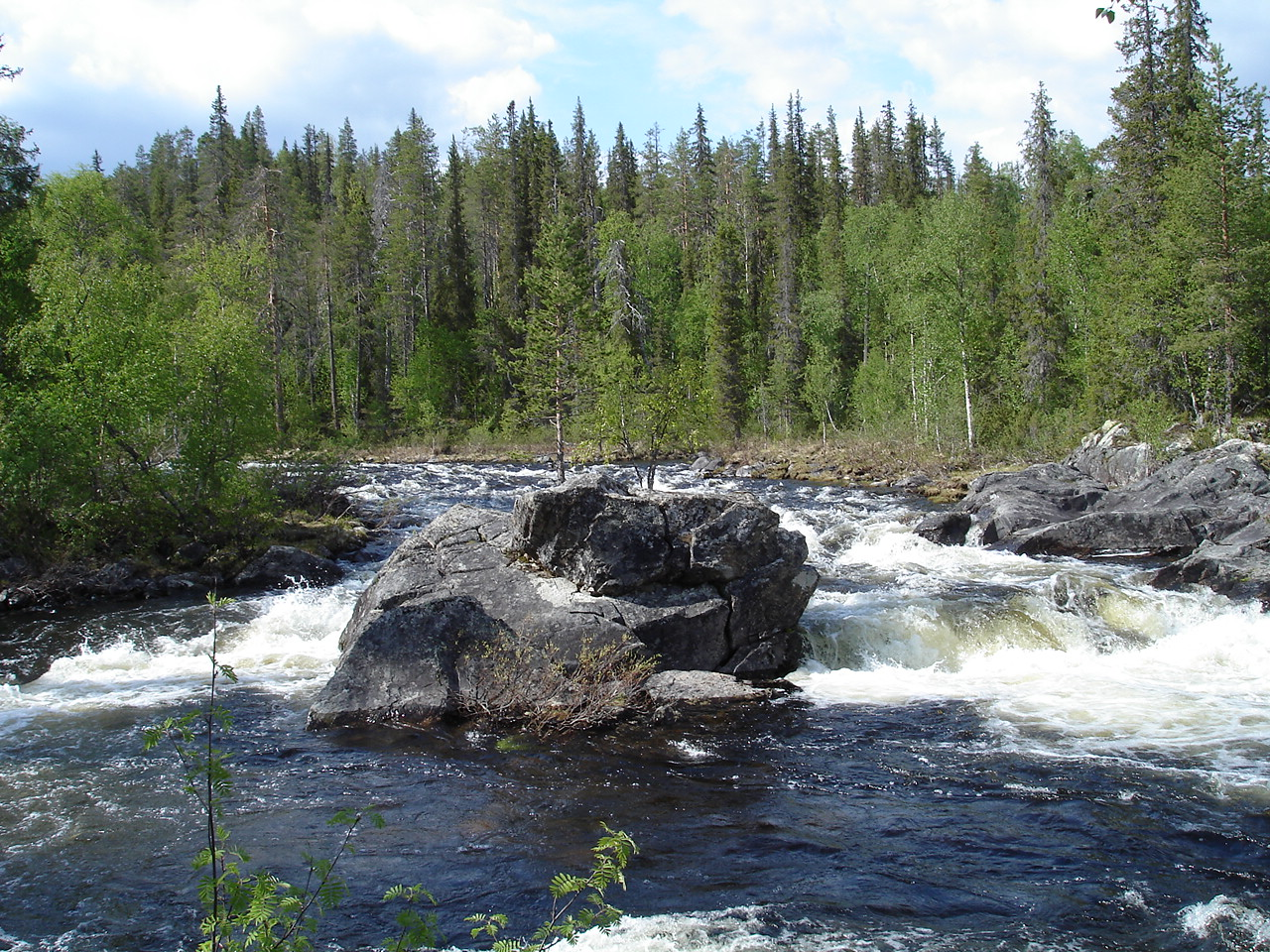
- Native name: Вуоснайоки (Russian)

Location
- Country: Russia
- Region: Murmansk Oblast

Physical characteristics
- Mouth: Lake Nivayarvi
  - coordinates: 66°42′37″N 29°58′04″E
- Length: 66 km (41 mi)
- Basin size: 661 km^{2} (255 sq mi)
- Discharge
  - location: mouth
  - average: 8 m^{3}/s (280 cu ft/s)

Basin features
- Progression: Lake Nivayarvi→ Kutsayoki→ Tumcha→ Iova Reservoir→ Kovda→ White Sea

The Vuosnayoki (Russian: Вуоснайоки, Finnish: Vuosnajoki) is a river in the south of the Kola Peninsula in Murmansk Oblast, Russia. It is 66 kilometres (41 mi) long, and has a drainage basin of 661 square kilometres (255 sq mi). The river flows into the Lake Nivayarvi, which is drained by the Kutsayoki.
