= Kutsayoki =

Kutsajoki Kutsajoki
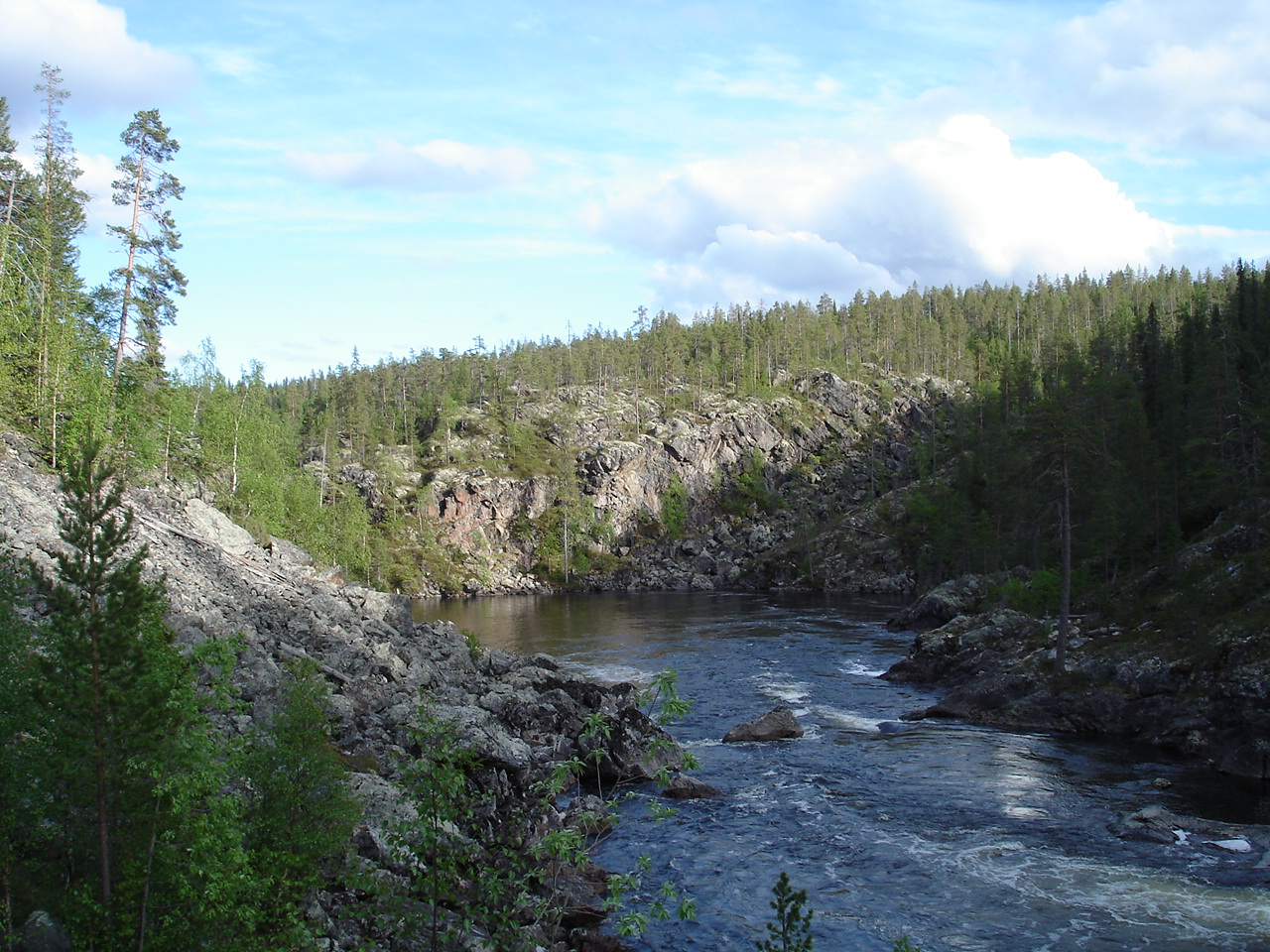
- Native name: Кутсайоки (Russian)

Location
- Country: Russia
- Region: Murmansk Oblast

Physical characteristics
- Source
  - location: Lake Nivayarvi
  - elevation: 198 m (650 ft)
- Mouth
  - location: Tumcha
  - coordinates: 66°44′30″N 30°29′25″E
- Length: 80 km (50 mi)
- Basin size: 1,350 km^{2} (520 sq mi)

Basin features
- Progression: Tumcha→ Iova Reservoir→ Kovda→ White Sea
- Tributaries
  - right: Vuosnayoki

The Kutsayoki (Russian: Кутсайоки, Finnish: Kutsajoki) is a river in the south of the Kola Peninsula in Murmansk Oblast, Russia. It is 80 kilometres (50 mi) long, and has a drainage basin of 1,350 square kilometres (520 sq mi). The Kutsayoki flows through the Lake Nivayarvi and flows into the Tumcha. Its biggest tributary is the Vuosnayoki.
