= Tuntsayoki =

Tuntsayoki Finnish: Tuntsajoki
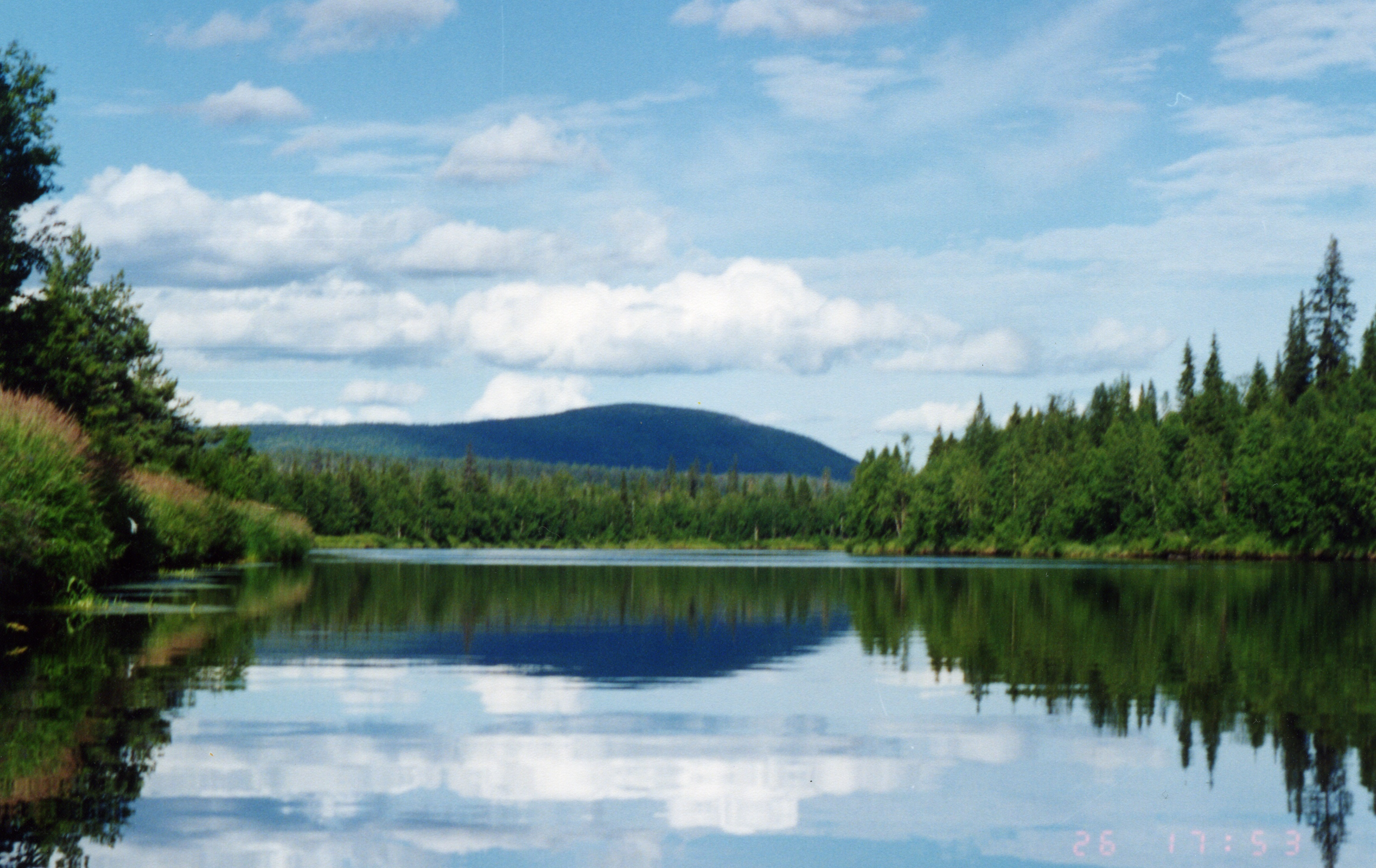
- Native name: Тунтсайоки (Russian)

Location
- Countries: Russia; Finland
- Oblast: Murmansk
- Region: Lapland

Physical characteristics
- Mouth
  - location: Tumcha
  - coordinates: 66.7368°N 30.4896°E
- Length: 150 km (93 mi)

Basin features
- Progression: Tumcha→ Iova Reservoir→ Kovda→ White Sea
- Tributaries
  - left: Vatsimanyoki

The Tuntsayoki (Russian: Тунтсайоки, Finnish: Tuntsajoki) is a river in the south of the Kola Peninsula in Murmansk Oblast, Russia. It is 150 kilometres (93 mi) long. The Tuntsayoki originates in the forests of Finland and flows into the river Tumcha. Its biggest tributary is the Vatsimanyoki.
