= Ussingite =

Phyllosilicate mineral

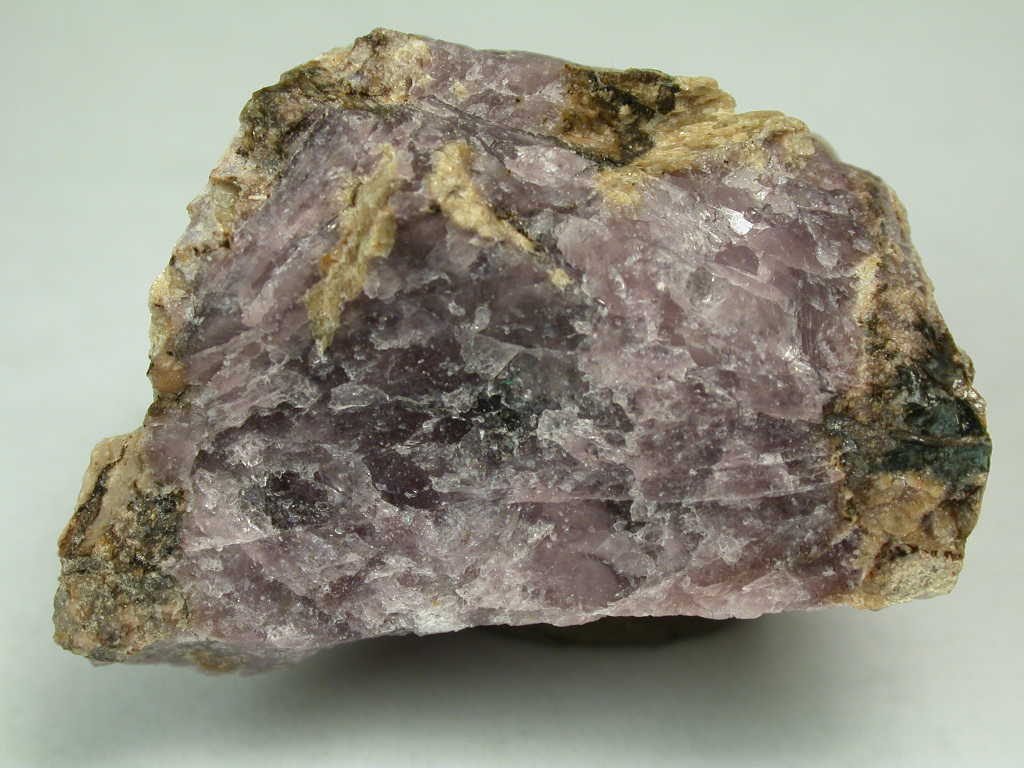
- Ussingite from Shkatulka pegmatite, Umbozero mine (Umbozerskii mine), Alluaiv Mt, Lovozero Massif, Kola Peninsula, Murmanskaja Oblast', Northern Region, Russia

General
- Category: Phyllosilicate minerals
- Formula: Na_{2}AlSi_{3}O_{8}OH
- IMA symbol: Usg
- Strunz classification: 9.EH.20
- Crystal system: Triclinic
- Crystal class: Pinacoidal (1̅) (same H-M symbol)
- Space group: P1̅

Identification
- Color: pale to medium violet, reddish violet; sometimes barely tinted purple
- Fracture: irregular/ uneven
- Tenacity: brittle
- Mohs scale hardness: 6–7
- Luster: sub-vitreous
- Streak: white
- Diaphaneity: transparent, translucent

Ussingite is a silicate mineral with formula Na_{2}AlSi_{3}O_{8}(OH).

It was named for Niels Viggo Ussing (1864–1911), Copenhagen, Denmark.
