= Vanarsite =

General
- Category: Vanadate mineral, Arsenate mineral, Arsenite mineral
- Formula: NaCa_{12}(As^{3+}V^{4+}_{3.5}V^{5+}_{8.5}As^{5+}_{6}O_{51})_{2}・78H_{2}O
- IMA symbol: Vns
- Crystal system: Monoclinic
- Space group: 2/m
- Unit cell: a = 25.8815(5) Å; b = 10.9416(2) Å; c = 28.2861(6) Å; Z = 2, V = 7828.9(3) Å^{3}

Identification
- Color: Very dark blue
- Crystal habit: Prismatic
- Twinning: Not observed
- Cleavage: {100} fair
- Fracture: Curved
- Tenacity: Brittle
- Mohs scale hardness: 2
- Luster: Vitreous
- Streak: Grayish blue
- Diaphaneity: Transparent
- Density: 2.460 g/cm^{3} (calculated); 2.48(2) g/cm^{3} (measured)
- Optical properties: Biaxial negative
- Pleochroism: X = cornflower blue, Y = dark blue, Z = dark blue; X << Z ≈ Y
- 2V angle: 37(2)° (measured)
- Dispersion: Not observable
- Ultraviolet fluorescence: None
- Vanadates, Arsenates, and Arsenites

Vanarsite, NaCa_{12}(As^{3+}V^{4+}_{3.5}V^{5+}_{8.5}As^{5+}_{6}O_{51})_{2}・78H_{2}O, is a mineral that forms as very dark blue blades that are flattened on {100} and elongated on [010]. The crystals form in sub-parallel intergrowths in aggregates up to 5 mm long and are part of the cubic crystal system. The mineral is found in the Packrat mine in Colorado, USA in association with three mineral of similar composition, packratite, Ca_{11}(As^{3+}V^{4+}_{2}V^{5+}_{10}As^{5+}_{6}O_{51})_{2}・83H_{2}O, morrisonite, Ca_{6}(As^{3+}V^{4+}_{2}V^{5+}_{10}As^{5+}_{6}O_{51})_{2}・78H_{2}O, and gatewayite, Ca_{11}(As^{3+}V^{4+}_{3}V^{5+}_{9}As^{5+}_{6}O_{51})・31H_{2}O. Vanarsite has been determined to be part of the vanadate, arsenite, and arsenate groups. Analytical methods were used to determine its chemical composition, physical properties, and structure.

== Physical and Optical Properties ==
Vanarsite's physical properties show a very dark blue color, grayish blue streak, vitreous luster, and a hardness of 2 on the Mohs hardness scale. It also has transparent diaphaneity, brittle tenacity, curved fracture, and fair cleavage on {100}. Vanarsite has a calculated density of 2.460 g/cm^{3} and a measured density of 2.48(2) g/cm^{3}. Its optical class is biaxial (-) with an α value of 1.645(5), a β value of 1.677(calc), and a γ value of 1.681(calc). It has a 2V value of 37(2)° (measured), and its dispersion is not observed. It has orientation where X = b, Y ^ a = 12° in obtuse β and pleochroism where X = cornflower blue, Y = dark blue, Z = dark blue; X << Z ≈ Y.

== Occurrence ==
Vanarsite is a relatively rare mineral with only a small quantity of the mineral having been found. It was discovered in the main tunnel of the Packrat mine, Gateway district, Mesa County, Colorado, USA. Packrat mine is located in the northern part of the Uravan Mineral Belt where uranium and vanadium containing minerals often occur together in sandstone from the Salt Wash member of the Jurassic Morrison Formation. Vanarsite was found located with three other minerals that were discovered at the same time in the same locality, packratite, morrisonite, and gatewayite and is also associated with pharmacolite. The mineral forms from the oxidation of montroseite and corvusite minerals in moist environments. Oxidized and unoxidized phases are exposed from mining operations. Ambient temperatures and oxidizing conditions near the surface cause water to react with pyrite and an unknown arsenic bearing phase to form aqueous solutions with low pH. Various secondary vanadate phases form depending on Eh-pH conditions and other cations present.

== Chemical Analysis ==
Chemical analysis was performed using a Cameca SX-50 electron microprobe at the University of Utah with four wavelength dispersive spectrometers. Analytical conditions include 15keV accelerating voltage, 10 nA beam current, and a beam diameter of 10-15μm. In the analysis, vanadium, arsenic, strontium, sodium, and calcium were counted simultaneously with counts occurring 10 seconds for each except Na which was 5 seconds on their respective spectrometers. Standards for the elements were: YVO_{4} (V), GaAs (As), Sr-titanate (Sr), albite (Na), and diopside (Ca). The constituents analyzed were normalized for a total of 100% weight combined with the calculated H_{2}O. The weight percents for each cation in terms of oxygen are as follows: 0.63 for Na_{2}O, 13.08 for CaO, 0.22 for SrO, 0.04 for FeO, 31.61 for As_{2}O_{5}, and 43.89 for V_{2}O_{5}.

== Crystallography and Structure ==
Powder and single crystal X-ray analysis were used in the determination of the crystallography and structure of the mineral. A Gandolfi-like motion was used in the powder diffraction method in the φ and ω axes to randomize the samples. The derived d-values and intensities were analyzed using JADE 2010 software. The structure of the mineral was determined with Rigaku CrystalClear software using an empirical multi-scan absorption. The structural unit was determined to be a heteropolyanion consisting of twelve distorted octahedra (V^{4+,5+}O_{6}) around a central pyramid (As^{3+}O_{3} (arsenite)) and decorated by peripheral tetrahedra (As^{5+}O_{4} (arsenate)). Each peripheral tetrahedra shares three of its four vertices with octahedra (VO_{6}). The very dark blue color results from a V^{4+}-V^{5+} charge transfer in the V sites.

== See also ==
- List of minerals
