= Abernathyite =

Type of mineral

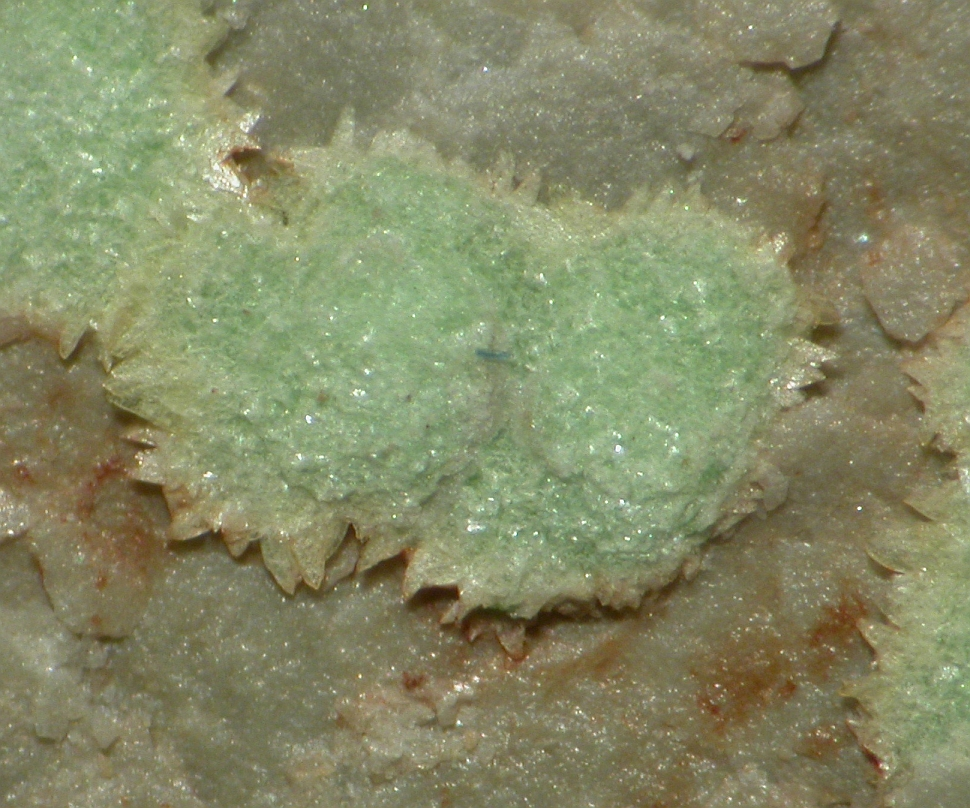
- Pale yellow abernathyite crystals and green heinrichite crystals

General
- Category: Arsenate minerals
- Formula: K(UO_{2})(AsO_{4})·3H_{2}O
- IMA symbol: Abn
- Strunz classification: 8.EB.15
- Dana classification: 40.2a.9.1
- Crystal system: Tetragonal
- Crystal class: Ditetragonal dipyramidal (4/mmm); H-M symbol: (4/m 2/m 2/m)
- Space group: P4/ncc
- Unit cell: a = 7.176, c = 18.126 [Å] Z = 4

Identification
- Color: Yellow
- Cleavage: Perfect on {001}
- Tenacity: Brittle
- Mohs scale hardness: 2.5–3
- Luster: Sub-Vitreous, resinous, waxy, greasy
- Streak: Pale yellow
- Diaphaneity: Transparent
- Specific gravity: 3.32 (measured) 3.572 (calculated)
- Optical properties: Uniaxial (−)
- Refractive index: n_{ω} = 1.597 – 1.608 n_{ε} = 1.570
- Birefringence: δ = 0.027 – 0.038
- Pleochroism: Weak
- 2V angle: 5° (measured)
- Ultraviolet fluorescence: Yellow-green in longwave and shortwave UV
- Other characteristics: Radioactive

Abernathyite is a mineral with formula K(UO_{2})(AsO_{4})·3H_{2}O. The mineral is named after Jesse Evrett Abernathy (1913–1963) who first noted it in 1953 in the U.S. State of Utah. It was described as a new mineral species in 1956. Abernathyite is yellow and occurs as small crystals.

== Description ==
Abernathyite is a transparent, yellow mineral that occurs as tabular crystals up to 3 millimeters (0.12 in). The mineral has a single perfect cleavage on {001}. Abernathyite fluoresces yellow-green in longwave and shortwave ultraviolet. Because of its uranium content, the mineral is radioactive.

== Occurrence and formation ==
Abernathyite forms as a coating on fractures of asphaltic sandstone containing uranium deposits. The mineral occurs in association with heinrichite, scorodite, and zeunerite. Abernathyite is known from France, Germany, Poland, South Africa, and the United States.

== Structure and formula ==
When first described in 1956, the formula was identified as K(UO_{2})(AsO_{4})·4H_{2}O. However, only about 25 milligrams of the mineral was available for analysis, so a number of precautions were taken by running duplicate analyses and using artificial mixtures. In 1964, further study of the mineral identified inconsistencies between electron-density subtraction maps and the chemical evidence that abernathyite contains potassium. This led the authors to revise the formula as K(UO_{2})(AsO_{4})·3H_{2}O.

Abernathyite crystallizes in the tetragonal crystal system.

== History ==
Jess Abernathy was the operator of the Fuemrol mine in Emery County, Utah. In the summer of 1953, he noted yellow crystals coating sandstone at the mine which he thought might be mineralogically significant. The specimens were sent to Grand Junction, Colorado, for study by United States Atomic Energy Commission (AEC) mineralogist E. B. Gross. He could not match the mineral's optical properties with any known species, so he sent the specimens to Washington D.C. where adequate facilities were available for further investigation. Mineralogists A. D. Weeks and M. E. Thompson of the United States Geological Survey studied the mineral on behalf of the AEC's Raw Materials Division.

Abernathyite was described in the journal American Mineralogist in 1956. The mineral was named abernathyite in honor of discoverer Jess Abernathy. Type specimens are held in the National Museum of Natural History in Washington, D.C.

== See also ==
- List of minerals
