= Vuagnatite =

Silicate mineral

General
- Category: Minerals
- Formula: CaAl(SiO_{4})(OH)
- IMA symbol: Vgn
- Strunz classification: 9.AG.60
- Dana classification: 52.4.2.2
- Crystal system: Orthorhombic
- Crystal class: Disphenoidal [[H-M Symbol]]: 222
- Space group: P2_{1}2_{1}2_{1}
- Unit cell: 341.98

Identification
- Color: Colourless, light blue, light pink, tan
- Cleavage: Perfect
- Tenacity: Brittle
- Mohs scale hardness: 6
- Luster: Vitreous
- Streak: White
- Diaphaneity: Transparent, translucent
- Optical properties: Biaxial (-)
- Refractive index: n_{α} = 1.700 n_{β} = 1.725 n_{γ} = 1.730
- Birefringence: 0.030
- 2V angle: Measured: 48° Calculated: 46°
- Dispersion: Relatively weak
- Common impurities: H_{2}O

Vuagnatite is a member of the adelite-descloizite group which was named after Prof. Dr. Marc Bernard Vuagnat. Its type locality is in Turkey, at Bögürtlencik Tepe. It was approved in 1975 by the IMA.

== Properties ==
Vuagnatite is a mineral mainly consisting of oxygen (45.41%), calcium (22.75%), silicon (15.94%) and aluminum (15.32%), with traces of hydrogen (0.57%). It does not show radioactive properties. It widely occurs in prehnite and in hydrogrossular assemblages. It was first reported from an ophiolite suite in rodingite dikes. It has been described from rodingitised gabbro, rodingites and greywacke cobbles, and as veins in serpentinite. Some of the recorded occurrences were in Japan, New Zealand, Turkey, Guatemala and California. It grows in small, inclusion-free, chemically pure isometric crystals up to a millimeter. The brown coloration is most probably caused by the high quantity of iron oxide within the mineral, as darker specimens are rich in both titanium dioxide and iron oxide. Some of the crystals have small zones which seems to be continuous with the rest of the crystal, that shows deeper coloring. Some of the samples of these properties have either a brown or blueish coloring, but other colors are not out of the question. It shows pleochroic attributes, meaning depending on which axis the mineral is seen on, it appears as if it is changing colors. On the α axis it is seen in a pale brown, almost pinkish color, but on the β and γ ones, it appears to be colourless.
