= Heinrichite =

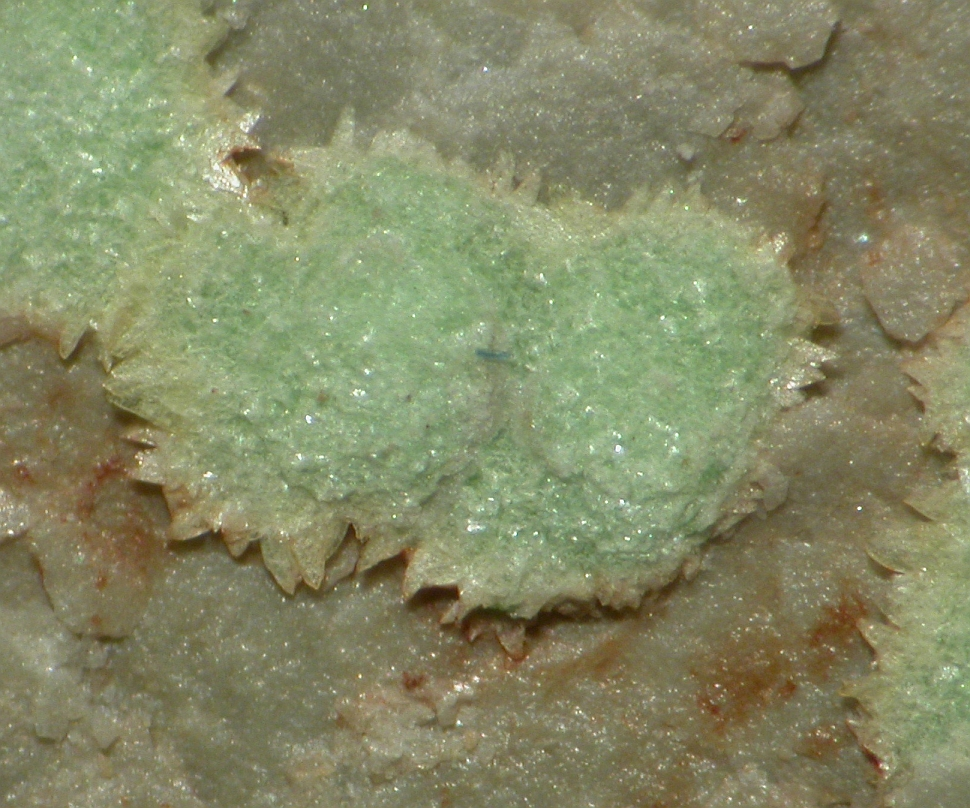
- Green heinrichite crystals and pale yellow abernathyite crystals

General
- Category: Phosphate mineral
- Formula: Ba(UO_{2})_{2}(AsO_{4})_{2}·10H_{2}0
- IMA symbol: Hrc
- Strunz classification: 8.EB.05
- Dana classification: 40.2a.9.1
- Crystal system: Monoclinic
- Crystal class: Strunz
- Unit cell: a = 7.155 Å, b = 7.134 Å, c = 21.29 Å β = 104.171

Identification
- Color: Pale yellow, pale green
- Streak: Pale yellow
- Optical properties: uniaxial (−)
- Refractive index: nω = 1.605 nε = 1.573
- Birefringence: 0.032
- Ultraviolet fluorescence: Yellow-green in longwave and shortwave UV
- Other characteristics: Radioactive

Heinrichite is a monoclinic-prismatic containing arsenic, barium, hydrogen, oxygen, and uranium. The mineral is named after Eberhardt William Heinrich (1918–1991) who first noted it in 1958 in the U.S. State of Oregon.

== Description ==
Heinrichite is radioactive pale green, pale yellow mineral. Heinrichite fluoresces light-green in longwave and shortwave ultraviolet. Because of its uranium content, the mineral is radioactive.
