= Uakitite =

Mineral found in a single meteorite

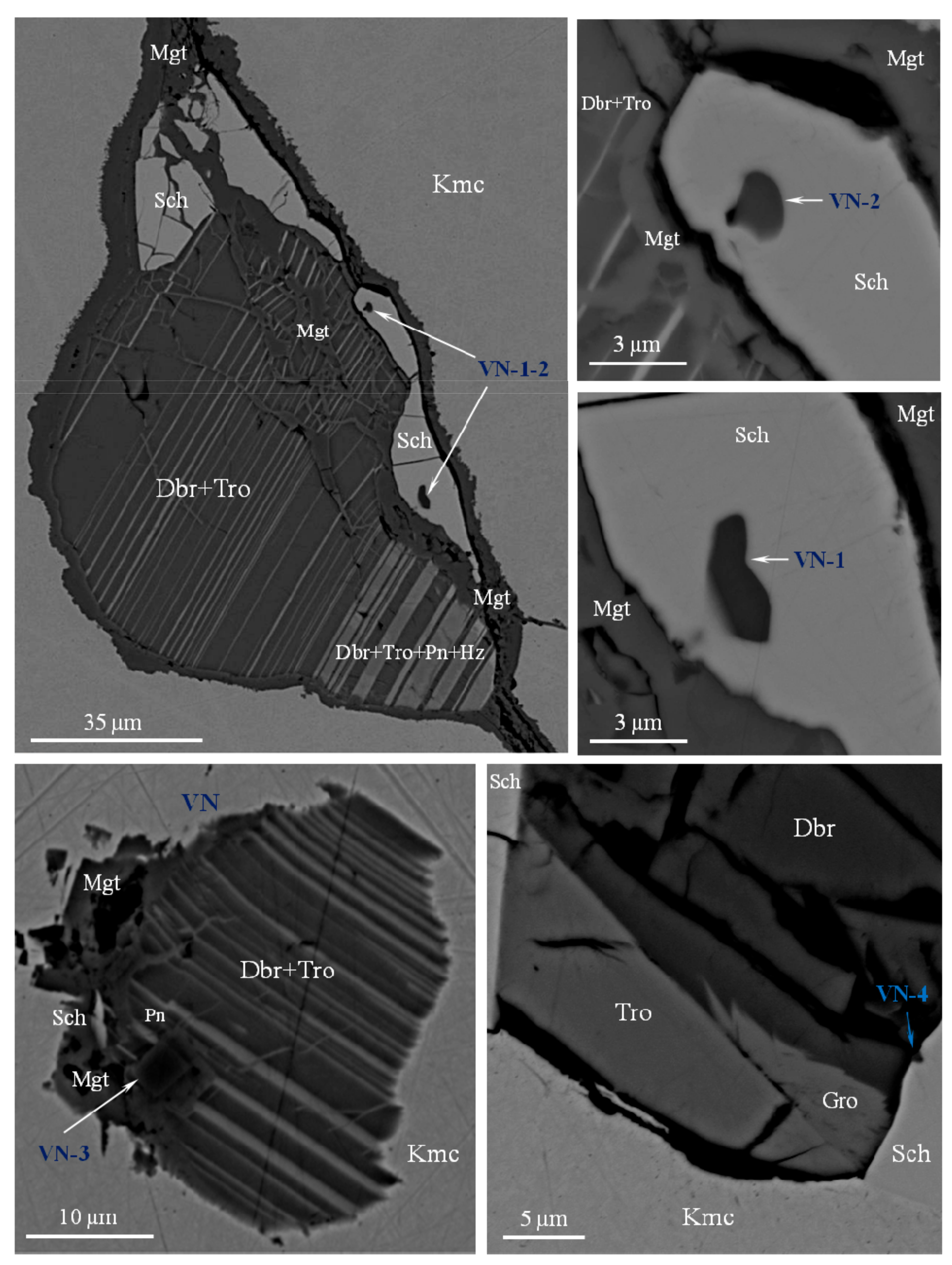
Uakitite (VN) within the meteorite

Uakitite is a mineral found in a single meteorite on Earth, called the Uakit meteorite, that fell in the Bauntovsky Evenkiysky District, in Republic of Buryatia, Russia. It was named after the region in which it was found, Uakit.

Uakitite is composed of vanadium nitride, a chemical compound of vanadium and nitrogen with formula VN.

While the majority of the meteorite is composed of an iron and nickel alloy called kamacite, a small percentage of the meteorite contains minerals that are only found in space, including uakitite. Like other mononitrides, uakitite is estimated to be very hard, however, studying all the properties has proven difficult as the only samples are 5 micrometers in size, many times smaller than a grain of sand.

The mineral was named at the Annual Meeting of the Meteoritical Society. As of November 2019, the name has been recognized by the International Mineralogical Association, and is considered official.
