= Vlasovite =

Silicate mineral

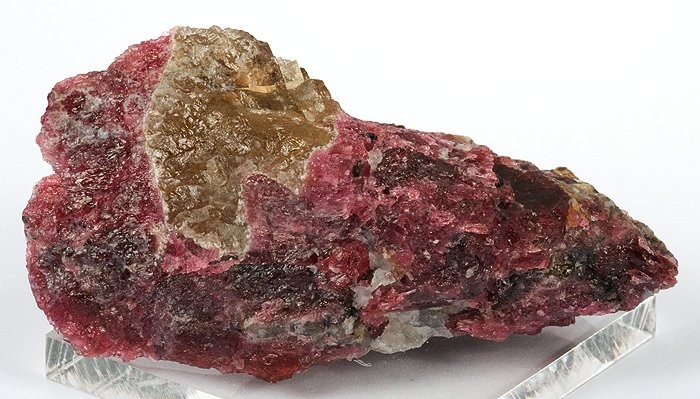
- Golden-amber vlasovite crystal frozen in cherry-red eudialyte matrix

General
- Category: Silicate mineral
- Formula: Na_{2}ZrSi_{4}O_{11}
- IMA symbol: Vsv
- Strunz classification: 9.DM.25 (10 ed); 8/F.34-20 (8 ed)
- Dana classification: 66.2.2.1
- Crystal system: Monoclinic
- Crystal class: Prismatic (2/m) (same H-M symbol)
- Space group: B2/b

Identification
- Formula mass: 425.54 g/mol
- Color: Usually colorless or brownish
- Crystal habit: Crystals rare; usually grains and aggregates
- Twinning: Uncommon, with twin plane {010}
- Cleavage: Distinct on {010}
- Fracture: Irregular to conchoidal
- Tenacity: Brittle
- Mohs scale hardness: 6
- Luster: Greasy; vitreous to pearly on cleavage
- Streak: White
- Diaphaneity: Transparent to translucent
- Specific gravity: 2.97
- Optical properties: Biaxial (−)
- Refractive index: N_{x} = 1.607, N_{y} = 1.623, N_{z} = 1.628
- Pleochroism: (x): colorless. (y): colorless. (z): colorless.
- Solubility: Nearly insoluble in HCl and HNO_{3}, but dissolves easily in a mixture of HF and H_{2}SO_{4}
- Other characteristics: Non-fluorescent, but altered material fluoresces yellow-orange

Vlasovite is a rare inosilicate (chain silicate) mineral with sodium and zirconium, with the chemical formula Na_{2}ZrSi_{4}O_{11}. It was discovered in 1961 at Vavnbed Mountain in the Lovozero Massif, in the Northern Region of Russia. The researchers who first identified it, R P Tikhonenkova and M E Kazakova, named it for Kuzma Aleksevich Vlasov (1905–1964), a Russian mineralogist and geochemist who studied the Lovozero massif, and who was the founder of the Institute of Mineralogy, Geochemistry, and Crystal Chemistry of Rare Elements, Moscow, Russia.

== Structure ==
At temperatures below 29 °C the stable form of vlasovite is triclinic 1̅, space group P1̅. Above 29 °C the stable form is monoclinic 2/m. Most sources simply give it as monoclinic 2/m, space group C2/c. The silicate part of the structure is a chain composed of rings of four SiO_{4} tetrahedra linked by sharing a corner oxygen to form a chain of composition [Si_{4}O_{11}]^{6−}. These chains of tetrahedra link together with zirconium, Zr, octahedra to form a framework with channels extending along [001], parallel to the c crystal axis. The channels contain the sodium, Na, atoms.

== Unit cell ==
The unit cell parameters are a = 11 Å, b = 10 Å, c = 8.5 Å and β = 100°, with 4 formula units per unit cell (Z = 4).
More accurate values are given by various sources as follows.

For the monoclinic cell:

- a = 10.98 Å, b = 10.00 Å, c = 8.52 Å, β = 100.40°
- a = 11.0390(5) Å, b = 10.0980(4) Å, c = 8.5677(4) Å, β = 100.313(1)°
- a = 11.063 Å, b = 10.15 Å, c = 8.60 Å, β = 100.3°

For the triclinic cell:

- a = 10.96 Å, b = 10.01 Å, c = 8.53 Å, alpha = 89.70°, beta = 100.40°, gamma = 90.48°

== Optical properties ==
Vlasovite is colorless, pink, pale brown or silvery in reflected light and colourless in transmitted light. The border zones of large grains are light brown due to dust-like inclusions. It is transparent to translucent, with a white streak and greasy luster, vitreous to pearly on cleavage surfaces. The refractive indices are N_{x} = 1.607, N_{y} = 1.623 and N_{z} = 1.628, similar to those of muscovite.

Vlasovite is not fluorescent, but altered portions of the material fluoresce orange-yellow under both long-wave and short-wave ultra-violet illumination.

== Physical properties ==
Crystals have been found up to 15 cm long, but vlasovite occurs more commonly as irregularly shaped grains and aggregates. It shows distinct cleavage parallel to the plane containing the a and c crystal axes, and this plane can also be a twin plane, although twinning is uncommon. Vlasovite is a brittle mineral, with an irregular to conchoidal fracture, hardness 6 and specific gravity 2.97. It is nearly insoluble in hydrochloric acid HCl and nitric acid HNO_{3}, but it dissolves easily in a mixture of hydrofluoric acid, HF, and sulfuric acid H_{2}SO_{4}.

== Environment ==
Vlasovite is a late phase in nepheline syenite and syenitic pegmatites. At Ascension Island it is found in miarolitic cavities in ejected blocks of peralkaline granite (Peralkaline rocks are deficient in aluminium but have sodium and potassium in excess of the amount needed to form feldspar). At the Lovozero Massif in Russia it is formed in areas of rock rich in microcline and albite in the contact zone between pegmatites and fenites (metasomatic rocks composed of alkaline feldspar, sodic pyroxene and alkaline amphibole), by the replacement of eudialyte. Associated minerals include arfvedsonite, aegirine, apatite and fluorite, in addition to microcline, albite and eudialyte.

== Localities ==
The type locality is the Vavnbed Mountain, Lovozero Massif, Kola Peninsula, Murmanskaja Oblast', Northern Region, Russia, which is also a good locality for zircon crystals. Other localities for vlasovite include the volcanic Ascension Island, in the South Atlantic Ocean, the Kipawa Complex, Villedieu Township, Quebec and the Strange Lake Complex in Labrador. Type material is conserved for reference in two locations in Russia, the Saint Petersburg Mining Institute and the Fersman Mineralogical Museum in Moscow, and also in France, at the National School of Mines in Paris.
