= Tumcha =

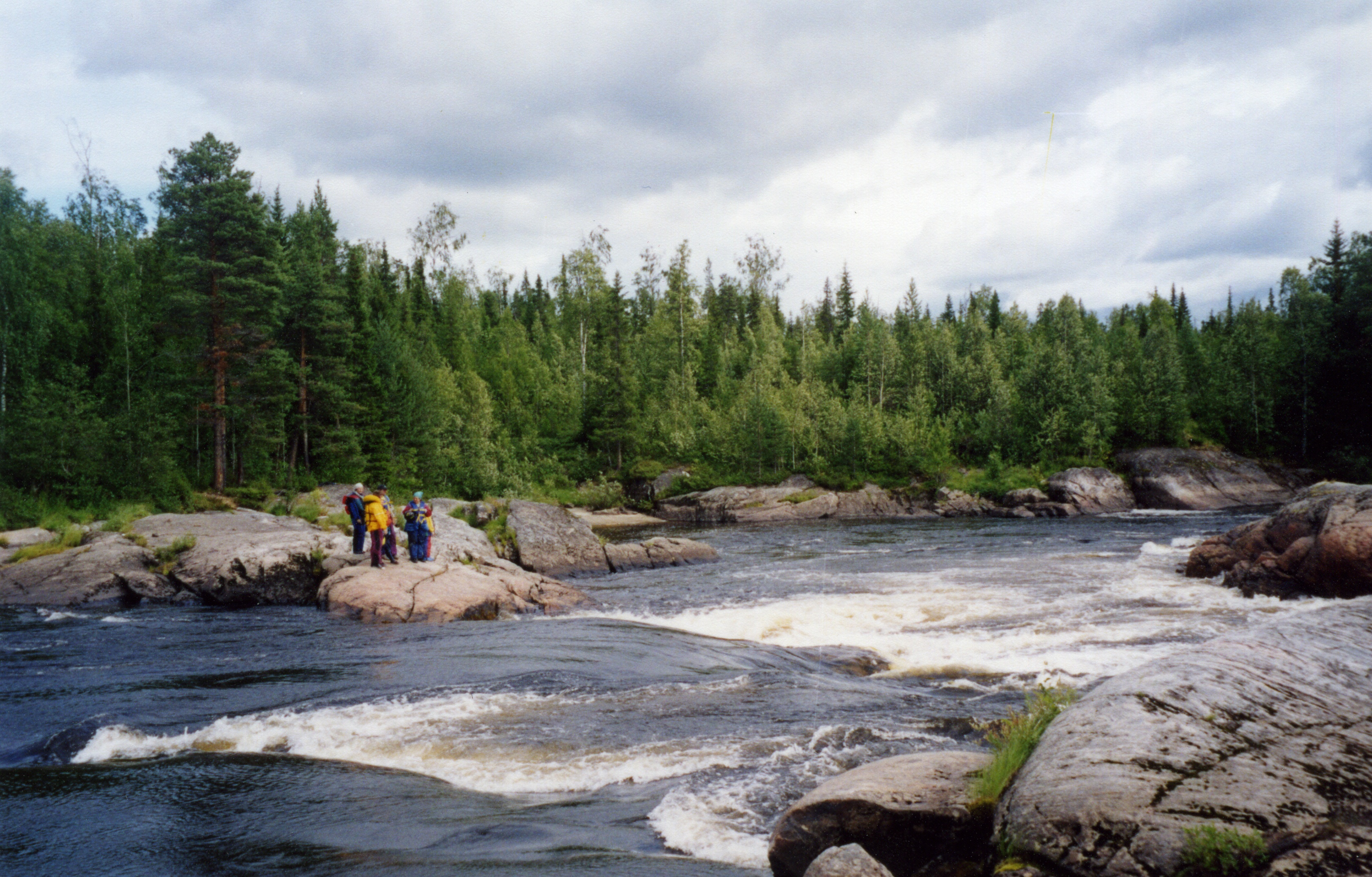

Location
- Country: Russia

Physical characteristics
- Mouth: Iova Reservoir
  - coordinates: 66°40′28″N 30°40′20″E
- Length: 20 km (12 mi)
- Basin size: 5,240 km^{2} (2,020 sq mi)

Basin features
- Progression: Iova Reservoir→ Kovda→ White Sea

The Tumcha (Russian: Тумча, Finnish: Tuntsajoki) is a river in the south of the Kola Peninsula in Murmansk Oblast, Russia. It is 20 kilometers (12 mi) in length. The area of its basin is 5,240 square kilometers (2,020 sq mi). The river originates in the confluence of the rivers Kutsayoki and Tuntsayoki and flows into the Iova Reservoir which is drained by the Kovda. A mineral, tumchaite, is named after the river.
