= Ulrichite =

Uranyl phosphate mineral

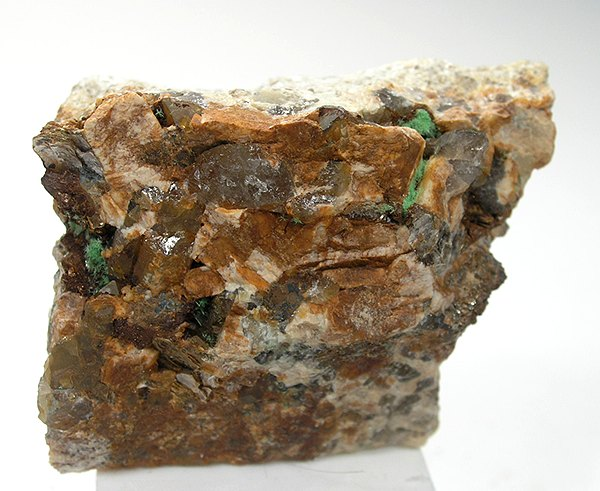
- Ulrichite (three green vugs)

General
- Category: Phosphate mineral
- Formula: CaCu(UO_{2})[PO_{4}]_{2}·4H_{2}O
- IMA symbol: Ulr
- Strunz classification: 8.EA.15
- Crystal system: Monoclinic
- Crystal class: Prismatic (2/m) (same H-M symbol)
- Space group: P2_{1}/c

Identification
- Other characteristics: Radioactive

Ulrichite is a rare green uranium phosphate mineral (CaCu(UO_{2})[PO_{4}]_{2}·4H_{2}O). It crystallizes as monoclinic prisms which occur as apple green acicular radiating clusters. It is radioactive and exhibits strong yellow fluorescence under ultraviolet radiation.

Ulrichite was first described in 1988 for samples from the Lake Boga granite quarry, Lake Boga, Victoria, Australia. It was named for George H. F. Ulrich (1830–1900), a 19th-century government geologist and mines department inspector. The type locality at Lake Boga is the only reported occurrence and the type specimen is located at the Museum Victoria, Melbourne, Australia, as #M38576.

It is of secondary origin in granite pegmatites where it is found in miarolitic cavities. It occurs associated with turquoise, chalcosiderite, cyrilovite, torbernite, libethenite, sampleite, saleeite and fluorapatite.
