= Uranocircite =

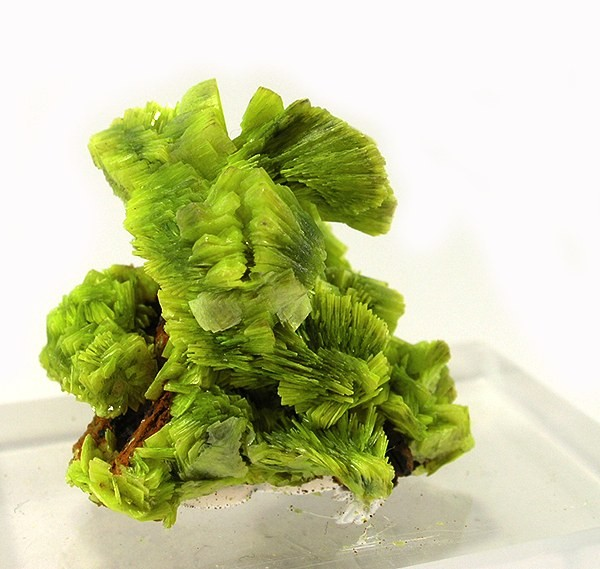
- Uranocircite

General
- Category: Phosphate mineral
- Formula: Ba(UO_{2})_{2}(PO_{4})_{2}·10H_{2}O
- IMA symbol: Urc-II
- Strunz classification: 8.EB.05
- Crystal system: Tetragonal
- Crystal class: Ditetragonal dipyramidal (4/mmm); H-M symbol: (4/m 2/m 2/m)
- Space group: I4/mmm
- Unit cell: a = 7.01, c = 20.46 [Å]; Z = 2

Identification
- Other characteristics: Radioactive

Uranocircite or Uranocircite-II is a uranium mineral with the chemical formula: Ba(UO_{2})_{2}(PO_{4})_{2}·10H_{2}O. Uranocircite-I was discredited (the IMA-CMNMC published 'The New IMA List of Minerals', September 2012). It is a phosphate mineral which contains barium and is a green to yellow colour. It has a Mohs hardness of about 2.

The "circ" in the name uranocircite is from the ancient Greek word for "falcon", because it was discovered in Falkenstein, Germany. Uranocircite contains about 45% uranium, and is mainly mined in Bergen in Saxony, Germany.
