= List of contemporary ethnic groups of North America =

List of North American ethnic groups

The following is a list of contemporary ethnic groups of North America. There has been constant debate over the classification of ethnic groups. Membership of an ethnic group tends to be associated with shared ancestry, history, homeland, language or dialect and cultural heritage; where the term "culture" specifically includes aspects such as religion, mythology and ritual, cuisine, dressing (clothing) style and other factors.

By the nature of the concept, ethnic groups tend to be divided into subgroups, may themselves be or not be identified as independent ethnic groups depending on the source consulted.

North America here is considered to be approximately delimited from Europe by the Greenland Sea (extending east to Svalbard, Jan Mayen, and Iceland along the Fram and Denmark straits); from South America by the Darién Gap and the portion of the Caribbean Sea north of Aruba, Bonaire, Curaçao, Nueva Esparta, Providencia, San Andrés, Trinidad, and Tobago; from Asia by the Chukchi Sea, Bering Strait, and Bering Sea (along the Baker-Shevardnadze line); and from Oceania by the Polynesian Triangle and Micronesia.

== Ethnic groups ==
The following groups are commonly identified as "ethnic groups", as opposed to ethno-linguistic phyla, national groups, racial groups or similar.

Ethnicity	Language(s)	Primary homeland	Subgroups, tribes & castes	Religion(s)
Abenaki	Algic → Algonquian → Western Abenaki; Historically Algic → Algonquian → Eastern Abenaki	Canada (Quebec), United States (Maine, New Hampshire, Vermont)	Western Abenaki (including Cowasuck, Missiquoi, Wabanaki Nation (Odanak, Wôlinak)), Eastern Abenaki (including Penobscot, Wolastoqiyik)	Abenaki religion
Achi'	Mayan → Quichean → Achi	Guatemala (Baja Verapaz)	Rabinal, Cubulco	Christianity, Mayan religion
African-Americans	Indo-European → Germanic → English → American English, Samaná English; Indo-European → French-based creoles → Louisiana Creole; Indo-European → English-based creoles → Gullah, Afro-Seminole Creole; Francosign → ASLic → American Sign → Black American Sign	United States, Mexico (Coahuila), Dominican Republic (Samaná Province)	Black Southerners, Creoles of color, Black Native Americans (including Freedmen (including Black Seminoles (including Mascogos), Cherokee Freedmen, Choctaw Freedmen, Creek Freedmen)), Gullah (including Freshwater Gullah and Saltwater Gullah), Samaná Americans, Affrilachians, Afro-Romani Americans, Brandywine, along with significant populations in Canada	Christianity → Protestantism → Black church Hoodoo, Islam
Afro-Anguillians	Indo-European → Germanic → English; Indo-European → English-based creoles → Antiguan and Barbudan Creole → Anguillian Creole	Anguilla		Christianity
Afro–Antiguans and Barbudans	Indo-European → Germanic → English → Antiguan and Barbudan English; Indo-European → English-based creoles → Antiguan and Barbudan Creole	Antigua and Barbuda	Antiguans, Barbudans	Christianity → Catholicism, Protestantism → Anglicanism, Methodism, Calvinism, Baptist
Afro-Arubans	Indo-European → Portuguese-based creoles → Papiamento; Indo-European → Germanic → Dutch, English; Indo-European → Romance → Spanish	Aruba		Christianity
Afro-Bahamians	Indo-European → Germanic → English → Bahamian English; Indo-European → English-based creoles → Bahamian Creole	The Bahamas		Christianity
Afro-Barbadians	Indo-European → Germanic → English → Bajan English; Indo-European → English-based creoles → Bajan Creole	Barbados		Christianity
Afro-Bermudians	Indo-European → Germanic → English → Bermudian English; Indo-European → English-based creoles → Jamaican Patois → Bermudian Creole	Bermuda		Christianity
Afro–Costa Ricans	Indo-European → Romance → Spanish → Costa Rican Spanish; Indo-European → English-based creoles → Limonese Creole	Costa Rica (Puerto Limon, San Jose, Alajuela, Heredia)		Christianity → Catholicism, Protestantism
Afro-Cubans	Indo-European → Romance → Portuguese, Spanish → Cuban Spanish; Indo-European → Germanic → English; Cuban Sign Language; Atlantic–Congo → Yoruboid → Lucumí; Atlantic–Congo and Indo-European → Kongo and Bozal Spanish → Habla Congo; Historically Indo-European → Spanish-based creoles → Bozal Spanish	Cuba	Ganga-Longoba, Afro-Cuban Roma, Arará	Christianity → Catholicism, Protestantism; Afro-American religions: Abakuá, Arará, Cuban Vodú, Palo, Santería
Afro-Curaçaoans	Indo-European → Germanic → Dutch, English; Indo-European → Portuguese-based creoles → Papiamento; Indo-European → Romance → Spanish	Curaçao		Christianity
Afro-Dominicans (Dominica)	Indo-European → Germanic → English; Indo-European → French-based creoles → Dominican Creole French; Francosign → ASLic → American Sign → Dominican Sign	Dominica		Christianity → Catholicism, Protestantism
Afro-Dominicans (Dominican Republic)	Indo-European → Romance → Spanish → Dominican Spanish; Francosign → ASLic → Dominican (Republic) Sign	Dominican Republic		Christianity → Protestantism, Catholicism; Dominican Vudú
Afro-Grenadians	Indo-European → English-based creoles → Grenadian Creole English; Indo-European → French-based creoles → Grenadian Creole French	Grenada		Christianity → Catholicism, Protestantism; Afro-American religions, Traditional African religions, Islam
Afro-Guatemalans	Indo-European → Romance → Spanish → Guatemalan Spanish; Indo-European → Germanic → English; Arawakan → Ta-Arawakan → Garifuna	Guatemala (Livingston, Puerto Barrios, and Santo Tomas)		Christianity → Catholicism, Protestantism
Afro-Haitians	Indo-European → Romance → French → Haitian French; Indo-European → French-based creoles → Haitian Creole	Haiti		Christianity → Catholicism, Haitian Voudou
Afro-Jamaicans	Indo-European → Germanic → English → Jamaican English; Indo-European → English-based creoles → Jamaican Patois, Jamaican Maroon Creole	Jamaica		Christianity, Convince, Jamaican Maroon religion, Kumina, Rastafari, Myal
Afro–Kittitians and Nevisians	Indo-European → Germanic → English; Indo-European → English-based creoles → Antiguan and Barbudan Creole → Saint Kitts Creole	Saint Kitts and Nevis		Christianity, Rastafari
Afro-Mexicans	Indo-European → Romance → Spanish → Mexican Spanish	Mexico (Guerrero, Lázaro Cárdenas, Huetamo, Oaxaca, Veracruz, Greater Mexico City, Guadalajara and Múzquiz Municipality), United States (Southwestern United States)	Mascogos, Blaxicans	Christianity → Catholicism, Protestantism; Afro-American religions
Afro-Nicaraguans	Indo-European → Romance → Spanish → Nicaraguan Spanish; Indo-European → English-based creoles → Moskitian Creole, Rama Cay Creole	Nicaragua		Christianity → Catholicism
Afro-Panamanians	Indo-European → Romance → Spanish → Panamanian Spanish; Indo-European → English-based creoles → Jamaican Patois → Bocas del Toro Creole; Historically Indo-European → French-based creoles → San Miguel Creole	Panama		Christianity → Catholicism
Afro–Puerto Ricans	Indo-European → Romance → Spanish → Puerto Rican Spanish; Indo-European → Germanic → Puerto Rican English; Atlantic–Congo → Yoruboid → Lucumí (lithurgical language); Atlantic–Congo and Indo-European → Kongo and Bozal Spanish → Habla Congo; Historically Indo-European → Spanish-based creoles → Bozal Spanish	United States (Puerto Rico)		Christianity → Catholicism, Protestantism; African diaspora religions, Animism
Afro–Saint Lucians	Indo-European → French-based creoles → Saint Lucian Creole	Saint Lucia		Christianity, Kélé
Afro-Salvadorans	Indo-European → Romance → Spanish → Salvadoran Spanish	El Salvador (Sonsonate, Ahuachapán, San Miguel, and La Unión)		Christianity → Catholicism, Protestantism; African diaspora religions, Rastafari
Afro–Trinidadians and Tobagonians	Indo-European → English-based creoles → Trinidadian Creole, Tobagonian Creole; Indo-European → Indo-Aryan → Caribbean Hindustani; Indo-European → Romance → Spanish → Trinidadian Spanish; Indo-European → French-based creoles → Antillean Creole; Indo-European → Germanic → English → Trinidadian and Tobagonian English	Trinidad and Tobago	Merikins, Cocoa panyols, Douglas	Christianity → Catholicism and Protestantism; Afro-American religions, Traditional African religions, Islam
Afro-Turks and Caicos Islanders	Indo-European → English Creole → Turks and Caicos Creole, [[Indo-European languages|Indo-European	Turks and Caicos Islands		Christianity → Protestantism
Afro-Vincentians	Indo-European → English-based creoles → Vincentian Creole	Saint Vincent and the Grenadines		Christianity
Afro–Virgin Islanders	Indo-European → English-based creoles → Virgin Islands Creole; Indo-European → Zeelandic-based creole → Negerhollands	Virgin Islands (United Kingdom, United States), SSS islands (Netherlands, France)		Christianity
Ahtna	Na-Dene → Athabaskan → Ahtna	United States (Alaska)	Taral Band, Klutina Band, Gakona Band, Mendeltna Band, Denali Band, Chistochina Band, Batzulnetas Band, Mentasta Band	Christianity, Native American religion
Alabamas	Muskogean → Alabama–Koasati → Alabama (Note: Due to the a long history of forced assimilation by the American government, the vast majority only speak English.)	United States (Alabama–Quassarte Tribal Town, Alabama–Coushatta Reservation) (Note: Following the passage of the Indian Removal Act, the Cherokee, the Choctaw, the Chickasaw, and the Muscogee were all forced to relocate their entire population to Oklahoma.)		Christianity → Protestantism; Ethnic religion
Alaskan Creoles	Indo-European → Slavic → Russian → Alaskan Russian; Indo-European → Germanic → English → American English	United States (Alaska)		Christianity → Eastern Orthodoxy → Russian Orthodoxy
Aleuts	Eskaleut → Aleut	United States (Aleutians East Borough, Aleutians West Census Area)		Christianity → Eastern Orthodoxy; Animism
Algonquin	Algic → Algonquian → Algonquin	Canada (Quebec, Ontario)		Midewiwin
Alsea	Alsea language	United States (Oregon)		Ethnic religion
Alutiiq	Eskaleut → Yupik → Alutiiq	United States (Alaska)	Chugach	Christianity
Amish	Indo-European → Germanic → Pennsylvania Dutch	United States	Old Order Amish (including Swiss Amish, Nebraska Amish, Swartzentruber Amish, Buchanan Amish, Andy Weaver Amish, Troyer Amish, Byler Amish, Renno Amish, Holmes Old Order Amish, Elkhart-LaGrange Amish, Lancaster Amish, Tobe Amish, and Michigan Amish), New Order Amish, Amish Mennonites (including Beachy Amish (including Old Beachy Amish), Kauffman Amish Mennonites, Egli Amish, Stuckey Amish), Para-Amish groups (including Lobelville Believers in Christ, Le Roy Plain Community, Manton Plain Community, Ghent Plain Community, Christian Communities, Vernon Community, Caneyville Christian Community)	Christianity → Anabaptism
Amuzgos	Oto-Manguean → Amuzgoan → Amuzgo	Mexico (Guerrero, Oaxaca)		Christianity → Catholicism
Anglo-Americans	Indo-European → Germanic → English → United States English, Canadian English, Bahamian English; Indo-European → English-based creoles → Bahamian Creole; Francosign → ASLic → American Sign	Anglo-America (Canada (except Inuit Nunangat), United States (except Puerto Rico), Commonwealth Caribbean (Antigua and Barbuda, The Bahamas, Belize, Dominica, Grenada, Jamaica, Saint Kitts and Nevis, Saint Lucia, Saint Vincent and the Grenadines, Trinidad and Tobago), British Overseas Territories in the North America (Anguilla, British Virgin Islands, Cayman Islands, Montserrat, Turks and Caicos Islands and Bermuda)	English Americans (including New England Americans, Middle Atlantic Americans, Midwestern Americans, Appalachians, Southern Americans (including Texians), Florida Conchs, High Tiders, Western Americans, Okies, West Coast Americans, Mormons, Anglo-Alaskans), Anglo-Canadians (including Ontarians, Anglo-Quebecers, Nova Scotians, New Brunswickers, Manitobans, British Columbians, Prince Edward Islanders, Saskatchewanians, Albertans, Newfoundlanders, Labradorians, Northwest Territorians, Yukoners, Anglo-Nunavummiut), Bahamas Conchs	Christianity → Catholicism, Mormonism, Protestantism → Anglicanism, Methodism, Calvinism, Evangelicalism, Baptists
Apache	Na-Dene → Athabaskan → Apachean (Note: Language family; with some exceptions, all speakers of the various languages within this family are typically seen as one singular ethnicity.) (Note: With the exception of Navajo, all Apachean speakers are seen as one ethnicity. However, due to a history of forced assimilation by the American government, the majority can only speak English.)	United States (Apacheria)	Chiricahua, Jicarilla, Lipan, Mescalero, Salinero, Plains Apache, Western Apache	Native American religions → Native American Church
Arapaho	Algic → Algonquian → Arapaho	United States (Colorado, Wyoming)		Christianity, Native American Church
Assiniboine	Siouan → Western Siouan → Assiniboine	Canada (Manitoba, Saskatchewan, Alberta), United States (North Dakota, Montana)	Bizebina, Insaombi, Wokpanbi	Traditional Assiniboine religion
Atikamekw	Algic → Algonquian → Atikamekw	Canada (Nitaskinan)		Christianity → Catholicism, Ethnic religion
Bay Islanders	Indo-European → Germanic → English → Bay Islands English; Indo-European → Romance → Spanish → Honduran Spanish; Bay Islands Sign Language	Honduras (Bay Islands, Atlántida, Colón)		Christianity → Catholicism, Protestantism
Békés	Indo-European → Romance → French	Martinique, Guadeloupe		Christianity → Catholicism
Belizean Creoles	Indo-European → English-based creoles → Belizean Creole; Indo-European → Germanic → English → Belizean English; Indo-European → Romance → Spanish → Belizean Spanish	Belize		Rastafari, Christianity → Protestantism
Black Canadians	Indo-European → Germanic → English → Canadian English; Indo-European → Romance → French → Canadian French	Canada (Ontario, Quebec, Alberta, British Columbia, Manitoba, Nova Scotia)	Black Ontarians (including Black Torontonians), Black Montrealers, Black New Brunswickers, Black Nova Scotians	Christianity, Islam
Blackfoot	Algic → Algonquian → Blackfoot	Canada (Alberta), United States (Montana)	Kainai, Piegan (including Northern Piegan, Southern Piegan), Siksika	Blackfoot religion, Native American Church, Christianity
Bokota	Chibchan → Buglere	Panama (Bocas del Toro)		Talamancan mythology
Boruca	Chibchan → Boruca, Brunca Sign Language	Costa Rica (Puntarenas)		Talamancan mythology
Bribri	Chibchan → Talamanca → Bribri, Bribri Sign	Costa Rica (Cordillera de Talamanca)		Talamancan mythology
Cabécar	Chibchan → Isthmus → Cabécar	Costa Rica (Cordillera de Talamanca)		Christianity, Talamancan mythology
Caddo	Caddoan → Caddo	United States (Oklahoma)		Peyote religion, Christianity
Cahuilla	Uto-Aztecan → Cupan → Cahuilla	United States (California)	Pass Cahuilla (including Agua Caliente Cahuilla, Morongo Cahuilla), Mountain Cahuilla (including Cahuilla Band of Indians, Los Coyotes Cahuilla, Ramona Cahuilla, Santa Rosa Cahuilla), Desert Cahuilla (including Augustine Cahuilla, Cabazon Cahuillla, Torres Martinez Desert Cahuilla)	Christianity → Catholicism, Protestantism → Moravian; Cahuilla mythology
Cayuga	Iroquoian → Northern Iroquoian → Cayuga	Canada (Ontario), United States (New York, Oklahoma)		Longhouse Religion
Chatinos	Oto-Manguean → Zapotecan → Chatino	Mexico (Oaxaca)		Christianity → Catholicism
Chemakum	Chemakuan → Chemakum	United States (Washington)		Ethnic religion
Chehalis	Historically Salishan → Coast Salish → Lower Chehalis, Upper Chehalis	United States (Washington)	Lower Chehalis, Upper Chehalis	Ethnic religion
Cherokee	Iroquoian → Southern Iroquoian → Cherokee	United States (North Carolina, Tennessee)	Cherokee Nation, Eastern Band, United Keetoowah Band, Cherokee Freedmen	Christianity, Cherokee religion, Four Mothers Society
Cheyennes	Algic → Algonquian → Cheyenne; Plains Indian Sign	United States (Montana, Oklahoma)		Native American religion, Native American Church, Christianity
Chichimeca Jonaz	Oto-Manguean → Oto-Pamean → Chichimeca Jonaz	Mexico (Guanajuato, and San Luis Potosi)		Christianity → Catholicism, Shamanism
Chickahominy		United States (Charles City County, Virginia)		Christianity
Chickasaw	Muskogean → Western Muskogean → Chickasaw	United States (Mississippi, Alabama, Tennessee)		Ethnic religion, Christianity → Protestantism
Chipewyan	Na-Dene → Athabaskan → Chipewyan	Canada (Saskatchewan, Northwest Territories, Alberta, Manitoba, British Columbia)		Christianity, Animism
Chitimacha	Chitimacha	United States (Louisiana)		Christianity → Catholicism
Choctaw	Muskogean → Choctaw	United States (Alabama, Florida, Mississippi, Louisiana)	Choctaw Freedmen, Nation of Oklahoma, Mississippi Band, Jena Band	Christianity, Choctaw religion
Ch'ol	Mayan → Cholan → Ch'ol	Mexico (Chiapas Highlands)		Christianity, Mayan religion
Chontal Maya	Mayan → Cholan → Chontal Maya	Mexico (Chontalpa)	Nacajuca, Tamulte, Macuspana, Centla	Christianity, Mayan religion
Ch'orti'	Mayan → Cholan → Ch'orti'	Guatemala, El Salvador, Honduras		Christianity → Catholicism, Maya religion
Chuj	Mayan → Q'anjobalan → Chuj	Guatemala (Huehuetenango Department), Mexico (Chiapas)		Christianity, Mayan religion
Chumash	Chumashan languages (Note: The last of the Chumashan languages went extinct in 1965 but revival efforts have been ongoing since 2010.)	United States (California)		Christianity, Chumash religion
Clatsop	Chinookan, Wakashan, and Indo-European → Lower Chinook, Nootka Jargon, Germanic, and Romance → Chinook Jargon historically Chinookan → Lower Chinook → Clatsop	United States (Oregon)		Native American religion
Cocopah	Yuman → Cocopah	Mexico (Baja California, Sonora), United States (Arizona)		Native American religion
Coeur d'Alene	Salishan → Interior Salish → Coeur d'Alene	United States (Washington)		Native American religion
Comanche	Uto-Aztecan → Numic → Comanche, Indo-European → Germanic → English	United States (Comancheria)		Native American Church, Christianity
Coos	Coosan	United States (Oregon)		Native American religion
Cora	Uto-Aztecan → Corachol → Cora	Mexico (Nayarit, Jalisco, Durango), United States (Colorado, Nevada, Utah, Arizona)		Native American religion, Peyotism, Christianity → Catholicism
Coushatta	Muskogean → Alabama–Koasati → Koasati	United States (Coushatta Indian Reservation, Alabama–Coushatta Reservation, Alabama–Quassarte Tribal Town)		Christianity
Cree	Algic → Algonquian → Cree (Note: Due to the a long history of forced assimilation by the Canadian government, the vast majority can only either speak English.)	Canada (Alberta, Saskatchewan, Manitoba, Ontario, Quebec, Newfoundland and Labrador)	James Bay Cree, Moose Cree, Swampy Cree, Woodland Cree, Papaschase	Christianity, Cree religion
Crow	Siouan → Western Siouan → Crow	United States (Montana)		Christianity, Crow religion
Dakota	Siouan → Sioux → Dakota	United States (South Dakota, North Dakota, Minnesota, Nebraska, Montana), Canada (Saskatchewan, Manitoba)	Santee, Yankton-Yanktonai	Native American Religions
Dane-zaa	Na-Dene → Athabaskan → Dane-zaa	Canada (British Columbia, Alberta)		Christianity, Native American religion
Deg Xit'an	Na-Dene → Athabaskan → Deg Xinag	United States (Alaska)		Christianity
Dena'ina	Na-Dene → Athabaskan → Dena'ina	United States (Alaska)		Christianity → Eastern Orthodoxy, Animism
Dominickers	Indo-European → Germanic → English → American English	United States (Holmes County, Florida)		Christianity
Duwamish	Salishan → Coast Salish → Lushootseed	United States (Washington)		Christianity, Native American religion
Eel River Athapaskans	Na-Dene → Athabaskan → Wailaki	United States (California)		Native American religion
Eyak	Na-Dene → Athabaskan → Eyak; Indo-European → Germanic → English	United States (Alaska)		Christianity
Fox	Algic → Algonquian → Fox	United States (Iowa, Kansas, Nebraska, Oklahoma, formerly Michigan, Wisconsin)	Sac and Fox Nation (Oklahoma), Sac and Fox Nation of Missouri in Kansas and Nebraska, Sac and Fox Tribe of the Mississippi in Iowa	Native American religion
Franco-Americans	Indo-European → Romance → French → American French; Indo-European → French-based creoles → Louisiana Creole; Francosign → French Sign and American Sign → Quebec Sign; Indo-European → Germanic → English → Cajun English historically Indo-European → French-based creoles → Alabama Creole	French America (Canada, United States (Louisiana, Alabama, Missouri, Mississippi), Saint Pierre and Miquelon)	Saint-Pierrais and Miquelonnais, French Canadians (including Quebecois, Acadians (including Chiac), Franco-Terreneuvians, Franco-Ontariens, Franco-Manitobains, Fransaskois, Franco-Albertains, Franco-Colombiens, Franco-Yukonnais, Franco-Tenois, Franco-Nunavois, Brayons, Muskrat French, French-Canadian Americans), French Louisianians (including Louisiana Creoles (including Louisiana Cajuns and Louisiana Creoles of color), Alabama Creoles (including Alabama Cajuns), Arkansas Creoles, and Missouri Creoles)	Christianity → Catholicism; Louisiana Voodoo
Gabrieleños	Indo-European → Germanic → English; Indo-European → Romance → Spanish; Uto-Aztecan → Takic → Gabrieleno (Note: The Gabrieleno language went extinct around 1900, but revival efforts have been ongoing since the 2000s. Most are fluent in English and/or Spanish)	United States (California)		Native American religion, Christianity
Garifunas	Arawakan → Ta-Arawakan → Garifuna; Indo-European → English-based creoles → Vincentian Creole, Belizean Creole	Saint Vincent and the Grenadines, (Note: Following the Second Carib War, the majority of the Garifuna were deported to Honduras, where they later spread to Guatemala, Belize, and Nicaragua. Since then, Honduras has seen high murder rates, causing many to flee to United States.) Honduras, Belize, Guatemala, Nicaragua	Significant populations in the United States	Christianity → Catholicism
Gitxsan	Tsimshianic → Nass–Gitksan → Gitxsan	Canada (Skeena Country)		Native American religion
Gros Ventre	Algic → Algonquian → Gros Ventre	United States (Montana)		Sun Dance
Guarijio	Uto-Aztecan → Tarahumaran → Guarijio	Mexico (Chihuahua, Sonora)		Native American religion
Guna	Chibchan → Isthmus → Guna	Panama (Guna Yala)		Native American religion
Gwich'in	Na-Dene → Athabaskan → Gwich'in	Canada (Yukon Territory, Northwest Territories), United States (Alaska)		Native American religion
Haida	Haida languages, historically Haida Jargon	Canada (Haida Gwaii), United States (Prince of Wales Island)	Kaigani Haida	Haida Traditional Faith
Haisla	Wakashan → Northern → Haisla	Canada (British Columbia)		Native American religion
Hän	Na-Dene → Athabaskan → Han	Canada (Yukon Territory), United States (Alaska)		Native American religion
Heiltsuk	Wakashan → Northern Wakashan → Heiltsuk–Oowekyala → Heiltsuk	Canada (Central Coast Regional District)		Native American religion
Hispanic Americans	Indo-European → Romance → Spanish → American Spanish	Hispanic North America (Mexico, Guatemala, Cuba, Dominican Republic, Honduras, Nicaragua, El Salvador, Costa Rica, Panama, United States (Puerto Rico, Texas, New Mexico, California, Arizona, Colorado, Florida, Louisiana), Belize)	Mexicans (including Northeastern Mexicans, Northwestern Mexicans, Baja Californians, Western Mexicans, Abajeno, Central Mexicans, Southern Mexican, Coastal Mexican, Chiapaneco, Yucateco, Basque-Mexican, Mexican-American), Guatemalans (Guatemalan-American), Cubans (including Cuban Americans), Dominicans (Dominican-American), Honduran (Honduran-American), Nicaraguan (Nicaraguan-American), Salvadoran (Caliche, Salvadoran-American), Costa Rican (Costa Rican-American), Panamanians (including Panamanian Americans), Isleños, Hispanic-Belizean, Puerto Ricans, Hispanic Americans in the United States (including Chicanos, Nuyoricans), colonial-era Hispanos in the US and their modern descendants (Tejanos, Californios, Nuevomexicanos, Floridanos, Louisiana Isleños, Louisiana Spanish-Creoles), Spanish Americans (Asturian Americans, Basque Americans, Catalan Americans, Canarian Americans, Galician Americans), along with the Latin American diaspora	Christianity → Catholicism
Ho-Chunk	Siouan → Western Siouan → Ho-Chunk	United States (Wisconsin, Nebraska, Iowa, Minnesota)	Ho-Chunk Nation of Wisconsin, Winnebago Tribe of Nebraska	Native American religion, Native American Church, Christianity
Holikachuk	Na-Dene → Athabaskan → Holikachuk	United States (Alaska)		Christianity, Animism
Hopi	Uto-Aztecan → Northern → Hopi	United States (Hopi Reservation)		Christianity, Native American Church
Huave	Huave	Mexico (Oaxaca)	San Dionisio del Mar Huave, San Francisco del Mar Huave, San Mateo del Mar Huave, San María del Mar Huave	Native American religion, Christianity → Catholicism
Huichols	Uto-Aztecan → Corachol → Huichol	Mexico (Nayarit, Jalisco, Durango, Zacatecas and San Luis Potosi), United States (California, Arizona, New Mexico, and Texas)		Native American religion, Peyotism, Christianity → Catholicism
Hutterites	Indo-European → Germanic → Hutterite German	Great Plains (United States, Canada)	Schmiedeleut, Lehrerleut, Dariusleut	Christianity → Protestantism → Anabaptism
Indo-Caribbeans	Indo-European → Germanic → English → English Creole; Indo-European → Romance → Spanish → Caribbean Spanish; Indo-European → Romance → French → French Creole; Indo-European → Germanic → Dutch → Surinamese Dutch; Indo-European → Indo-Aryan → Hindustani → Caribbean Hindustani; Dravidian → Tamiloid → Tamil	Caribbean	Indo-Barbadians, Indo-Dominicans, Indo-Grenadians, Indo-Guadeloupeans, Indo-Haitians, Indo-Jamaicans, Indo-Martiniquais, Indo-Kittitians and Indo-Nevisians, Indo-Saint Lucians, Indo-Trinidadian and Tobagonians, Indo-Vincentians, Indo-Belizeans, with significant populations in the United States	Hinduism, Christianity, Islam, Sikhism, Jainism, Buddhism, Zoroastrianism, Baháʼí
Innu	Algic → Algonquian → Innu-aimun, Naskapi	Canada (Nitassinan)	Naskapi (including Kawawachikamach Naskapi, Mushuau Naskapi), Nutashkuan Innu, Ekuanitshit Innu, Mushuau Innu, Sheshatshiu Innu, Matimekush-Lac John Innu, Uashat–Mani-Utenam Innu, Essipit Innu, Pekuakamiulnuatsh Innu, Pessamit Innu, Pakuashipi Innu, Unamenshipit Innu	Animism
Inughuit	Eskaleut → Inuit → Inuktun	Danish Realm (Avannaa)		Christianity, Inuit religion
Inuktitut	Eskaleut → Inuit → Inuktitut	Canada (Nunavut)	Iglulingmiut, Kivallirmiut, Aivilingmiut	Christianity, Inuit religion
Inupiat	Eskaleut → Inuit → Inupiaq	United States (North Slope Borough, Northwest Arctic Borough, Nome Census Area)	Sivunmiut, Qawiaraq Inupiat, Nunamiut, Malimiut, Taġiuġmiut	Christianity, Inuit religion
Inuvialuit	Eskaleut → Inuit → Inuvialuktun	Canada (Inuvialuit Settlement Region)	Sallirmiut, Kangiryuarmiut, Uummarmiut, Copper Inuit, Kangiryuatjagmiut, Siglit, Ahiagmiut, Ekalluktogmiut, Akuliakattagmiut, Asiagmiut, Haneragmiut, Haningayogmiut, Kaernermiut, Kilusiktogmiut, Kogluktogmiut, Kugaryuagmiut, Pallirmiut, Pingangnaktogmiut, Ugyuligmiut, Umingmuktogmiut	Christianity, Inuit religion
Iowa	Siouan → Western Siouan → Chiwere	United States (Kansas, Nebraska, Oklahoma)	Iowa Tribe of Oklahoma, Iowa Tribe of Kansas and Nebraska	Native American religion, Native American Church, Christianity
Itza	Mayan → Yucatecan → Itza'	Guatemala (Petén Department)		Christianity, Mayan religion
Ixcatec	Oto-Manguean → Popolocan → Ixcatec	Mexico (Oaxaca)		Christianity → Catholicism; Native American religion
Ixil	Mayan → Mamean → Ixil	Guatemala (Ixil Community), Mexico (Campeche, Quintana Roo)	Chajuleño, Nebajeño	Christianity, Mayan religion
Jamaican Maroons	Indo-European → Germanic → English → Jamaican Patois, Jamaican Maroon Creole	Jamaica		Kumfu
Kalaallit	Eskaleut → Inuit languages → Kalaallisut	Danish Realm (Kitaa)		Christianity, Inuit religion
Kablunângajuit	Indo-European → Germanic → English → Newfoundland English	Canada (Nunatsiavut)		Christianity
Kalapuya	Kalapuyan	United States (Oregon)	Tualatin, Yamhill, Ahantchuyuk, Luckiamute, Santiam, Chepenefa, Chemapho, Tsankupi, Mohawk (Oregon), Chafan, Chelamela, Winefelly, Yoncalla	Native American religion
Kalinago	Indo-European → Germanic → English (Note: The indigenous Kalinago language became extinct in the 1920s. However, an offshoot of it known as Garifuna is still spoken today.); Arawakan → Ta-Arawakan → Kalinago → Garifuna; Indo-European → English-based creoles → Vincentian Creole	Lesser Antilles		Christianity → Catholicism
Kaqchikel	Mayan → Quichean → Kaqchikel	Guatemala (Chimaltenango, Sololá, Sacatepéquez, Guatemala Department), Mexico (Chiapas, Campeche)		Christianity, Mayan religion
Karuks	Karuk language	United States (California)		Christianity
Kaska Dena	Na-Dene → Athabaskan → Kaska	Canada (British Columbia, Yukon Territory)		Native American religion
Kaw	Siouan → Western Siouan → Dhegihan → Kansa	United States (Oklahoma, Kansas)		Christianity, Native American Church, Native American religion
Keres	Keresan languages, Keresan Sign Language	United States (Sandoval County and Cibola County, New Mexico)	Eastern Keres (including Dámáyámʾé, Dîiwʾamʾé, Katishtya, Kʾúutìimʾé, Tsʾíiyʾamʾé) Western Keres (including Áakʾùumʾé, Kʾáwáigamʾé)	Syncretised form of Christianity and Pueblo religion
K'iche'	Mayan → Quichean → K'iche'	Guatemala (Quiche, Totonicapan, Quetzaltenango, Solola, Suchitepequez, Retalhuleu), Mexico (Chiapas)	Central, East, North, West, South	Christianity, Maya religion
Kickapoo	Algic → Algonquian → Kickapoo	United States (Kansas, Oklahoma, Texas), Mexico (Coahuila, Sonora, Durango)	Tribu Kikapú, Kickapoo Tribe in Kansas, Kickapoo Traditional Tribe of Texas, Kickapoo Tribe of Oklahoma	Native American Church, Christianity
Kikiallus	Salishan → Coast Salish → Lushootseed	United States (Washington)		Christianity, Native American religion
Kiliwa	Yuman-Cochimi → Kiliwa	Mexico (Baja California)		Native American religion
Kiowa	Tanoan → Kiowa	United States (Oklahoma)		Christianity, Native American Church
Klallam	Salishan → Coast Salish → Klallam	United States (Olympic Peninsula, Kitsap Peninsula), Canada (Vancouver Island)	Lower Elwha Klallam, Jamestown S'Klallam, Port Gamble S'Klallam, Scia'new Klallam	Christianity, Shamanism
Koyukon	Na-Dene → Athabaskan → Koyukon	United States (Alaska)		Christianity, Animism
Kwakwaka'wakw	Wakashan → Northern Wakashan → Kwak'wala	Canada (British Columbia)		Native American religion
Lacandon	Mayan → Yucatecan → Lacandon	Mexico (Lacandon Jungle)		Christianity, Mayan religion
Lakota	Siouan → Sioux → Lakota	United States (North Dakota, South Dakota), Canada (Saskatchewan, Manitoba)	Sicangu, Oglala, Sans Arc, Hunkpapa, Miniconjou, Sihasapa	Lakota Religion, Christianity
Lenape	Algic → Algonquian → Munsee; Historically Algic → Algonquian → Unami	United States, Canada	Munsee (including Christian Munsee (including Delaware Nation at Moraviantown), Stockbridge Munsee, Munsee-Delaware Nation), Delaware Nation, Delaware Tribe of Indians, Lenape Indian Tribe of Delaware, Delaware of Six Nations, Nanticoke Lenni-Lenape Tribal Nation, Ramapough Mountain Indians	Traditional Lenape religion
Lenca	Macro-Chibchan → Lencan, Indo-European → Romance → Spanish → Honduran Spanish, Salvadoran Spanish	Honduras, El Salvador		Christianity → Catholicism, Sovereign Tribal Custom
Lillooet	Salishan → Interior Salish → Lillooet	Canada (British Columbia)	Upper Lillooet, Lower Lillooet, Lakes Lillooet	Christianity, Native American religion
Lower Cowlitz	Historically Salishan → Coast Salish → Cowlitz	United States (Cowlitz Reservation, Quinault Reservation, Chehalis Reservation)		Native American religion
Lower Skagit	Salishan → Coast Salish → Lushootseed	United States (Washington)		Christianity, Native American religion
Lumbee	Indo-European → Germanic → English → Lumbee English	United States (North Carolina)		Christianity
Makah	Wakashan → Southern Wakashan → Makah	United States (Washington)		Native American religion
Mam	Mayan → Mamean → Mam	Guateamala (Guatemalan Highlands)		Christianity, Mayan Religion
Mayangna	Misumalpan → Sumo	Nicaragua (Mosquito Coast)	Panamahka, Tawahka, Ulwa	Christianity
Mayles	Indo-European → Germanic → English → American English	United States (West Virginia)		Christianity → Protestantism
Mayo	Uto-Aztecan → Cahitan → Mayo	Mexico (Sonora, Sinaloa)		Christianity → Catholicism, Native American religion
Mazahua	Oto-Manguean → Oto-Pamean → Mazahua	Mexico (State of Mexico)		Christianity → Catholicism
Mazatec	Oto-Manguean → Popolocan → Mazatecan	Mexico (Oaxaca)	Ayautla	Christianity → Catholicism
Meherrin	Iroquoian → Nottoway	United States (North Carolina, Virginia)		
Melungeons	Indo-European → Germanic → English → Appalachian English	United States (Appalachia)	Carmel Indians	Christianity → Protestantism → Baptists
Mennonites	Indo-European → Germanic → German, Dutch, English	North America	Old Order Mennonites, Old Colony Mennonites, Amish Mennonites (including Beachy Amish (including Old Beachy Amish), Kauffman Amish Mennonites, Egli Amish, Stuckey Amish), with significant populations in Belize, El Salvador, and Mexico	Christianity → Anabaptism → Mennonitism
Menominee	Indo-European → Germanic → English; Algic → Algonquian → Menominee	United States (Wisconsin (Menominee Indian Reservation))	Keshena, Legend Lake, Middle Village, Neopit, Zoar	Christianity → Catholicism, Big Drum, Native American Church
Métis	Indo-European and Algic → Romance and Algonquian → French and Plains Cree → Michif; Indo-European → Romance → French → Metis French; Indo-European → Germanic → English → Bungi	Canada (Canadian Prairies, British Columbia, Northwest Territories, Northwestern Ontario), United States (Michigan, Illinois, Ohio, Minnesota, North Dakota, Montana)	Anglo-Metis, Little Shell Métis	Christianity
Mi'kmaq	Algic → Algonquian → Mi'kmaq	Canada (Mi'kma'ki), United States (Maine)	Mi'kmaq Nation, Miawpukek	Christianity → Catholicism
Miami	Algic → Algonquian → Miami–Illinois → Miami proper	United States (Illinois)	Indiana Miami, Oklahoma Miami, Piankeshaw	Christianity, Native American religion
Miccosukee	Muskogean → Mikasuki	United States (Miccosukee Indian Reservation)		Christianity, Native American religion
Miskito	Misumalpan → Miskito; Indo-European → English-based creoles → Moskitian Creole	Mosquito Coast (Nicaragua, Honduras)	Miskito Sambu	Christianity → Protestantism → Moravian Church
Missouria	Siouan → Western Siouan → Chiwere	United States (Oklahoma, previously Missouri)		Christianity, Native American Church
Mixe	Mixe–Zoque → Mixe	Mexico (Oaxaca)		Christianity → Catholicism
Mixtec	Oto-Manguean → Mixtecan → Mixtec	Mexico (La Mixteca)	Triqui, Cuicatecs, Amoltepec	Christianity → Catholicism
Mohawk	Iroquoian → Northern Iroquoian → Mohawk	Canada (Quebec, Ontario), United States (New York)		Animism, Christianity
Mohegan	Algic → Algonquian → Mohegan-Pequot	United States (Connecticut)		Christianity, Native American religion
Monacans	Historically Siouan → Ohio Valley Siouan → Tutelo (Note: Tutelo went extinct in 1982, leading most Monacans, Saponi, and Occaneechi to speak English. There has been some interest in reviving Tutelo in the 21st century.)	United States (Virginia, West Virginia, Maryland, Ohio)		Christianity
Mono	Uto-Aztecan → Numic → Mono	United States (California, Nevada)		Native American religion
Montaukett	Algic → Algonquian → Mohegan-Pequot	United States (Long Island)		Christianity, Native American religion
Mopan	Mayan → Yucatecan → Mopan	Belize, Guatemala		Christianity, Mayan religion
Muckleshoot	Salishan → Coast Salish → Lushootseed	United States (Washington)		Christianity, Native American religion
Muscogee	Muskogean → Muscogee, Muskogean → Eastern Muskogean → Mikasuki	United States (Alabama, Tennessee, Georgia)	Thlopthlocco, Kialegee, Muscogee Nation, Poarch Band, Lower Muskogee Creek Tribe, Creek Freedmen	Native American religion → Creek mythology, Four Mothers Society
Musqueam	Salishan → Coast Salish → Halkomelem	Canada (British Columbia)		Native American religion
Nahuas	Uto-Aztecan → Nahuan → Nahuatl	Mexico	Huasteca Nahuas, Mexicaneros, Sierra Puebla Nahuas, Guerrero Nahuas, Orizaba Nahuas, Southeastern Puebla Nahuas, Central Nahuas, Pipil (including Nicarao)	Christianity → Catholicism, Aztec religion
Nakoda	Siouan → Western Siouan → Stoney	Canada (Alberta, Saskatchewan)	Wood Stoney, Mountain Stoney	Christianity
Nanticoke	Algic → Algonquian → Nanticoke	United States (Maryland, Delaware)		Christianity
Narragansett	Algic → Algonquian → Narrangansett	United States (Rhode Island)		Christianity, Native American religion
Naso	Chibchan → Talamanca → Teribe	Panama (Bocas del Toro)		Native American religion
Natchez	Natchez language	United States (Oklahoma, South Carolina)	Eastern Band	Christianity, Native American religion
Navajo	Na-Dene → Apachean → Navajo; Navajo Family Sign	United States (Dinétah)		Christianity → Catholicism, Native American Church
Netsilik	Eskaleut → Inuit → Natsilingmiutut	Canada (Kugaaruk, Gjoa Haven)		Christianity, Inuit religion
Nez Perce	Plateau Penutian → Sahaptian → Nez Perce, Indo-European → Germanic → English	United States (Idaho, Washington)		Waashat Religion, Christianity
Ngabe	Chibchan → Guaymi	Panama (Ngabe-Bugle Comarca)		Christianity → Catholicism
Nipmucs	Historically Algic → Algonquian → Loup A, Massachusett	United States (Chaubunagungamaug Reservation, Hassanamisco Reservation)	Chaubunagungamaug Nipmuck, Hassanamisco Nipmuc, Nipmuc Nation	Manito, Christianity
Nisga'a	Tsimshianic → Nass–Gitksan → Nisga'a	Canada (British Columbia)		Native American religion
Nisqually	Salishan → Coast Salish → Lushootseed	United States (Washington)		Christianity, Native American religion
Nooksack	Salishan → Coast Salish → Nooksack	United States (Washington)		Native American religion, Christianity
Northern Paiute	Uto-Aztecan → Numic → Northern Paiute	United States (Nevada, Oregon)		Native American religion
Nottoway	Iroquoian → Nottoway			
NunatuKavummiut	Indo-European → Germanic → English → Newfoundland English	Canada (NunatuKavut)		Christianity → Protestantism → Evangelicalism; Animism
Nuu-chah-nulth	Wakashan → Southern Wakashan → Nuu-chah-nulth	Canada (British Columbia)		Native American religion
Nuxalk	Salishan → Nuxalk	Canada (British Columbia)		Native American religion
O'odham	Uto-Aztecan → Piman → O'odham	Mexico (Sonora), United States (Arizona)	Akimel O'odham, Tohono O'odham, Hia C-eḍ O'odham	Christianity → Catholicism, Native American religion
Odawa	Algic → Algonquian → Ottawa (Note: Due to a long history of forced assimilation by both American and Canadian governments, the vast majority can only speak English.)	Canada (Ontario), United States (Oklahoma, Michigan)		Midewiwin, Animism, Traditional religion, Christianity
Oji-Cree	Algic → Algonquian → Oji-Cree	Canada (Ontario, Manitoba)		Anishinaabe traditional beliefs, Christianity
Ojibwe	Algic → Algonquian → Ojibwe	Anishinaabeland (Canada, United States)	Mississaugas, Saulteaux, Findians	Midewiwin
Omaha	Siouan → Western Siouan → Dhegihan → Omaha-Ponca	United States (Nebraska, Iowa)		Christianity, Native American religion
Oneida	Iroquoian → Northern Iroquoian → Oneida	Canada (Ontario), United States (New York, Wisconsin)		Longhouse Religion
Onondaga	Iroquoian → Northern Iroquoian → Onondaga	Canada (Ontario), United States (New York)		Longhouse Religion, Kanoh'hon'io, Kahni'kwi'io, Christianity
Opata	Indo-European → Romance → Spanish; Historically Uto-Aztecan → Opata	Mexico (Sonora)	Eudeve, Teguima, Jova	Christianity → Catholicism
Osage	Siouan → Western Siouan → Dhegihan → Osage; Indo-European → Germanic → English; Indo-European → Romance → French	United States (Missouri, Oklahoma, Arkansas, Kansas)		Christianity, Inlonshka, Traditional Spirituality
Otoe	Siouan → Western Siouan → Chiwere	United States (Oklahoma, formerly Nebraska)		Native American Church, Christianity
Otomi	Oto-Manguean → Otomian → Otomi	Mexico (Hidalgo, Puebla, Veracruz, State of Mexico, Queretaro)		Christianity → Catholicism
Pame	Oto-Manguean → Oto-Pamean → Pame	Mexico (San Luis Potosi)	Northern Pame, Southern Pame, Central Pame	Native American religion, Christianity → Catholicism
Passamaquoddy	United States (Maine)	Algic → Algonquian → Maliseet-Passamaquoddy		Christianity, Native American religion
Patawomeck	Algic → Algonquian → Powhatan	United States (Virginia)		Christianity, Native American religion
Pawnee	Caddoan → Northern → Pawnee	United States (Oklahoma, formerly Kansas and Nebraska)		Christianity, Native American Church
Pennsylvania Dutch	Indo-European → Germanic → Pennsylvania Dutch; Indo-European → Germanic → English → Pennsylvania Dutch English	United States (Pennsylvania)	Schwenkfelders, River Brethren (including Yorker Brethren)	Christianity → Protestantism
Peoria	Algic → Algonquian → Miami–Illinois	United States (Oklahoma, formerly Illinois)		Christianity, Native American religion
Pequot	Algic → Algonquian → Mohegan-Pequot	United States (Connecticut)		Christianity, Native American religion
Piscataway	Algic → Algonquian → Piscataway	United States (Maryland, District of Columbia, Virginia, Pennsylvania, West Virginia)		Christianity → Catholicism
Pomo	Pomoan	United States (California)		Christianity, Native American religion
Ponca	Siouan → Western Siouan → Dhegihan → Omaha-Ponca	United States (Nebraska, Oklahoma)		Christianity, Native American Church
Poqomam	Mayan → Quichean → Poqomam	Guatemala (Alta Verapaz)		Christianity, Maya religion
Poqomchi	Mayan → Quichean → Poqomchi'	Guatemala (Baja Verapaz)		Christianity → Catholicism, Maya religion
Potawatomi	Algic → Algonquian → Potawatomi	Canada (Ontario, United States (Illinois, Indiana, Kansas, Michigan, Oklahoma, Wisconsin)		Midewiwin, Christianity → Catholicism, Protestantism → Methodism
Powhatan	Indo-European → Germanic → English; Historically Algic → Algonquian → Powhatan	United States (Tsenacommacah)		Christianity, Native American religion
Punjabi Mexican Americans	Indo-European → Germanic → English → American English	United States (California)		Hinduism, Sikhism, Islam, Christianity
Purepecha	Purépechan languages	Mexico (Michoacan)		Christianity → Catholicism
Puyallup	Salishan → Coast Salish → Lushootseed	United States (Washington)		Christianity, Native American religion
Q'anjob'al	Mayan → Q'anjobalan → Q'anjob'al	Guatemala (Huehuetenango Department), Mexico (Chiapas)		Christianity, Mayan religion
Quapaw	Siouan → Western Siouan → Dhegihan → Quapaw	United States (Oklahoma, formerly Arkansas)		Christianity, Native American religion, Native American Church
Quechan	Yuman → Quechan	United States (Arizona, California)		Native American religion, Christianity
Q'eqchi'	Mayan → Quichean → Q'eqchi	Guatemala (Alta Verapaz, Peten Department, Izabal Department, Baja Verapaz, Quiche Department), Belize (Toledo District), Mexico (Campeche, Quintana Roo, Chiapas	Western Q'eqchi, Eastern Q'eqchi	Christianity, Maya religion
Quileute	Chimakuan → Quileute	United States (Washington)		Native American religion
Rama	Chibchan → Rama; Indo-European → English-based creoles → Miskito Coast Creole → Rama Cay Creole	Nicaragua (Rama Cay)		Christianity → Protestantism → Moravian Church
Rappahannock	Algic → Algonquian → Powhatan	United States (Virginia]]		Christianity, Native American religion
Redbones	Indo-European → Germanic → English → American English	United States (Louisiana)		Christianity
Sac	Algic → Algonquian → Sauk	United States (Iowa, Kansas, Nebraska, Oklahoma, formerly Michigan, Wisconsin)	Sac and Fox Nation (Oklahoma), Sac and Fox Nation of Missouri in Kansas and Nebraska, Sac and Fox Tribe of the Mississippi in Iowa	Native American religion
Salinan	Salinan language	United States (California)		Native American religion
Sammamish	Salishan → Coast Salish → Lushootseed	United States (Washington)		Christianity, Native American religion
Sauk-Suiattle	Salishan → Coast Salish → Lushootseed	United States (Washington)	Sauk, Suiattle	Christianity, Native American religion
Sekani	Na-Dene → Athabaskan → Sekani	Canada (British Columbia)		Christianity, Animism
Seminoles	Muskogean → Muscogee → Seminole, Muskogean → Mikasuki, Afro-Seminole Creole	United States (Oklahoma, Florida), Mexico (Coahuila)	Oklahoma Seminoles, Black Seminoles (including Mascogos), Florida Seminoles	Christianity → Protestantism, Catholicism; Green Corn Ceremony
Seneca	Iroquoian → Northern Iroquoian → Seneca	Canada (Ontario), United States (New York, Oklahoma)		Longhouse Religion, Christianity
Seri	Seri	Mexico (Sonora)		Animism, Christianity
Serrano	Uto-Aztecan → Takic → Serrano	United States (California)	Mountain Serrano, Desert Serrano	Native American religion
Shawnee	Algic → Algonquian → Shawnee	United States (Oklahoma, historically Ohio)	Absentee Shawnee, Eastern Shawnee, Piqua Shawnee, Shawnee Tribe	Indigenous religion
Shinnecock	Algic → Algonquian → Mohegan-Pequot	United States (Long Island)		Christianity, Native American religion
Shoshone	Uto-Aztecan → Numic → Shoshoni	Wyoming, Idaho, Nevada, Utah (United States)	Eastern Shoshone, Northern Shoshone, Western Shoshone, Goshute	Native American Church, Christianity
Shuswap	Salishan → Interior Salish → Shuswap	Canada (Secwepemcúl̓ecw)	Setlemuk, Skstellnemuk, Stietamuk, Stkamlulepsemuk, Stlemhulehamuk, Texqa'kallt, Zaktcinemuk	Christianity, Native American religion
Sirenik	Eskaleut → Eskimo → Siberian Yupik, (Note: Due to the Sirenik language going extinct, Sirenik people have begun using the related Siberian Yupik language in its place.) historically Eskaleut → Eskimo → Sirenik	Russia (Sireniki)		Christianity, formerly shamanism
Skokomish	Salishan → Coast Salish → Twana	United States (Skokomish Indian Reservation)		Christianity → Indian Shaker Church
Skykomish	Salishan → Coast Salish → Lushootseed	United States (Washington)	Skykomish proper, Index	Christianity, Native American religion
Slavey	Na-Dene → Athabaskan → Slavey	Canada (Alberta, Northwest Territories)	Deh Cho, Sahtu	Christianity, Animism
Snohomish	Salishan → Coast Salish → Lushootseed	United States (Washington)		Christianity, Native American religion
Snoqualmie	Salishan → Coast Salish → Lushootseed	United States (Washington)		Christianity, Native American religion
South Carolina Turks	Indo-European → Germanic → English	United States (Dalzell, Sumter County, South Carolina)		Protestant Christianity
Southern Paiute	Uto-Aztecan → Numic → Colorado River Numic	United States (Arizona, California, Nevada, Utah)		Native American religion
Spokane	Salishan → Interior Salish → Spokane	United States (Spokane Indian Reservation)	Upper Spokane, Middle Spokane, Lower Spokane	Christianity, Native American religion, Dreamer Cult
Squamish	Salishan → Coast Salish → Squamish	Canada (British Columbia (North Vancouver (Squamish Nation)))	Senakw, X̱wáýx̱way, X̱wemelch'stn, Stawamus	Irreligion, Christianity
Squaxin Island Tribe	Salishan → Coast Salish → Lushootseed	United States (Washington)	Squaxin, Sahewamish, T'Peeksin, Squiaitl, Stechass, Nusechatl	Christianity, Native American religion
Steilacoom	Salishan → Coast Salish → Lushootseed	United States (Washington)	Steilacoom, Sastuck, Spanaway, Tlithlow, Sequalitchew	Christianity, Native American religion
Stillaguamish	Salishan → Coast Salish → Lushootseed	United States (Washington)		Christianity, Native American religion
Sto:lo	Salishan → Coast Salish → Halkomelem	Canada (British Columbia)	Aitchelitz, Leq'á:mel, Matsqui, Popkum, Skway, Skawahlook, Skowkale, Squiala, Sumas, Tzeachten, Yakweakwioose, Chawathil, Cheam, Kwantlen, Kwaw-kwaw-Apilt, Sq'éwlets, Seabird Island Band, Shxw'ow'hamel, Soowahlie, Skwah, Qayqayt, Kwikwetlem, Union Bar First Nation, Peters Band, Katzie, Sts'ailes, Yale First Nation	Christianity, Native American religion
Suquamish	Salishan → Coast Salish → Lushootseed	United States (Washington)		Christianity, Native American religion
Swinomish	Salishan → Coast Salish → Lushootseed	United States (Washington)		Christianity, Native American religion
Tagish	Na-Dene → Athabaskan → Tagish	Canada (Yukon)		Christianity, Animism
Tahltan	Na-Dene → Athabaskan → Tahltan	Canada (Northern British Columbia)		Christianity, Animism
Taidnapam	Historically Plateau Penutian → Sahaptian → Northwest Sahaptin → Upper Cowlitz; Chinookan, Wakashan, and Indo-European → Lower Chinook, Nootka Jargon, Germanic, and Romance → Chinook Jargon	United States (Yakama Indian Reservation)	Upper Cowlitz, Lewis River Cowlitz	Native American religion
Taino	Arawakan → Taino	Greater Antilles		Native American religion
Tanana Athabaskans	Na-Dene → Athabaskan → Upper Tanana, Na-Dene → Athabaskan → Lower Tanana, Na-Dene → Athabaskan → Tanacross	United States (Interior Alaska), Canada (Western Yukon)	Lower Tanana, Middle Tanana, Tanacross, Upper Tanana	Christianity, Shamanism
Taos	Tanoan → Tiwa → Taos	United States (Taos Pueblo)		Native American religion, Native American Church, Christianity
Tarahumara	Uto-Aztecan → Tarahumaran → Tarahumara	Mexico (Chihuahua)		Animism, Peyotism, Christianity → Catholicism
Tepehuán	Uto-Aztecan → Piman → Tepehuán	Mexico (Durango, Chihuahua, Sinaloa, Jalisco, Zacatecas, Nayarit)		Tepehuán Mythology, Shamanism, Animism, Peyotism, Christianity → Catholicism
Tewa	Tanoan → Tewa	United States (New Mexico)		Christianity, Pueblo religion
Timbisha	Uto-Aztecan → Numic → Timbisha		Native American religion	
Tlapanec	Oto-Manguean → Tlapanec	Mexico (Guerrero)		Christianity → Catholicism
Tlicho	Na-Dene → Athabaskan → Tlicho	Canada (Northwest Territories)		Christianity, Animism
Tlingit	Na-Dene → Tlingit	Canada (British Columbia, Yukon Territory), United States (Alaska, Washington)		Alaska Native religion
Tojolabal	Mayan → Q'anjobalan → Tojolab'al	Mexico (Chiapas)		Christianity, Mayan religion
Totonac	Totonac	Mexico (Veracruz, Puebla, Hidalgo)		Christianity, Native American religion
Tsimshian	Tsimshianic → Maritime Tsimshianic	Canada (British Columbia), United States (Alaska)	Kitasoo, Gitga'ata, Kitkatla, Kitsumkalum, Kitselas, Ginadoiks, Ginaxangiik, Gispaxlo'ots, Gitando, Gitlaan, Gits'iis, Gitwilgyoots, Gitzaxłaał, Giluts'aaw	Alaskan Native religion
Tsleil-Waututh	Salishan → Coast Salish → Halkomelem	Canada (British Columbia)		Native American religion
Tsuut'ina	Na-Dene → Athabaskan → Tsuut'ina	Canada (Alberta)		Christianity, Native American religion
Tunica-Biloxi	Indo-European → Germanic → English; Indo-European → Romance → French; Tunica language Historically Siouan → Ohio Valley Siouan → Biloxi	United States (Tunica-Biloxi Indian Reservation)	Biloxi, Tunica	Native American religion, Christianity → Protestantism, Catholicism
Tunumiit	Eskaleut → Inuit → Tunumiisut	Danish Realm (Tunu)		Inuit religion, Christianity
Tuscarora	Iroquoian → Northern Iroquoian → Tuscarora	Canada (Ontario), United States (New York, North Carolina)		Longhouse Religion, Christianity
Tutchones	Na-Dene → Athabaskan → Tutchone	Canada (Yukon Territory)	Northern Tutchones, Southern Tutchones	Native American religion
Tzeltal	Mayan → Cholan → Tzeltal	Mexico (Chiapas)		Christianity, Mayan religion
Tzotzil	Tzotzil	Mayan → Cholan → Tzotzil		Christianity, Mayan religion, Islam
Tz'utujil	Mayan → Quichean → Tz'utujil	Guatemala (Guatemalan Highlands)		Christianity → Catholicism, Maya religion
Umatilla	Plateau Penutian → Sahaptian → Umatilla	United States (Oregon)		Native American religion
Upper Kuskokwim	Na-Dene → Athabaskan → Upper Kuskokwim	United States (Interior Alaska)		Christianity → Eastern Orthodoxy → Russian Orthodoxy
Upper Skagit	Salishan → Coast Salish → Lushootseed	United States (Washington)		Christianity, Native American religion
Ute	Uto-Aztecan → Numic → Colorado River Numic → Ute	United States (Colorado, Utah)		Native American Church, Christianity
Walla Walla	Plateau Penutian → Sahaptin → Walla Walla	United States (Oregon, Washington)		Waashat Religion
Wampanoag	Algic → Algonquian → Wampanoag	United States (Massachusetts)	Mashpee Wampanoag Tribe, Wampanoag Tribe of Gay Head (Aquinnah)	Native American religion, Christianity
Wappo	Yuki-Wappo → Wappo	United States (Alexander Valley)		Christianity, Native American religion
Washoe	Washo	United States (California, Nevada)		Native American religion
Wassamasaw	Indo-European → Germanic → English → American English	United States (Berkeley County, South Carolina)		Christianity → Protestantism → Baptism
Wichita	Caddoan → Wichita	United States (Oklahoma; formerly Kansas, Texas)		Native American Church, Christianity, Native American religion
Wolastoqiyik	Algic → Algonquian → Maliseet-Passamaquoddy	United States (Maine), Canada (New Brunswick, Quebec)		Christianity, Native American religion
Wuikinuxv	Wakashan → Northern Wakashan → Heiltsuk–Oowekyala → Oowekyala	Canada (British Columbia)		Native American religion
Wyandot	Iroquoian → Wyandot	United States, Canada (Great Lakes)		Christianity
Xinca	Xincan	Guatemala		Native American religion, Christianity → Catholicism
Yaqui	Uto-Aztecan → Cahitan → Yaqui	Mexico (Sonora), United States (Arizona)		Peyotism, Christianity → Catholicism
Yellowknives	Na-Dene → Athabaskan → Chipewyan	Canada (Northwest Territories)		Christianity
Yucatec Maya	Mayan → Yucatecan → Yucatec Maya	Mexico (Yucatan, Campeche, Quintana Roo), Belize (Corozal District, Orange Walk District)		Christianity, Mayan religion
Yuchi	Yuchi language	United States (Tennessee, Alabama, Georgia, South Carolina)		Christianity → Protestantism → Methodism; Stomp Dance, Native American Church
Yup'ik	Eskaleut → Eskimo → Yup'ik	United States (Alaska)	Nunivak Cupʼig, Chevak Cupʼik	Christianity, Shamanism
Zapotecs	Oto-Manguean → Zapotecan → Zapotec	Mexico (Oaxaca)	Ixtlan	Christianity → Catholicism
Zonians	Indo-European → Germanic → English → American English	Panama (Panama Canal Zone)		Christianity
Zoque	Mixe–Zoque → Zoque	Mexico (Chiapas, Oaxaca, Veracruz, Tabasco)		Christianity → Catholicism
Zuni	Zuni language	United States (New Mexico)		Christianity

== Lists of ethnic groups ==
By status:

- List of Indigenous peoples
- List of diasporas
- List of stateless nations

Regional lists:

- African people
  - List of contemporary ethnic groups of Africa
  - Indigenous people of Africa
  - Ethnic groups in Algeria
  - Ethnic groups in Botswana
  - Ethnic groups in Burundi
  - Ethnic groups in Chad
  - List of ethno-linguistic groups in Eritrea
  - List of ethnic groups in Ethiopia
  - List of ethnic groups in Nigeria
    - List of ethnic groups in Rivers State
  - Ethnic groups in Rwanda
  - List of ethnic groups in Tanzania
  - Ethnic groups in Senegal
  - Ethnic groups in Sierra Leone
  - List of ethnic groups in South Sudan
  - List of ethnic groups in Zambia
- Asian people
  - List of contemporary ethnic groups of Asia
  - Ethnic groups in Northern Asia
    - List of ethnic groups in Russia
  - List of ethnic groups in East Asia
    - List of ethnic groups in China
    - List of ethnic groups in Japan
    - List of ethnic groups in North Korea
    - List of ethnic groups in South Korea
    - List of ethnic groups in Taiwan
      - List of indigenous peoples of Taiwan
  - South Asian ethnic groups
    - Ethnic groups in Nepal
    - Ethnic groups in Pakistan
      - Demographics of Sindh
  - Ethnic groups in Southeast Asia
    - Ethnic groups in Indonesia
    - List of ethnic groups in Laos
    - Ethnic groups in Malaysia
    - List of ethnic groups in Myanmar
    - Ethnic groups in the Philippines
    - List of ethnic groups in Vietnam
  - Ethnic groups in the Middle East
- European people
  - List of contemporary ethnic groups of Europe
  - Ethnic groups in Bosnia and Herzegovina
  - Peoples of the Caucasus
- Indigenous peoples of the Americas
  - List of contemporary ethnic groups of South America
  - Classification of indigenous peoples of the Americas
- Oceanian people
  - List of contemporary ethnic groups of Oceania
  - List of Indigenous Australian group names
  - List of Melanesian ethnic groups
    - List of New Guinean ethnic groups
  - List of Micronesian ethnic groups
  - List of Polynesian ethnic groups
- Ethnoreligious group
- Ethnic groups by country

== See also ==
- List of languages by number of native speakers
- List of language families
- Lists of people by nationality
- Lists of active separatist movements
- Uncontacted peoples
- Ethnic flag
- Race (human categorization)
- List of Y-chromosome haplogroups in populations of the world
