= Helen Kalvak =

Canadian Inuk graphic artist

- She was decorated with traditional beautifying kakiniq (facial tattoos).
- Born: 1901; Tahiryuak Lake, Victoria Island, Northwest Territories Canada
- Died: 7 May 1984 (aged 82–83); Ulukhaktok
- Known for: Graphic artist
- Notable work: The Dance
- Awards: Royal Canadian Academy of Arts; Order of Canada

Helen Kalvak, CM RCA (Kalvakadlak) (1901 - 7 May 1984) was a Copper Inuk graphic artist from Ulukhaktok (formerly Holman), Northwest Territories, Canada.

== Early years ==
Kalvak was born at Tahiryuaq, also known as Tahiryuak Lake, on Victoria Island and raised in the Prince Albert Sound area. Her family also spent some time at Minto Inlet. She lived a traditional Inuit lifestyle for most of her life. Her mother was Enataomik. Her father Halukhit encouraged her spiritual gifts and taught her to be an angatkuq (the equivalent of a spiritual healer in Inuit culture). Although Kalvak later converted to Christianity, she continued to reflect her traditional Inuit religion in her artwork, along with the stories which she had learned as a child.

== Later years ==
In 1960, Kalvak moved to Holman (present-day Ulukhaktok) after the sudden death of her husband, Edward Manayok. There in 1961 she helped a Roman Catholic priest, Rev. Henri Tardy, set up the Holman Eskimo Co-op. It was at this time that Kalvak began her artwork. In 1965, her artwork was turned into prints and sold throughout the world.

In recognition of her work, Kalvak was inducted into the Royal Canadian Academy of Arts in 1975. This was followed in 1978 by her appointment to the Order of Canada. By 1978, Kalvak had produced an estimated 2,000 drawings. She was no longer able to use her hands due to Parkinson's disease. The following year, Canada Post used her work entitled The Dance for the 17¢ postage stamp. With 176 published prints, Kalvak is the Ulukhaktok artist with the largest body of published work.

At the time of her death in 1984, Kalvak was one of the few remaining Inuit women in Ulukhaktok decorated with traditional beautifying facial kakiniq (tattoos).

In 1984 a competition was held to rename the Ulukhaktok Elihavik School and in 1985 it was renamed Helen Kalvak Elihakvik.

== Personal life ==
Kalvak was married to Edward Manayok, a singer and drum dancer. He died at a coastal outpost camp at Walker Bay.

Their daughter, Elsie Nilgak, states:

"When they were trying to start the Co-op my mother was given drawing paper to make drawings. She would make drawings when we were at our outpost camp at Walker Bay [on the coast north of Minto Inlet]. The drawings would show the way people used to dress and live. She did drawings for some of the sealskin tapestries also. There were about five women, including my mother, who sewed sealskins for the Co-op. I still remember the first drawings and designs by my mother for kamiks, parkas, mitts, and other craft items. There were about five women who made sealskin clothing and mats. I remember coming into Holman in the summer by boat to sell some of my mother’s finished drawings and I would get more art supplies to take back for her. This was after my father passed away [in 1960]."

Her granddaughter, Julia Manoyok Ekpakohak (born 1968), is also an artist. She was taught by Kalvak.
