= Tahiryuaq (Northwest Territories) =

Lake in the Northwest Territories, Canada

- Location in the NWT
- Location: Victoria Island; Northwest Territories
- Coordinates: 70°56′02″N 112°15′07″W
- Primary outflows: Kuuk River
- Catchment area: Prince Albert Sound
- Basin countries: Canada
- Surface elevation: 221 metres (725 ft)
- Settlements: Nearest is Ulukhaktok

Tahiryuaq, formerly Tahiryuak Lake, is a lake located in the Canadian Arctic's Northwest Territories. It is situated in northcentral Victoria Island, north of Prince Albert Sound, southeast of Minto Inlet.

The lake is populated with Arctic char It is designated as a Key Habitat Site because of the high density of nesting king eiders. In addition, notable populations of Arctic tern, cackling goose, long-tailed duck, Pacific loon, pomarine jaeger, and Sabine's gulls frequent the area.

Tahiryuak was a caribou hunting region of the Haneragmiut and the Kanianermiut Copper Inuit.

== See also ==
- List of lakes of the Northwest Territories
