= Kangiryuarmiut =

The Kangiryuarmiut (or Kanhiryuarmiut; or Kanhiryiirmiut) are an Inuvialuit group, culturally and historically related to the Copper Inuit. They were historically located on Victoria Island in the areas of Prince Albert Sound, Cape Baring, and central Victoria island. They often travelled seasonally around their traditional territory including to Banks Island, both south to Nelson Head and as far north as Mercy Bay to collect raw materials from the wreck of HMS Investigator (1848). Archaeologists have also found many sites left by Kangiryuarmiut and their ancestors in what is now Aulavik National Park. Today, many Kangiryuarmiut still live on Victoria Island, in the hamlet of Ulukhaktok, now within the Inuvialuit Settlement Region.

The Kangiryuarmiut speak Kangiryuarmiutun, often considered a sub dialect of Inuvialuktun, although it is more closely related to Inuinnaqtun. Inuvialuktun names for groups often refer to geographic features within a group's traditional territory. Kangiryuarmiut translates to "the people of the large bay", referring to Prince Albert Sound.

The Kangiryuarmiut subsisted on polar bear. They were the only Copper Inuit who built iglooit on land.

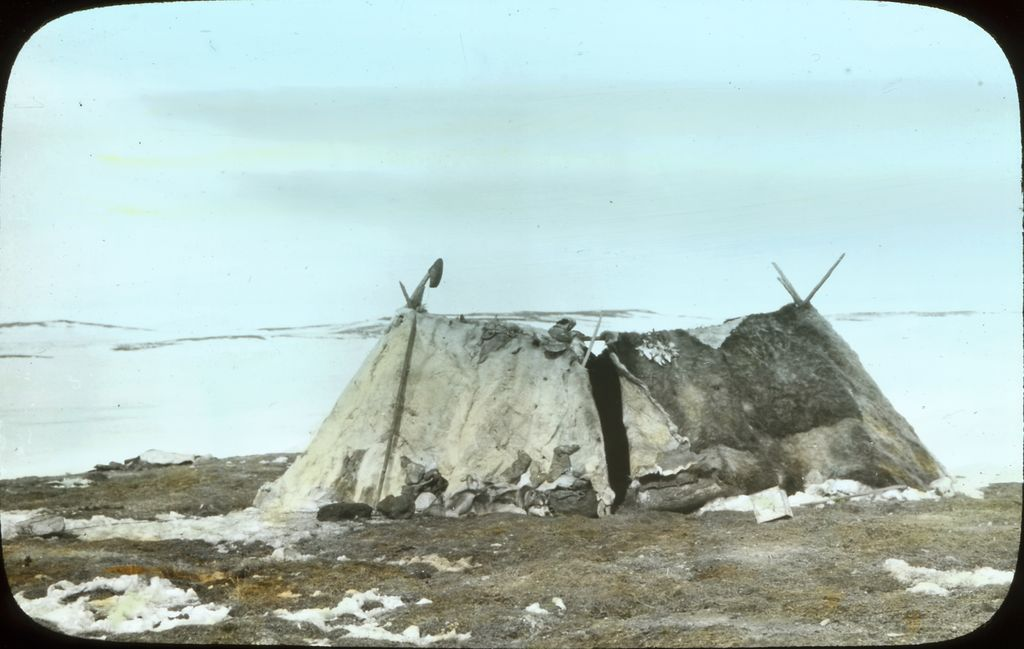
Double tent of Kangiryuarmiut families

The Kangiryuarmiut and the Kangiryuatjagmiut of Minto Inlet were the northernmost Copper Inuit. They migrated seasonally in western Victoria Island, Banks Island, and the mainland around Kugluktuk, Nunavut. Prior to non-Indigenous contact, and the introduction of schooners, they migrated usually by foot, developing what Nuttall referred to as an "embodied memoryscape", meaning that people knew place names along the route, the accompanying stories, and the collective significance with relational understanding of locations. According to Helen Balanoff from the NWT Literacy Council and Cynthia Chambers from the University of Lethbridge, this knowledge is integral to social identity and Inuinnaqtun literacy.
