= Matsqui =

Matsqui may refer to:

- Matsqui people, an Aboriginal group in British Columbia, Canada
  - Matsqui First Nation
- District of Matsqui, a municipality in British Columbia
- Matsqui Island, British Columbia
