= Fort Collinson =

Former trading post in the Northwest Territories, Canada

Fort Collinson Fort Brabant
- Trading post
- Location within Northwest Territories
- Coordinates: 71°37′02″N 117°52′09″W
- Country: Canada
- Territory: Northwest Territories
- Region: Inuvik
- Built: 1928
- Closed: 1939
- Founder: Hudson's Bay Company
- Named for: Richard Collinson

Fort Collinson was a trading post operated by the Hudson's Bay Company (HBC) located on Victoria Island in the Northwest Territories, Canada. It is situated on the Prince Albert Peninsula on the north side of Walker Bay, just north of Minto Inlet.

The first trading post in the area was established in 1923 on the north side of Prince Albert Sound, called Fort Brabant, after Angus Brabant, HBC fur trade commissioner from 1920 to 1927.

In August 1928, the post was relocated to Walker Bay, in order to be closer to the hunting grounds of the post's indigenous hunters. On December 31, 1929, the post was renamed in honour of Sir Richard Collinson, an English naval officer and explorer of the Arctic. It closed in 1939 when it was transferred to Holman (now Ulukhaktok).
