= Kugaryuak River =

Location
- Country: Canada
- Territory: Nunavut

Physical characteristics
- Mouth
  - location: Coronation Gulf

The Kugaryuak River is located in the Canadian Arctic territory of Nunavut in the southwest Kitikmeot Region. It forks into two entities, the Western Kugaryuak (67°46′N 114°25′W) and the Eastern Kugaryuak (67°43′N 113°17′W) and flows into Coronation Gulf.

Arctic charr abound in the Kugaryuak.

== History ==
In 1928, a Hudson's Bay Company trading post was moved to Kugaryuak (Post Number: B.429) from Tree River.

The Kugaryuagmiut were a Copper Inuit subgroup that lived along the shores of the Kugaryuak. In 1990, three archaeological sites of tent rings were found along the Kugaryuak from precontact Inuit period.

== See also ==
- List of rivers of Nunavut
