= Walker Bay (disambiguation) =

Walker Bay may refer to:

- Walker Bay
- Walker Bay, Livingston Island
- Walker Bay (Northwest Territories)
