= Asiagmiut =

Arctic coast Copper Inuit group

Asiagmiut (also Aziagmut) were an Arctic coast Copper Inuit group in Kitikmeot Region, Nunavut, Canada. They were located near Ogden Bay east of the Coppermine River, between the Coppermine River and Tree rivers, west of Kent Peninsula, east of Kent Peninsula, and opposite Melbourne Island. Hudson (1989) mentions the Asiagmiut, a Caribou Inuit group of the Kazan River area, who were subsistence hunters.
