= Kangiryuatjagmiut =

Copper Inuit subgroup

Kangiryuatjagmiut (or Kanghiryatmagmiut; or Kanhiryuatjidgmiut) were a Copper Inuit subgroup. They lived around Minto Inlet, and between Minto inlet and Walker Bay.

The Kangiryuatjagmiut and the Kangiryuarmiut of Prince Albert Sound were the northernmost Copper Inuit. As with the Kangiryuarmiut, the Kangiryuatjagmiut migrated seasonally throughout western Victoria Island, Banks Island, and the mainland in the area of present-day Kugluktuk, Nunavut. Prior to white contact, and the introduction of schooners, the Kangiryuarmiut migrated mostly by foot, developing what Nuttall (1992) referred to as an "embodied memoryscape" in that people knew all place names en route, the accompanying stories, and a collective significance and relational understanding of locations. According to Balanoff and Chambers, this knowledge is integral to social identity and Inuinnaqtun literacies.
