= Copper Inuit =

Inuit in Canada

Total population
- 800

Regions with significant populations
- Northwest Territories; Nunavut

Languages
- Inuvialuktun (sometimes called Western Canadian Inuktitut; also referred to as Inuinnaqtun)

Religion
- Animism; Inuit religion

Inu- ᐃᓄ- / nuna ᓄᓇ "person" / "land"
- Person: Inuinnaq
- People: Inuinnait
- Language: Inuinnaqtun; Tikuraq ᑎᑯᕋᖅ
- Country: Inuinnait Nunangat, Inuit Nunangat ᐃᓄᐃᑦ ᓄᓇᖓᑦ

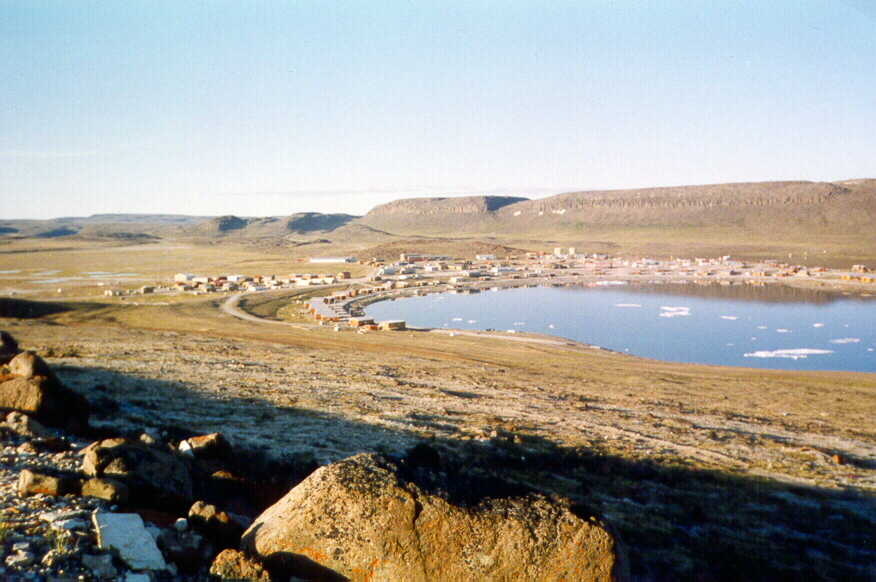
Looking at Ulukhaktok, Canada, from the bluffs that give the community its name, 1980s

Copper Inuit, also known as Inuinnait and Kitlinermiut, are a Canadian Inuit group who live north of the tree line, in what is now the Kitikmeot Region of Nunavut and in the Inuvialuit Settlement Region in the Inuvik Region of the Northwest Territories. Most of them historically lived in the area around Coronation Gulf, on Victoria Island, and southern Banks Island.

Their western boundary was Wise Point, near Dolphin and Union Strait. Their northwest territory was the southeast coast of Banks Island. Their southern boundary was the eastern shore of Great Bear Lake, Contwoyto Lake and Lake Beechey on the Back River. To the east, the Copper Inuit and the Netsilingmiut were separated by Perry River in Queen Maud Gulf. While Copper Inuit travelled throughout Victoria Island, to the west, they concentrated south of Walker Bay, while to the east, they were concentrated south of Denmark Bay.

As the people have no collective name for themselves, they have adopted the English term "Copper Inuit". It represents those westernmost Central Inuit who used and relied on native copper gathered along the lower Coppermine River and the Coronation Gulf.

According to Knud Rasmussen (1932), other Inuit referred to Copper Inuit as Kitlinermiut, as Kitlineq was an Inuit language name for Victoria Island.

== History ==
=== Early millennia ===
Copper Inuit, like all Inuit, are descendants of the Thule people. Changes in the environment may have resulted in the transition from prehistoric Thule culture to Copper Inuit culture.

For about 3,000 years the Copper Inuit were nomads who practiced a hunter-gatherer lifestyle. Their settlement and acculturation to some European-Canadian ways has occurred only since the 1940s, and they have also continued the hunting and gathering lifestyle.

They lived in communal iglu (snowhouses) during the winter and engaged in breathing-hole (mauliqtoq) seal hunting. In the summer, they spread out in smaller, family groups for inland caribou hunting and fishing.

The people made copper arrows, spear heads, ulu blades, chisels, harpoons, and knives for both personal use and for trade amongst other Inuit. In addition to the copper products, Copper Inuit soapstone products were highly regarded in the Bering Strait trade network. Other trade partners included Inuvialuit from the Avvaq Peninsula and Kivallirmiut (Caribou Inuit) to the south. Many Copper Inuit gathered in the Cambridge Bay area in the summertime because of plentiful game.

=== Post-Euro-Canadian contact ===
According to Robin McGrath, there are Inuit stories that show there was a history of conflict between the Inuit and the Dene, as well as others which may have involved Europeans. This conflict seems to have been instigated by both Dene and Inuit and possibly was caused by trade disputes but sometimes due to raids for women. One of the better known of these battles was recorded by European explorer Samuel Hearne. In 1771, Samuel Hearne was the first European to explore the Coppermine River region. It was here that Matonabbee, leader of Hearne's Chipewyan Dene guides, and his companions massacred a Copper Inuit group at Bloody Falls. Further exploration did not take place until the period of 1820–1853, which included the Sir John Franklin expeditions of 1821 and 1825. John Rae encountered Copper Inuit at Rae River in 1847, and at Cape Flinders and Stromness Bay in 1851. During the McClure Arctic expedition, Irish explorer, Robert McClure abandoned his ship, HMS Investigator, at Mercy Bay on Banks Island in 1853 during his search for Franklin's lost expedition. It provided extensive amounts of wood, copper, and iron which the Copper Inuit used for years. Richard Collinson explored the area in 1850–1855.

==== 20th century ====
In the belief that the Copper Inuit had migrated to Hudson Bay for trading at various outposts, the Canadian government's 1906 map marked Victoria Island as "uninhabited". It was not until the early years of the 20th century that trading ships returned to Copper Inuit territory. They followed Vilhjalmur Stefansson's encounter with, and report on, so-called Blond Eskimos among the Copper Inuit from his Arctic exploration of 1908–1912. During the Canadian Arctic Expedition, 1913–1916, Canadian ethnographer Diamond Jenness spent two years living with and documenting the lives of Copper Inuit. He sent thousands of artifacts of their material culture to the Geological Survey of Canada.

Along with trade, European contact brought influenza and typhoid. These newly introduced infectious diseases likely weakened resistance of the natives. Between 1929 and 1931, one in five Copper Inuit died from a tuberculosis epidemic. Around the same time, the whaling industry deteriorated. Alaskan Iñupiat and Mackenzie Delta Inuvialuit came into the Coronation Gulf area to co-exist with the Copper Inuit. The first Holman-area (Ulukhaktok) trading post was established in 1923 at Alaervik, on the north shore of Prince Albert Sound, but it closed five years later. The post relocated to Fort Collinson on Walker Bay, north of Minto Inlet. Two other stores opened in Walker Bay but closed by 1939, in the years of the Great Depression.

=== Settlement ===
In 1960, the federal government shipped three housing units to Holman, and another four in 1961. In the years to follow, some families moved to Holman permanently, while others lived there seasonally. Some Copper Inuit moved to the communities of Coppermine (Kugluktuk) or Cambridge Bay. Still others gravitated to outposts along Bathurst Inlet, Contwoyto Lake, Coronation Gulf, and on Victoria Island.

The Copper Inuit have gradually adopted snowmobiles, satellite dish television service, and Christian churches. Many young people now speak English rather than Inuinnaqtun. Together, these introductions have created social change among the Copper Inuit.

== Culture ==
=== Language ===
Copper Inuit traditionally speak Inuinnaqtun and Inuvialuktun, sometimes referred to as Western Canadian Inuktitut.

=== Habitat and diet ===
Historically, Copper Inuit lived among tundra, rocky hills, outcrops, with some forested areas towards the southern and southwestern range. Here they hunted Arctic ground squirrel, Arctic hare, caribou (barren ground and Peary's herds), grizzly bear, mink, moose, muskox, muskrat, polar bear, wolf, and wolverine. They fished in the extensive network of ponds, lakes, and rivers, including the Coppermine, Rae, and Richardson Rivers, which sustained large populations of freshwater Arctic char (also found in the ocean), grayling, lake trout, and whitefish. The marine waters supported codfish, bearded seal, and ringed seal. Ducks, geese, guillemots, gulls, hawks, longspurs, loons, plovers, ptarmigans, and snow buntings were also part of the Copper Inuit diet. They liked raw but not boiled eggs. They used and cooked food and products from the sea, but kept them separate from those of the land.

=== Clothing ===
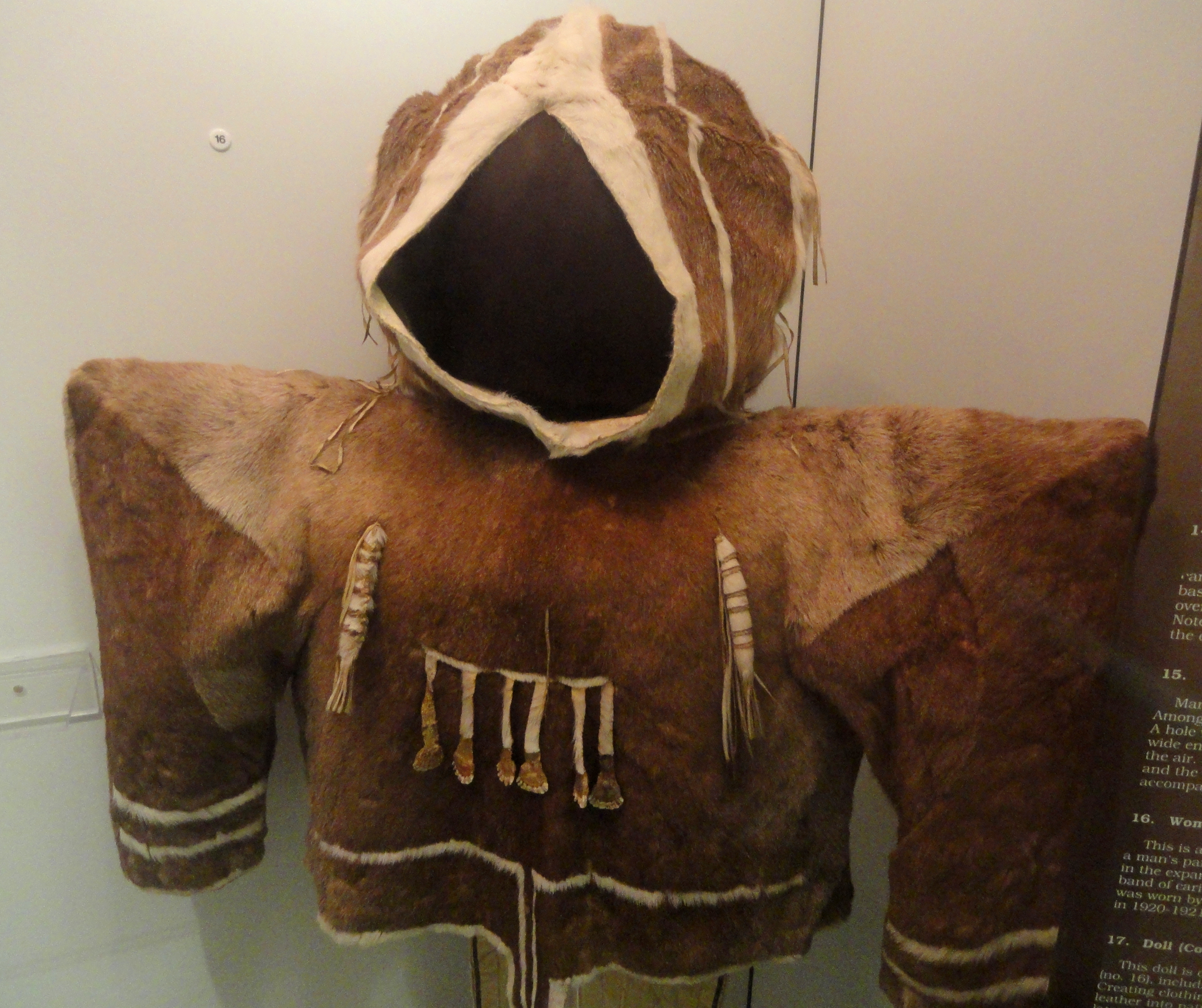
Copper Inuit woman's parka, collected in 1920–1921, Peabody Museum, Harvard

Copper Inuit clothing consisted of short-waisted inner parkas accented with long, narrow back tails, and sleeves that came short of the wrist. In severe weather, they added a heavy outer parka. Women's parkas were distinguished by elongated hoods, and exaggerated, pointed shoulders. Boots extended up the leg to button at the waistline. They made the soles from feathers or bird skins. Copper Inuit used different napkins for different meals: ptarmigan skins when eating caribou, and gull skins when eating seal.

Contemporary clothing and boots may be made of a variety of skins, including:

- Dance cap: caribou, ermine, and the bill of a yellow-billed loon
- Parkas: Arctic hare, otter, rabbit, wild mink
- Mitts: beaver, polar bear, caribou skunk
- Boots: caribou, dog, polar bear, seal, wolf, wolverine
- Kamiit: caribou, moose
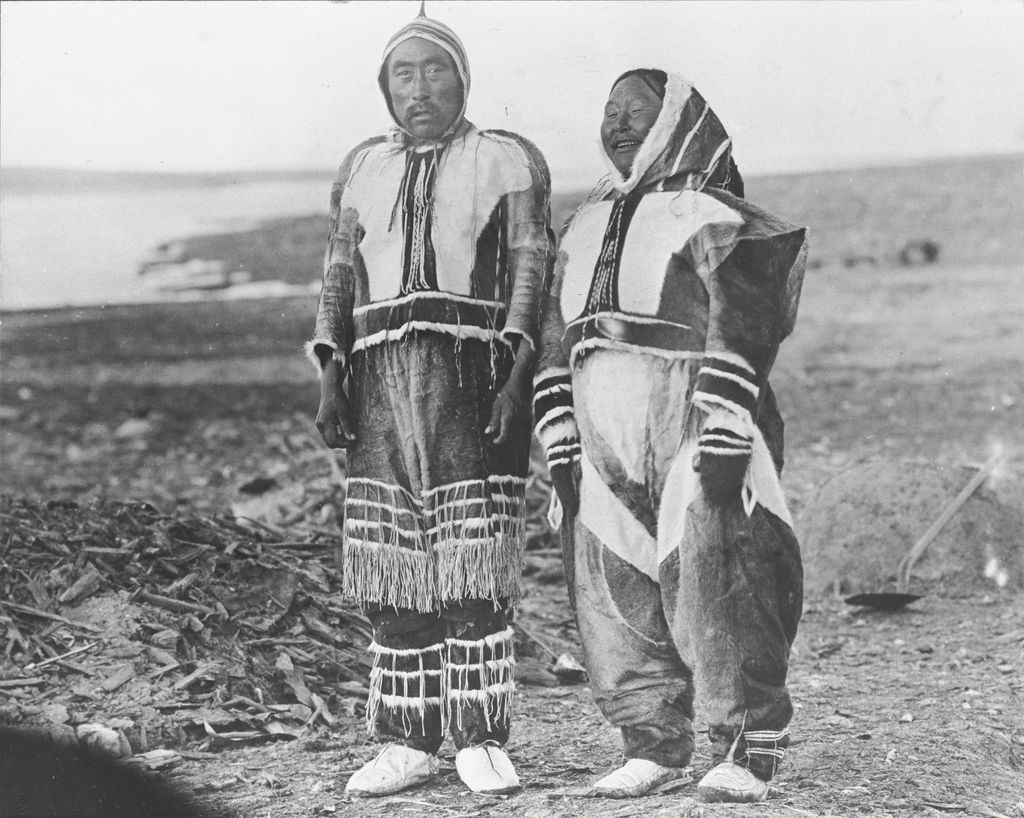

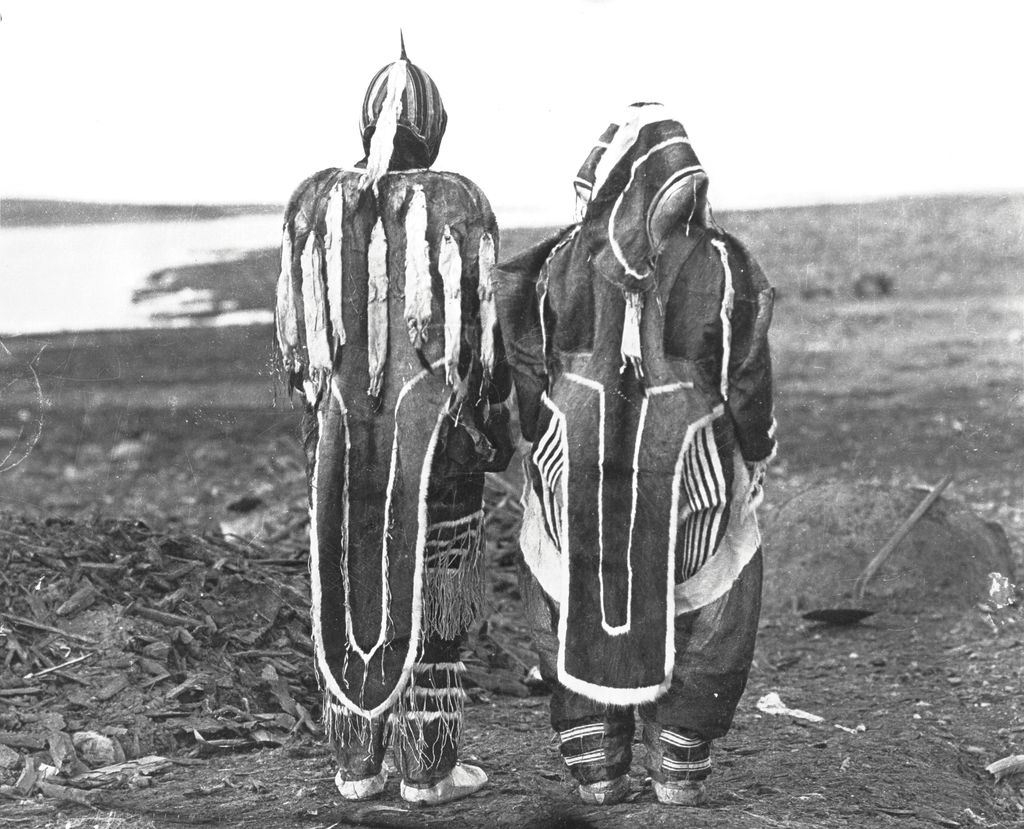
Copper Inuit angakkuit (shamans) Ikpukhuak and Higalik in ceremonial clothing, c. 1913–1916

In addition to their everyday clothing, historically, many Inuit had a set of ceremonial clothing made of short-haired summer skins, worn for dancing or other ceremonial occasions. In particular, the dance clothing of the Copper Inuit has been extensively studied and preserved in museums worldwide. The design of these garments was inextricably linked with the religious practices of the Copper Inuit, containing what anthropologist Bernadette Driscoll-Engelstad describes as "design references alluding to the integration of the human and animal realm, the natural and the supernatural." By the 1930s, the ceremonial clothing of the Copper Inuit had died out, although it was intentionally revived in the 1990s.

=== Religion ===
Copper Inuit had an animistic spiritual system, which included belief that animal spirits could be offended through taboo violations. They believed that dwarfs, giants, "caribou people", and the sea-goddess Arnapkapfaaluk or "big bad woman" inhabit the world. Their conception of the tupilaq is similar to the Christian concept of the devil.

The angakkuit (shamans) could be male or female. They warded off evil spirits, functioned as intermediaries between people and the spirit world, healed illness or taboo violations, and controlled weather.

== Subgroups ==
Copper Inuit lived within geographically defined subgroups well documented by Stefansson, Franz Boas, and others:

- Ahiagmiut: Ogden Bay
- Akuliakattagmiut: Cape Bexley
- Asiagmiut: Ogden Bay
- Ekalluktogmiut: Ekalluk River, Albert Edward Bay; central Victoria Island
- Haneragmiut: Dolphin and Union Strait
- Haningayogmiut: Back River
- Kaernermiut: Back River
- Kangiryuarmiut: Prince Albert Sound, Cape Baring, central Victoria island; Nelson Head on Banks Island
- Kangiryuatjagmiut: Minto Inlet; between Minto inlet and Walker Bay
- Kilusiktogmiut: Victoria Island; Coronation Gulf area at the mouth of the Mackenzie River
- Kogluktogmiut: Bloody Falls on the Coppermine River, Dease River, and Great Bear Lake (McTavish Bay); Coronation Gulf, southeast of Cape Krusenstern
- Kogluktualugmiut (or Utkusiksaligmiut – "the dwellers of the place where there is pot stone"): Tree River ("Kogluktualuk"), 130 km (80 mi) east of the Coppermine River
- Kogluktuaryumiut: from the mouth of the Kogluktuaryuk River which flows into Grays Bay on up river; Grays Bay and the Coronation Gulf ice off of it
- Kugaryuagmiut: Kugaryuak River
- Nagyuktogmiut (or Killinermiut): Nagyuktok Island, one of the Duke of York Islands; central Coronation Gulf; Victoria Island northeast of Lady Franklin Point; mainland east of Tree River; Dismal Lakes near the head of Dease River; ("Deer Horn Esquimaux")
- Noahonirmiut (or Noahdnirmiut): Liston and Sutton Islands in the Dolphin and Union Strait to the mainland: north of Rae River, south of Lambert Island
- Pallirmiut: mouth of the Rae River (Pallirk) and head of Dease River; Coronation Gulf, southeast of Cape Krusenstern
- Pingangnaktogmiut: Pingangnaktok ("it blows a land wind"), inland west of Tree River
- Puiplirmiut (or Puiblirmiut): Dolphin and Union Strait near Liston and Sutton Islands; also north and northeast of Simpson Bay on Victoria Island
- Ugyuligmiut: north of Minto Inlet
- Ulukhaktokmiut: Ulukhaktok (formerly known as Holman), after the copper used in ulu making that was found there
- Umingmuktogmiut: permanent village of Umingmaktok (Umingmuktog) on the western coast of Kiillinnguyaq; Bathurst Inlet

== Notable Copper Inuit ==
- Joe Allen Evyagotailak
- Donald Havioyak
- Helen Kalvak
- Helen Maksagak
- Kane Tologanak
- Uloqsaq (historical)
