= Ugyuligmiut =

Copper Inuit subgroup on Victoria Island

The Ugyuligmiut were a geographically defined Copper Inuit subgroup in the Canadian Arctic. They were located in the Northwest Territories, on Victoria Island north of Minto Inlet, and on Banks Island in the Aulavik National Park region.

The Ugyuligmiut of Minto Inlet were noted during the Arctic voyages of both Sir Richard Collinson and Sir Robert McClure in the mid 19th century. However, at the time of Vilhjalmur Stefansson's explorations in 1914, the Victoria Island Inuit told him of the Ugyuligmiut, a "numerous population", but that they were now extinct, either from famine or from being shot.
