= Wollaston Peninsula =

Peninsula in the Northwest Territories and Nunavut, Canada

Location in Nunavut and Northwest Territories

The Wollaston Peninsula (previously, Wollaston Land) is a west-pointing peninsula located on southwestern Victoria Island, Canada. It is bordered by Prince Albert Sound to the north, Amundsen Gulf to the west and Dolphin and Union Strait to the south. Most of the peninsula lies in Nunavut's Kitikmeot Region but a smaller portion lies within the Northwest Territories's Inuvik Region. The peninsula is 225 km (140 mi) long, and between 97 and 113 km (60 and 70 mi) wide. Its westernmost point is Cape Baring. In 1826, its south coast was seen by John Richardson and his surveyor Edward Nicholas Kendall, and was named Wollaston Land, in honour of the English chemist William Hyde Wollaston, who discovered the elements palladium and rhodium. In 1851, John Rae went along most of its coast and proved that "Wollaston Land" was connected to that was called "Victoria Land" to the east.
