= Cape Baring =

Peninsula in the Northwest Territories, Canada

Coordinates: 70°1′N 117°28′W

Cape Baring is a Canadian Arctic headland in the Northwest Territories. The most westerly point of the Wollaston Peninsula, it is located on Victoria Island, protruding into the Amundsen Gulf.

The cape is the ancestral home of Kangiryuarmiut, a Copper Inuit subgroup.

It is named in honor of Francis Baring, 1st Baron Northbrook, First Lord of the Admiralty. ⋅
