= Nelson Head =

Coordinates: 71°4′N 122°46′W

Nelson Head is a Canadian Arctic hypsographic cape in the Northwest Territories. The most southerly point of Banks Island, it protrudes into the Amundsen Gulf.

It is the ancestral home of Kangiryuarmiut, a Copper Inuit subgroup.

== Naming ==
The cape was named Nelson's Head by Captain Robert McClure on September 7, 1850 during his western search for Franklin's lost expedition in honor of Lord Nelson, whose profile may have been suggested by the 'strikingly grand and imposing' features of the cape. Nelson had not been previously honored by Arctic explorers.

== Appearance ==
Described by Alexander Armstrong, ship's surgeon aboard HMS Investigator, the cape reaches over 1000 feet almost vertically from the water's edge:

'It is of limestone formation, the lower third of dark brown stratification, above which is assumed a lighter colour of reddish yellow, such as a ferruginous coating might impart. This was surmounted by a dark grey columnar formation, much resembling irregularly formed basaltic columns, with joints or fissures similar to what is usually observed in that formation; the whole capped by a covering of soil.
