= Jago Bay =

Bay in the Northwest Territories, Canada

- Location within Northwest Territories
- Location: Amundsen Gulf
- Coordinates: 71°40′02″N 117°50′09″W
- Ocean/sea sources: Arctic Ocean
- Basin countries: Canada
- Settlements: Uninhabited

Jago Bay is a Canadian Arctic waterway in the Northwest Territories. It is an eastern arm of Amundsen Gulf, north of Walker Bay, and its mouth is west of Fort Collinson.
