= Walker Bay (Northwest Territories) =

Bay in the Northwest Territories, Canada

- Location within Northwest Territories
- Location: Amundsen Gulf
- Coordinates: 71°35′02″N 118°10′09″W
- Ocean/sea sources: Arctic Ocean
- Basin countries: Canada
- Settlements: Uninhabited

Walker Bay is a Canadian Arctic waterway in the Northwest Territories. It is an eastern arm of Amundsen Gulf. The bay is located on western Victoria Island, between Jago Bay, in the north, and Minto Inlet, in the south. It is at the south entrance of Prince of Wales Strait. Fort Collinson is on the bay's northern shore.

Henry Larsen wintered here in 1940. The area is the ancestral home of Copper Inuit.
