= Chester Bay =

Bay in Nunavut, Canada

- Location within Nunavut
- Location: Queen Maud Gulf
- Coordinates: 67°45′N 102°15′W
- River sources: Perry River
- Ocean/sea sources: Arctic Ocean
- Basin countries: Canada
- Settlements: Uninhabited

Chester Bay is an Arctic waterway in Kitikmeot Region, Nunavut, Canada. It is located on the south side of the Queen Maud Gulf off Nunavut's mainland. The Perry River empties into the bay.

Ogden Bay and Gernon Bay are nearby.
