= Kaernermiut =

Copper Inuit subgroup

Kaernermiut (or Kainermiut) were a Copper Inuit subgroup. They were located on the Back River, and, they frequented the Thelon River. The Kaernermiut remained inland through all the seasons, coming to the sea only as single families visiting other tribes. For this reason, they did not kill seals, living instead on caribou and muskoxen. Their land was east and south of the Ahiagmiut. Because the Haningayogmiut were in the same general area, they may have been the same people, with a different name.
