= Perry River (Nunavut) =

River in Nunavut, Canada

- Native name: Kuukyuak (Inuinnaqtun)

Location
- Country: Canada
- Territory: Nunavut
- Region: Kitikmeot

Physical characteristics
- Mouth
  - location: Chester Bay, Queen Maud Gulf
  - coordinates: 67°43′N 102°14′W

Perry River (Kuugjuaq) is a waterway in the Kitikmeot Region, Nunavut, Canada. It empties into Chester Bay on the southern Queen Maud Gulf.

At one time, Stephen Angulalik, and later Red Pedersen, ran a Hudson's Bay Company outpost called Perry River (67°48′N 102°17′W) on a small island at the mouth of the river.

== See also ==
- List of rivers of Nunavut
