= Haningayogmiut =

The Haningayogmiut were a Copper Inuit subgroup located on the Back River (Haningayok). According to Arctic explorer Vilhjalmur Stefansson, the Haningayogmiut were a small tribe. The Kaernermiut were also located on the Back River and may have been the same subgroup.
