= Pingangnaktogmiut =

The Pingangnaktok ("it blows a land wind") are a geographically defined Copper Inuit band in the northern Canadian territory of Nunavut, on the mainland, in Kitikmeot Region. According to Arctic explorer Vilhjalmur Stefansson's 1908-1912 ethnographic journals, they numbered about 30 at the time. In the summer, they hunted to the west of Tree River, which flows into the Coronation Gulf, where they hunted during the winter, the same as other Copper Inuit of that region.
