= Kilusiktogmiut =

Copper Inuit subgroup

Kilusiktogmiut Inuit with a traditional tent and clothes of animals skins, Banks Peninsula, Bathurst Inlet, Nunavut

The Kilusiktogmiut were a Copper Inuit subgroup. They lived on Victoria Island, east of the Nagyuktogmiut who were known to inhabit the area northeast of Lady Franklin Point. They also lived on the mainland along the Coronation Gulf, particularly at the mouth of the Mackenzie River. They spent at least some time on the Banks Peninsula by Bathurst Inlet.
