= Cree religion =

Traditional Native American religion

Cree religion is the traditional Native American religion of the Cree people. Found primarily in Sub-Arctic regions of northern North America, it is practiced within Cree communities in Canada. The tradition has no formal leadership or organizational structure and displays much internal variation.

== Definition and classification ==
A map displaying the main areas of Cree habitation, divided among different dialect groups

The Cree traditionally had no cultural separation of the religious and the secular. Native American religions more broadly have always adapted in response to environmental changes and interactions with other communities. The Cree share many cultural elements with the neighboring Ojibwe people.

== Beliefs ==
Among the Cree, and the northern Ojibwe, the thunderbirds are sometimes called pinesiwak.

The anthropologist Colin Scott characterised the Cree worldview as being animistic. He noted that the Cree traditionally conceive "the world as a community of living entities and relationships".

Success in a hunt is deemed to require the prey animal's cooperation, with the latter thus regarded as a gift. The Cree traditionally believe that prey should be killed respectfully, without waste, and with consideration for the well-being of that species' broader population.

== Practices ==
=== Sun dance ===
Some Ojibwe living near the Plains region also engaged in the sun dance, a practice likely adopted from the Cree.

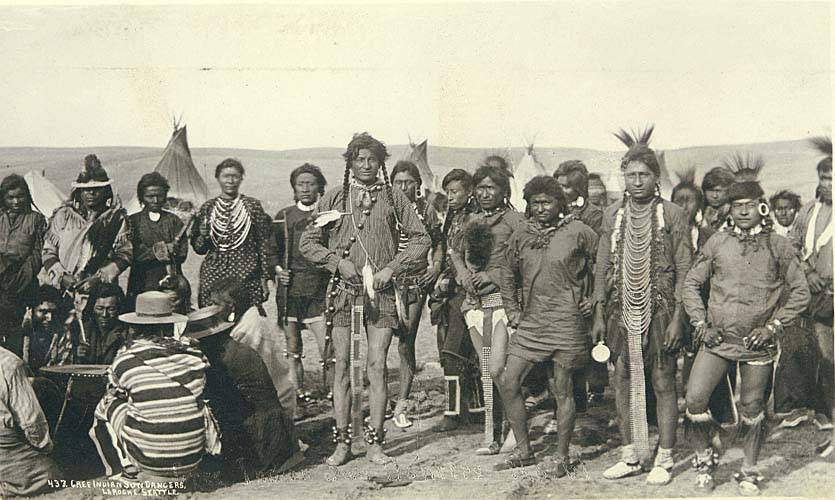
A group of Cree Sun Dancers, photographed c. 1893 by Frank La Roche
