= Ogden Bay =

Bay in Nunavut, Canada

- Location within Nunavut
- Location: Queen Maud Gulf
- Coordinates: 67°44′N 101°30′W
- Basin countries: Canada
- Settlements: Uninhabited

Ogden Bay is an Arctic waterway in the Kitikmeot Region, Nunavut, Canada. It is located in the southern Queen Maud Gulf off Nunavut's mainland. Chester Bay is situated 32 km (20 mi) to the west, Armark is to the east, and the Keith Islands are to the north.

Ogden Bay is the historical home of Ahiagmiut, a Copper Inuit subgroup.
