= Afro-Romani =

People with Romani and African descent

The Afro-Romani are people who are descended from both the Romani people and the African diaspora. Notable Afro-Romani communities exist in Louisiana, United States and Cuba. There are also Romani and Dom communities throughout Africa.

== Afro-Romani communities ==
=== Cuba ===
An Afro-Romani population exists in central Cuba. The Afro-Romani community in Cuba emerged due to the intermarriage of enslaved and formerly enslaved Black and Romani people.

=== Jamaica ===
Enslaved British Romani people were sometimes sent to Jamaica during colonial rule. Some free Black Jamaicans owned Romani slaves. John Atkins, a British slave owner and merchant, wrote in 1722 that the "Creoles" he visited in Jamaica spoke in "a kind of Gypsy gibberish that runs smoothest in swearing."

=== United States ===
Some of the earliest Romani people to arrive in the United States were brought to Louisiana in the 1500s. An Afro-Romani community exists in St. Martin Parish, Louisiana. Afro-Romani people in Louisiana are descended from both Black and Romani enslaved people. Between 1762 and 1800, the Spanish sent Romani slaves from Spain to the Louisiana colony in New Spain. The Afro-Romani community of St. Martin Parish formed through the intermarriage of formerly enslaved free Black and Romani people.

== See also ==
- Black Indians in the United States
