= Kugaryuagmiut =

Copper Inuit subgroup

The Kugaryuagmiut are a geographically defined Copper Inuit band in the northern Canadian territory of Nunavut, on the mainland, in Kitikmeot Region. According to Arctic explorer Vilhjalmur Stefansson's 1908-1912 ethnographic journals, they numbered about 25 at the time. In the summer, they hunted in the region of the Kugaryuak River, which flows into the Coronation Gulf, where they subsisted during the winter, the same as other Copper Inuit of that region.
