= Ahiagmiut =

Subgroup of Copper Inuit

Ahiagmiut were a geographically defined Copper Inuit subgroup in the northern Canadian territory of Nunavut. They were located near Ogden Bay, on the Queen Maud Gulf, and inland towards Back River, then on towards the Akilinik River.

According to Arctic explorer Vilhjalmur Stefansson, Ahiagmiut abandoned their sleds in the summer and proceeded to the Back River with back packs and pack dogs.

Their hunting area was south of another subgroup, the Ekalluktogmiut, on the mainland.
