= Tree River =

River in Nunavut, Canada

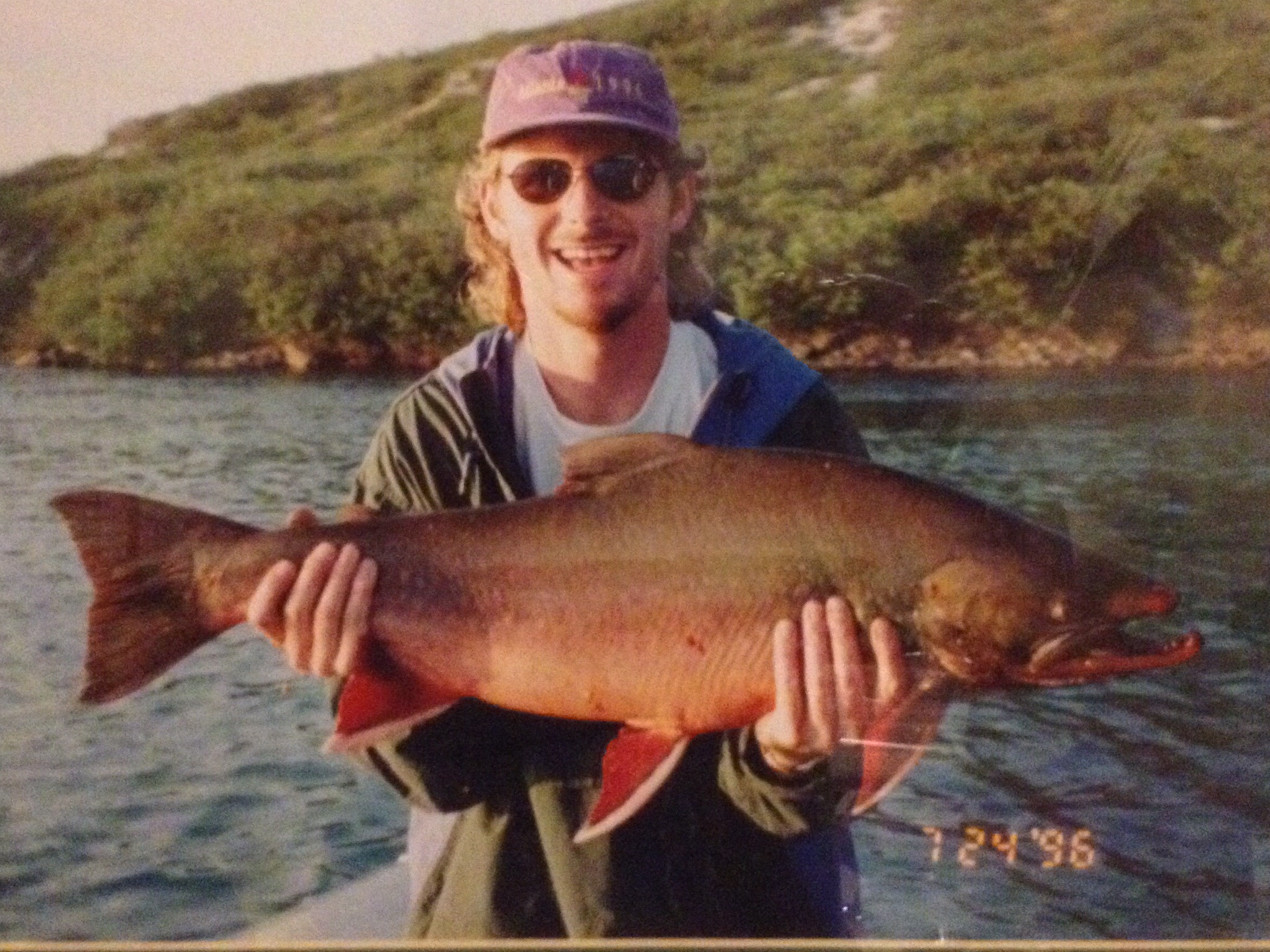
- Arctic Char caught on Tree River, July 1996

Location
- Country: Canada
- Territory: Nunavut
- Region: Kitikmeot

Physical characteristics
- Source
  - location: Inulik Lake
  - coordinates: 66°36′N 113°18′W
  - elevation: 500 m (1,600 ft)
- Mouth
  - location: Coronation Gulf
  - coordinates: 67°41′N 111°53′W
  - elevation: Sea level

The Tree River (Kogluktualuk) is a river in Nunavut, Canada. It flows into Coronation Gulf, an arm of the Arctic Ocean.

Glacial landforms, such as a kame delta, are represented in the area of the Tree River.

This area was the ancestral home of several Copper Inuit bands, including the Kogluktualugmiut (also known as Utkusiksaligmiut), who lived along its shores; the Pingangnaktogmiut, who lived west of the river; and the Nagyuktogmiut (also known as Killinermiut), who lived east of Tree River.

== See also ==
- List of rivers of the Northwest Territories
- List of rivers of Nunavut
