= Matsqui people =

Aboriginal group in British Columbia, Canada

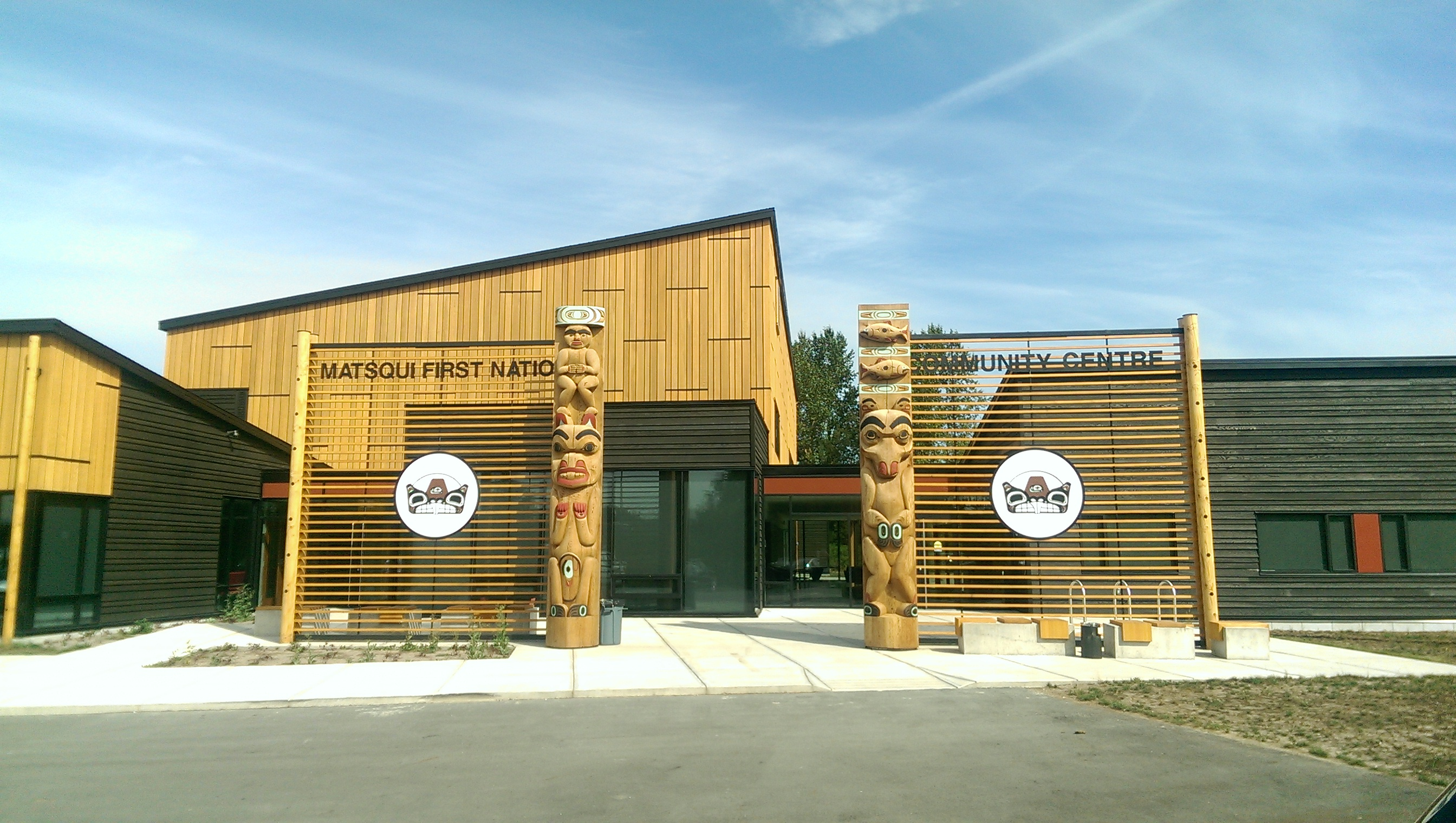
Matsqui's new Administration Building, Health Building, and Gymnasium (opened summer 2015).

The Matsqui people (Halkomelem: Máthxwi) are a Sto:lo Aboriginal group located in the Central Fraser Valley region of British Columbia, Canada. Their band government is the Matsqui First Nation, a member of the Sto:lo Nation tribal council. The core traditional territory of the Matsqui stretches along the Fraser River from Crescent Island to Sumas Mountain, and southward beyond the Canada-United States border. Today the band administers four reserves and has a population of 225 (which has been steadily growing over recent decades). Their original language is Halq'eméylem.

== Transformer stories ==
Ancient legendary stories (known as sxwõxwiyám in the Halq'eméylem language) reveal the ancestors of the current Matsqui people to have occupied Matsqui territory from time immemorial. Like other Sto:lo communities, the Matsqui collectively inherited traits (or "gifts") from their shared legendary ancestors. Sto:lo sxwõxwiyám describe how the Matsqui tribe was founded by a man named Sk-Elê'yitl who, along with his son, was transformed into Beaver by Xá:ls the legendary transformer. Beaver was responsible for ensuring that the sockeye salmon were available to all of the Sto:lo communities on the Fraser River, and was the first to bring fire to the Sto:lo people.

Another sxwõxwiyám explains the origins of a large transformer stone on the eastern edge of Aldergrove Regional Park. Known to the Matsqui as "Méqel" (Halq'eméylem for "nose"), the stone was created by Xá:ls after witnessing a man who started sneezing when enemies were drawing near. Xá:ls was so impressed with this talent that he permanently transformed the man into the stone nose.

== History ==
The Matsqui are closely related to the Nooksack people in Washington, and are notable as one of only two Sto:lo groups that were historically bilingual in the Halq'eméylem and Noocksack languages. Their bilingualism has much to do with the nature of Matsqui territory, which features a system of trails, streams, and lakes that connect the Fraser River to the Nooksack River in Washington. The word "Matsqui" (Máthxwi or Mathexwi) itself may be derived from máth, a root plant that grew in the large, easily traveled marshes that were once abundant in the Matsqui Prairie area. The word "Matsqui" means "easy portage."

== Settlements ==
When the smallpox epidemic spread through Matsqui territory in 1782, its survivors likely consolidated their numbers in the settlements that were the most rich with resources and more easily defended against the coastal raiders. In 1808, the explorer Simon Fraser traveled down the Fraser River and recorded a village that may have been located at Matsqui. Estimating the population to be about 200 people, Fraser also took note of a massive longhouse, "640 feet long by 60 broad [...] under one roof." Near the end of the nineteenth century, anthropologist Franz Boas recorded the name of a village on Matsqui Main Indian Reserve 2, "Ma'mak'ume [Mómeqwem]," and noted that this was one of two Matsqui villages.

== Reserves ==
In 1860, surveyor William McColl established a reserve for the Matsqui at Mómeqwem. Amounting to 9600 acres, the Matsqui reserve was the largest reserve ever to be established in south coastal British Columbia. Within a decade, however, shifts in colonial policy worked to drastically reduce the size of reserves across the colony. In 1867, the Matsqui reserve was reduced to 80 acres, just 8% of the original allotment.

In 1877, an American named Ellis Luther Derby began illegally constructing a dyke at the Matsqui Main reserve, where the majority of Matsqui people lived. Because the Matsqui relied on seasonal flooding to access important hunting and gathering sites, the imposition of the dyke on the reserve significantly disrupted their ability to access key parts of their traditional territory. Nonetheless, in 1879 the Joint Indian Reserve Commission conceded that Derby would be allowed to "keep the Dyke which goes through the Reserve fenced."

Towards the end of the nineteenth century, the nearby construction of the Canadian Pacific Railway (1885) and a spur line to Washington (1892) had opened new agricultural markets to the east and to the south. Around this period, the Matsqui—whose historic economy was by now severely disrupted—adopted agricultural and horticultural activities on their reserve—keeping cattle, sowing crops, and planting orchards—alongside historic practices like fishing. The remnants of the orchards—apple, plum, cherry, and pear trees—are still visible at Matsqui Main Reserve today.

By the early twentieth century, the government had expropriated significant portions of Matsqui Main Reserve for the BC Electric Railway (1910), Canadian National Railway (1915), and Glenmore Road. When the McKenna-McBride Royal Commission came to Matsqui in 1915, they recorded a population of forty people living in eleven homes. The following year, the Indian Agent responsible for Matsqui reported that the population—now thirty six—was rapidly decreasing due to tuberculosis. The commission also received a testimony from Chief Charlie Matsqui. Chief Matsqui protested that the borders of his reserve had been significantly curtailed since 1860, and impinged upon by the BC Electric and CNR railways, without due compensation. The Chief's testimony reveals how the Matsqui may have understood these impositions and merits quoting at length:

Our forefathers have been stopping here and that is the reason we have been living here from time immemorial. I used to hear my grandfather talking about how long he had been here in this province, that is the reason I think that I am the right owner of this Reserve. I did not come here from another country or from other nations - I was always here and always will be. […] For we are the real owners of the land from time immemorial as God create [sic] us Indians in this territory, so as God created the white people and other nations in their own territories in Europe; therefore we claim a permanent compensation for the enormous body of land known as the Province of British Columbia.

— Chief Charlie Matsqui, McKenna-McBride Commission

== Work and education ==
The arrival of miners and then thousands of settlers into Matsqui territory had devastating impacts on the Matsqui community. Most of their natural resources (forests, fish, wildlife, and lands) were being used and regulated by newcomers, their children were being taken to residential schools, and adult men and women were relegated to finding wage employment in only a few industries. But over the past century there has been remarkable improvements in Matsqui people's education attainment, success in lowering unemployment and finding ever more meaningful jobs, and now there are initiatives showing the success of Matsqui people in the field of business and self-governance.

Throughout the twentieth century, Matsqui have engaged in various kinds of employment on and off reserve. The income gained from such activities helped to supplement traditional practices like harvesting, hunting, and fishing, and more recent ones, such as raising cattle or growing potatoes. At the beginning of the century, the Matsqui often found work in fish canning facilities or hop yards. Later, Matsqui logged and planted trees, and harvested cascara bark on Three Islands reserve. They also found work picking berries in the Fraser Valley and on Bainbridge Island, Washington.

Many Matsqui children attended St. Mary's Indian Residential School in Mission, where they sometimes encountered abuse and mistreatment. One of the apparent consequences of the school among the Matsqui was the steep decline in Halq’eméylem speakers between 1863 and 1965, the years the school was open. Today, most Matsqui youth attend public school in the Abbotsford School District. The Abbotsford School District currently delivers cultural awareness programming in accordance with partnerships that have been worked out with the Matsqui governing body and the neighbouring Sumas First Nation. Matsqui students' education success rates have been steadily improving over the past generation.

== Later developments ==
At the beginning of the twentieth century, most Matsqui people lived on the hill at Matsqui Main Reserve, where they were able to tend to their orchards and escape seasonal flooding. Later, however, as the dyke system improved, the Matsqui people increasingly began to move their houses to lower ground.

Many Matsqui homes were flooded during the 1948 Fraser River flood. Matsqui member Joan Silver remembers the dyke breaking: "I remember seeing my Aunt Helen's house [...] I don't know how many days it was. All you could see was [...] their chimney."

In 1995 and 1996, many of the old orchards at Matsqui Main Reserve were leveled when the band leased a portion of the reserve to a sand and gravel extraction company. The area of the extraction is now relatively flat, and covered with thin, deciduous trees.

Part of the Matsqui Main Reserve is accessible to non-members via the Greater Vancouver Regional District Trail, which runs through the reserve and forms part of the larger Trans Canada Trail.

In the summer of 2015, Matsqui completed the construction of a new Community Complex, complete with an Administration Building, Health Building and full size Gymnasium.

The previous Matsqui Sumas Abbotsford Hospital site (1953-2008), which is about 8 acres located at 2179 McCallum Rd, was turned to the Matsqui First Nation in 2008. Current application for a rental apartment has been submitted.

== Indian reserves ==
Today the Matsqui First Nation administers four reserves:

- Sahhacum - Matsqui Reserve #1, located east of Abbotsford, BC, and located on HWY 11 within the municipal boundaries of modern-day Abbotsford BC;
- Matsqui Main - Matsqui Reserve #2, located on the left bank of the Fraser River, southwest of Mission, on the south banks of the Fraser River within the Municipal Boundaries of modern day Abbotsford, BC;
- Three Islands - Matsqui Reserve #3, located in the Fraser River directly north of Matsqui Main in the District of modern day Mission, BC;
- Aldergrove - Matsqui Reserve #4, located along the International Boundary that separates Canada and the United States of America, within the boundaries of modern day Township of Langley.
