= Ulukhaktok =

Ulukhaktok Ulukhaqtuuq Uluqsaqtuuq
- Hamlet
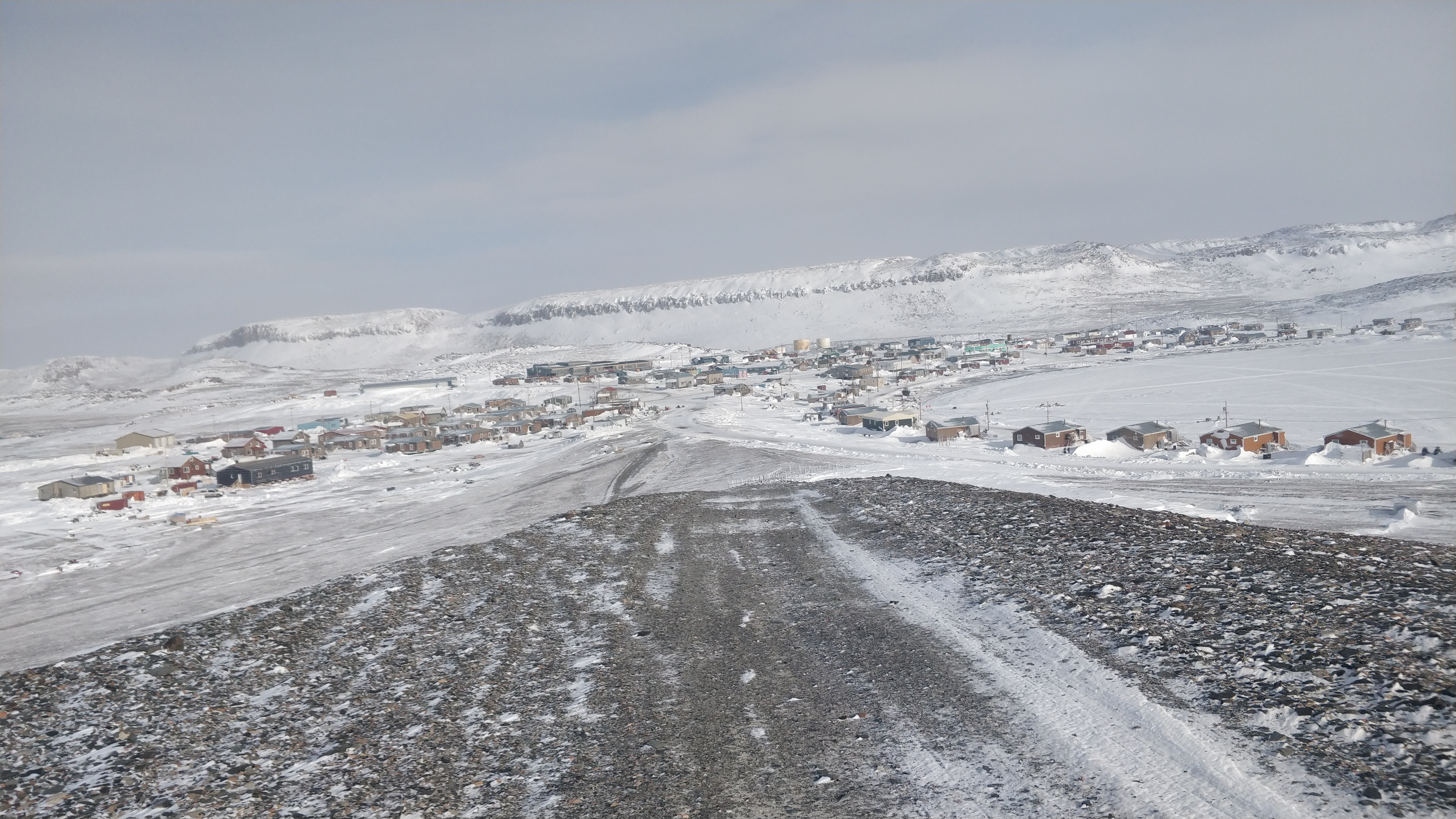
- Looking at Ulukhaktok from the bluffs that give the community its name

- Location within Northwest Territories Location within Canada
- Coordinates: 70°44′12″N 117°46′19″W
- Country: Canada
- Territory: Northwest Territories
- Government region: Inuvik Region
- Constituency: Nunakput
- Census division: Region 1
- Land claim: Inuvialuit Settlement Region
- Settled: 1937
- Incorporated (hamlet): 1 April 1984

Government
  - Mayor: Joshua Oliktoak
  - Acting Senior Administrative Officer: Mary Banksland
  - MLA: Jackie Jacobson

Area
  - Land: 120.71 km^{2} (46.61 sq mi)
- Elevation: 36 m (118 ft)
- Highest elevation: 36 m (118 ft)
- Lowest elevation: 0 m (0 ft)

Population (2021)
  - Total: 408
  - Density: 3.4/km^{2} (8.8/sq mi)
- Time zone: UTC−06:00 (Northwest Territories Time)
- Canadian Postal code: X0E 0S0
- Area code: 867
- Telephone exchange: 396
  - Living cost (2018): 192.5^{A}
  - Food price index (2019): 179.9^{B}
- Sources: Department of Municipal and Community Affairs, Prince of Wales Northern Heritage Centre, Canada Flight Supplement^A2018 figure based on Edmonton = 100^B2019 figure based on Yellowknife = 100

Ulukhaktok ((Kangiryuarmiutun (Inuit): Ulukhaqtuuq, pronounced [ulukhɑqtuːq̚]) and known until 1 April 2006 as Holman or Holman Island) is a small Inuvialuit Settlement Region hamlet on the west coast of Victoria Island, in the Inuvik Region of the Northwest Territories, Canada.

Like other small traditional communities in the territories, hunting, trapping, and fishing are major sources of income, but printmaking has taken over as the primary source of income in recent years. The two principal languages in Ulukhaktok are the Kangiryuarmiutun dialect of Inuinnaqtun, which is part of the Inuvialuktun group, and English.

The village has the world's most northerly golf course.

The community was covered in the Inuvialuit Final Agreement as part of their land claims and is in the Inuvialuit Settlement Region.

== History ==
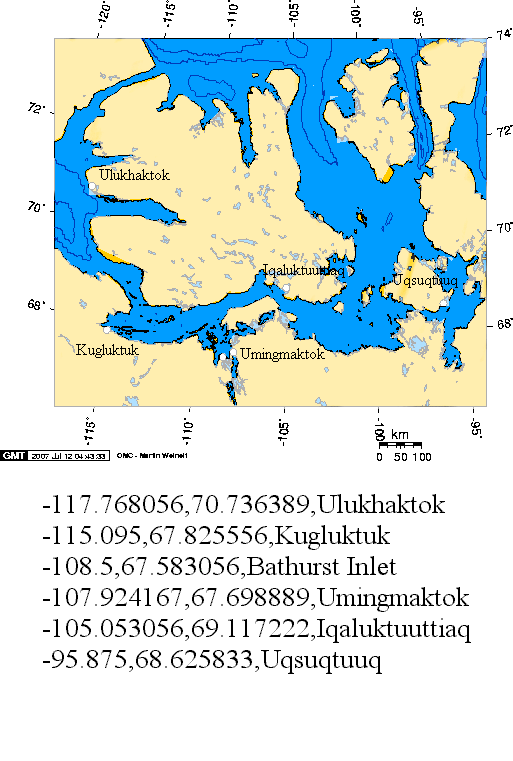
Communities where Inuinnaqtun is spoken including Ulukhaktok

The first people to settle in the area were Natkusiak and his family in 1937. Two years later, the Hudson's Bay Company relocated from Walker Bay and a Roman Catholic mission was opened the same year.

The English name, Holman, was in honour of J.R. Holman, a member of Sir Edward Augustus Inglefield's 1853 expedition in search for the Arctic explorer, John Franklin. The community was sometimes known as Holman Island. This, however, is the name of the small island outcrop to the east-southeast in the Amundsen Gulf.

In 2006, the community was renamed, Ulukhaktok, the traditional Kangiryuarmiutun name for the area, which means "the place where ulu parts are found", or "a large bluff where we used to collect raw material to make ulus". The large bluff that overlooks Ulukhaktok was the source that provided the slate and copper used to make ulus and give the community its name. Thus, the people who live there are called Ulukhaktokmiut [ulukhɑqtuːq̚miut] ("people of"). Ulukhaktokmiut is a recent word as no people actually lived permanently in this area until the opening of the Hudson's Bay Company store, although people did visit the area to obtain the ulu materials and camp en route to other nomadic seasonal camp areas.

Inuit traded with mainland groups as far east as King William Island and as far south as Great Bear Lake although most commerce occurred with the Inuvialuit and Copper Inuit populations indigenous to the Coppermine River watershed and Bernard Harbour seasonal areas on the mainland. The majority of Ulukhaktokmiut come from a varied background, with family ties extending mainly to the Coppermine River community of Kugluktuk, Nunavut and the communities of the Mackenzie River Delta and Beaufort Sea, though some families have relatives as far away as Gjoa Haven on King William Island, and along the north slope of Alaska as far as Port Clarence on the Seward Peninsula.

Some families are descendants of the Danish explorer-trader Christian Klengenberg. Others are descended from two members of the Vilhjalmur Stefansson-led Canadian Arctic Expedition. The first was Natkusiak, a friend of Stefansson, and the primary guide and lead hunter of the expedition. Originally from Port Clarence, Alaska he was later known as Billy Banksland, this name coming from his time trapping Arctic foxes on Banks Island. Another member of the expedition with relatives in the area was the Alaskan Iñupiat, Ikey Bolt from Point Hope. Married to Klengenberg's daughter Etna, they lived for several years at Rymer Point before moving to Minto Inlet and eventually to Coppermine (now Kugluktuk).

== Demographics ==
In the 2021 Census of Population conducted by Statistics Canada, Ulukhaktok had a population of 408 living in 134 of its 159 total private dwellings, a change of 3% from its 2016 population of 396. With a land area of 120.71 km^{2} (46.61 sq mi), it had a population density of 3.4/km^{2} (8.8/sq mi) in 2021.

In 2016, 370 (96.4%) of its residents were Inuvialuit or Inuit and the rest (3.6%) were non-Indigenous. The main languages in the community are Inuinnaqtun (Inuvialuktun) and English.

Federal census population history of Ulukhaktok
Year	Pop.	±%
1976	264	—
1981	300	+13.6%
1986	303	+1.0%
1991	361	+19.1%
1996	423	+17.2%
2001	398	−5.9%
2006	398	+0.0%
2011	402	+1.0%
2016	396	−1.5%
2021	408	+3.0%
Source: Statistics Canada

Annual population estimates

Year	Pop.	±%
1996	443	—
1997	450	+1.6%
1998	438	−2.7%
1999	435	−0.7%
2000	422	−3.0%
2001	416	−1.4%
2002	413	−0.7%
2003	425	+2.9%
2004	414	−2.6%
2005	426	+2.9%
2006	412	−3.3%
2007	424	+2.9%

Year	Pop.	±%
2008	429	+1.2%
2009	418	−2.6%
2010	432	+3.3%
2011	407	−5.8%
2012	408	+0.2%
2013	411	+0.7%
2014	420	+2.2%
2015	419	−0.2%
2016	419	+0.0%
2017	420	+0.2%
2018	461	+9.8%
2019	476	+3.3%

Sources: NWT Bureau of Statistics (2008–2019), NWT Bureau of Statistics (2001–2017)

== Economy ==
The hamlet has seen both sides of the rush for mineral exploration and has regained an appreciation for its wild places and culturally sensitive areas where long-gone relatives once survived and lived with the ice and snow. Some private concerns have witnessed the zeal with which these locals defend their competing interests for the same tracts of land and resources. Other companies have learned to work with residents and this has produced some hope for mineral development around traditional lands and other cultural areas of these Inuvialuit and their fellow Inuit brethren. Arts and crafts are also another source of income with international recognition of local artisans. Occasionally some residents travel to such places as San Francisco, California or Melbourne, Australia, but more often to other regional centres across the north.

Ulukhaktok is home to the Holman Eskimo Co-op founded in 1961 by the residents of the community with the help of Roman Catholic priest, Father Henri Tardy. The Co-op was formed to provide income to the residents of the community by producing arts and crafts, and is famous for the production of prints. Formally Holman Prints, artists in the community sell their art though the Ulukhaktok Arts Centre. Famous artists who have produced prints for the Holman Eskimo Co-op include Mary K. Okheena and Helen Kalvak. The local school, Helen Kalvak Elihakvik is named after her.

In the 1960s and 1970s Holman Eskimo Co-operative also created a number of sealskin products for southern markets, including parkas, tapestries and stuffed animals. The sealskin parkas were made to last and still show up on the market. The Prince of Wales Northern Heritage Centre in Yellowknife also has a parka in their collection.

In 2001 the Winnipeg Art Gallery curated an exhibition "Holman: Forty Years of Graphic Art/Quarante Ans D'Art Graphique " which produced an exhibition catalogue authored by Winnipeg Art Gallery Curator Darlene Coward Wight.

The Holman Eskimo Co-op is now involved in arts and crafts, retailing, the hotel business, and cable television. It operates both a Canada Post outlet, and the fuel delivery contract, and is the local Aklak Air agent.

Ulukhaktok is also the location of the world's most northern golf course and hosts the "Billy Joss Open Celebrity Golf Tournament" every summer. Over the years they have managed to attract players from the Edmonton Oilers and the Edmonton Eskimos (now the Elks), as well as golfers from other countries. This tournament is growing and features excursions to traditional areas where Arctic char and Northern Lake trout are harvested for subsistence as well as limited commercial fishing and hunting.

== Climate ==
Ulukhaktok has a tundra climate (ET) with short but cool summers and long cold winters.

Climate data for Ulukhaktok (Ulukhaktok/Holman Airport) Climate ID: 2502501; coordinates 70°45′46″N 117°48′22″W; elevation: 36.0 m (118.1 ft); 1991–2020 normals, extremes 1979−present
Month	Jan	Feb	Mar	Apr	May	Jun	Jul	Aug	Sep	Oct	Nov	Dec	Year
Record high humidex	−6.5	−9.1	−3.8	7.1	10.4	23.0	26.3	27.2	17.0	5.2	−1.8	−3.6	27.2
Record high °C (°F)	−4.0 (24.8)	−6.5 (20.3)	−3.5 (25.7)	7.6 (45.7)	11.5 (52.7)	22.6 (72.7)	29.0 (84.2)	25.5 (77.9)	15.8 (60.4)	5.9 (42.6)	1.1 (34.0)	−3.0 (26.6)	29.0 (84.2)
Mean daily maximum °C (°F)	−23.5 (−10.3)	−24.3 (−11.7)	−21.5 (−6.7)	−12.6 (9.3)	−2.8 (27.0)	7.9 (46.2)	13.0 (55.4)	9.9 (49.8)	3.3 (37.9)	−5.4 (22.3)	−14.3 (6.3)	−21.0 (−5.8)	−7.6 (18.3)
Daily mean °C (°F)	−27.2 (−17.0)	−28.0 (−18.4)	−25.5 (−13.9)	−16.9 (1.6)	−6.0 (21.2)	4.8 (40.6)	9.3 (48.7)	7.1 (44.8)	1.1 (34.0)	−8.1 (17.4)	−17.6 (0.3)	−24.4 (−11.9)	−10.9 (12.4)
Mean daily minimum °C (°F)	−30.8 (−23.4)	−31.6 (−24.9)	−29.5 (−21.1)	−21.2 (−6.2)	−9.2 (15.4)	1.6 (34.9)	5.6 (42.1)	4.2 (39.6)	−1.0 (30.2)	−10.6 (12.9)	−20.9 (−5.6)	−27.7 (−17.9)	−14.3 (6.3)
Record low °C (°F)	−47.5 (−53.5)	−49.0 (−56.2)	−45.0 (−49.0)	−42.1 (−43.8)	−30.3 (−22.5)	−12.5 (9.5)	−3.5 (25.7)	−5.5 (22.1)	−15.5 (4.1)	−36.8 (−34.2)	−37.5 (−35.5)	−42.8 (−45.0)	−49.0 (−56.2)
Record low wind chill	−59.8	−65.9	−62.0	−49.2	−39.4	−21.3	−7.6	−12.1	−19.3	−36.0	−50.8	−53.1	−65.9
Average precipitation mm (inches)	10.2 (0.40)	8.9 (0.35)	10.5 (0.41)	7.5 (0.30)	8.9 (0.35)	10.9 (0.43)	23.6 (0.93)	31.5 (1.24)	22.5 (0.89)	17.2 (0.68)	13.4 (0.53)	10.6 (0.42)	175.7 (6.92)
Average rainfall mm (inches)	0.0 (0.0)	0.0 (0.0)	0.0 (0.0)	0.0 (0.0)	1.2 (0.05)	8.7 (0.34)	21.9 (0.86)	30.6 (1.20)	13.0 (0.51)	0.7 (0.03)	0.0 (0.0)	0.0 (0.0)	76.1 (3.00)
Average snowfall cm (inches)	9.7 (3.8)	7.9 (3.1)	8.3 (3.3)	5.8 (2.3)	5.9 (2.3)	1.3 (0.5)	0.0 (0.0)	2.0 (0.8)	7.2 (2.8)	18.9 (7.4)	15.0 (5.9)	9.9 (3.9)	91.8 (36.1)
Average precipitation days (≥ 0.2 mm)	8.8	8.0	8.3	6.7	6.9	6.4	9.3	12.6	11.9	11.5	10.6	8.7	109.7
Average rainy days (≥ 0.2 mm)	0.06	0.0	0.0	0.0	0.56	4.5	8.0	11.1	6.6	0.31	0.0	0.0	31.1
Average snowy days (≥ 0.2 cm)	6.1	5.6	6.2	4.5	4.7	1.2	0.06	0.71	3.8	10.6	9.3	6.4	58.9
Average relative humidity (%) (at 1500 LST)	76.4	75.9	75.2	71.2	74.4	73.1	69.4	75.8	79.7	84.5	83.3	78.5	76.4
Source: Environment and Climate Change Canada

== Notable people ==
- Mary K. Okheena (born 1957), graphic artist

== See also ==
- Legislative Assembly of the Northwest Territories
- List of municipalities in the Northwest Territories
- Ulukhaktok/Holman Airport
