= Prince Albert Sound =

Body of water in North Canada

- Location in the Northwest Territories
- Location: Victoria Island
- Coordinates: 70°30′N 115°00′W
- Ocean/sea sources: Amundsen Gulf
- Basin countries: Northwest Territories, Canada
- Max. length: 277 km (172 mi)
- Max. width: 64 km (40 mi)

Prince Albert Sound (Inuit: Kangiryuak) is a Northern Canadian body of water located in the Inuvik Region of southwestern Victoria Island, Northwest Territories. It is an inlet of Amundsen Gulf. The sound separates the Wollaston Peninsula from the island's central areas. On 14 May 1851, some of Robert McClure's men reached its north side. Ten days later, John Rae (explorer) reached its south side, but the two groups had no contact.

Prince Albert Sound is 172 mi (277 km) long and 40 mi (64 km) wide.

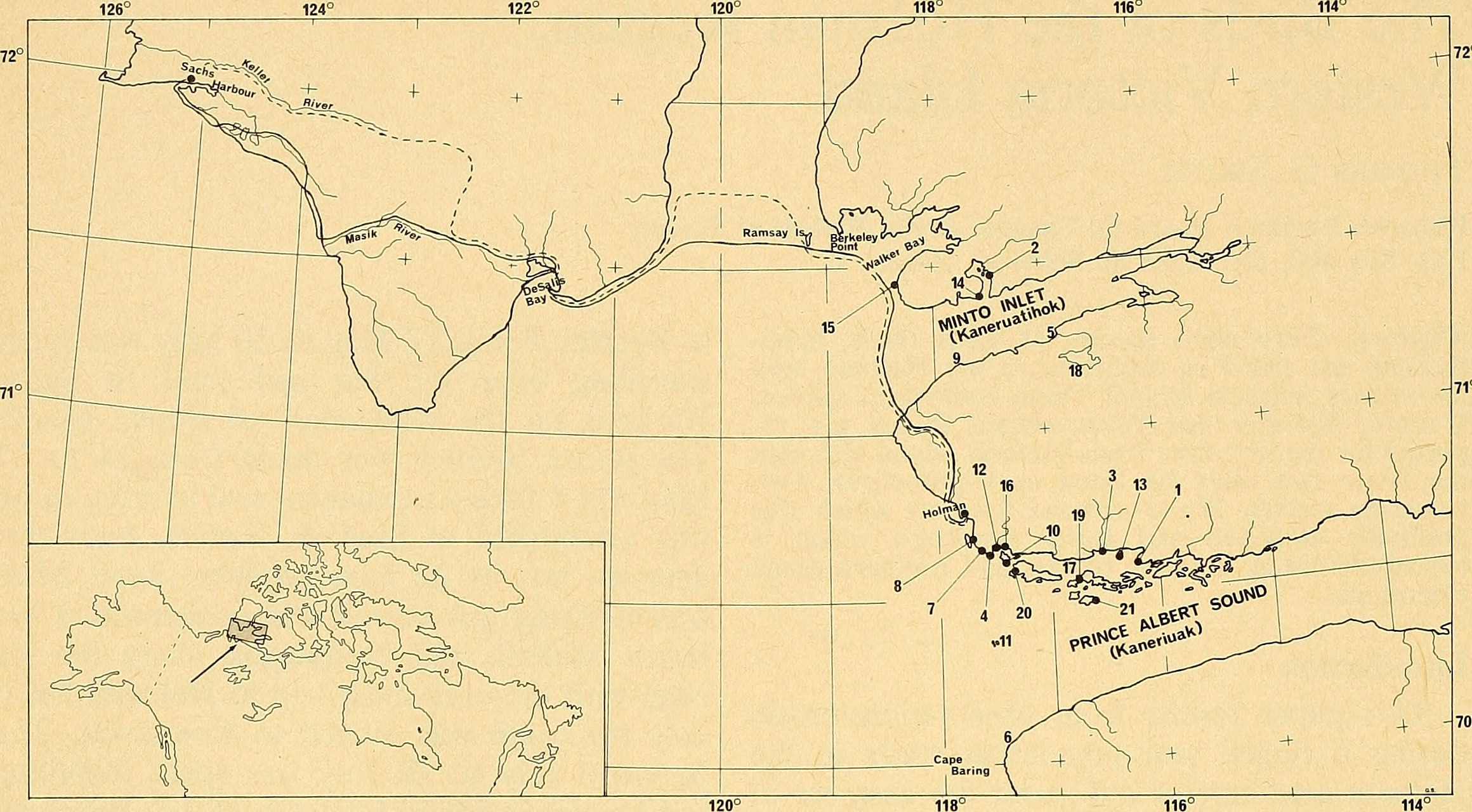
Map showing the Prince Albert Sound and Minto Inlet.
