= Minto Inlet =

- Location in the Northwest Territories
- Location: Victoria Island
- Coordinates: 71°15′N 117°0′W
- Ocean/sea sources: Amundsen Gulf
- Basin countries: Northwest Territories, Canada
- Max. length: 121 km (75 mi)
- Max. width: 19 km (12 mi)

Minto Inlet is located east of Amundsen Gulf in western Victoria Island, at the southern end of Prince of Wales Strait in the Northwest Territories. It is 75 mi (121 km) long and between 8–25 mi (13–40 km) wide.

The inlet is part of the historical territory of the Copper Inuit. It continues to be notable for the Minto Inlet caribou herd calving grounds. Richard Collinson wintered here in 1851/52.

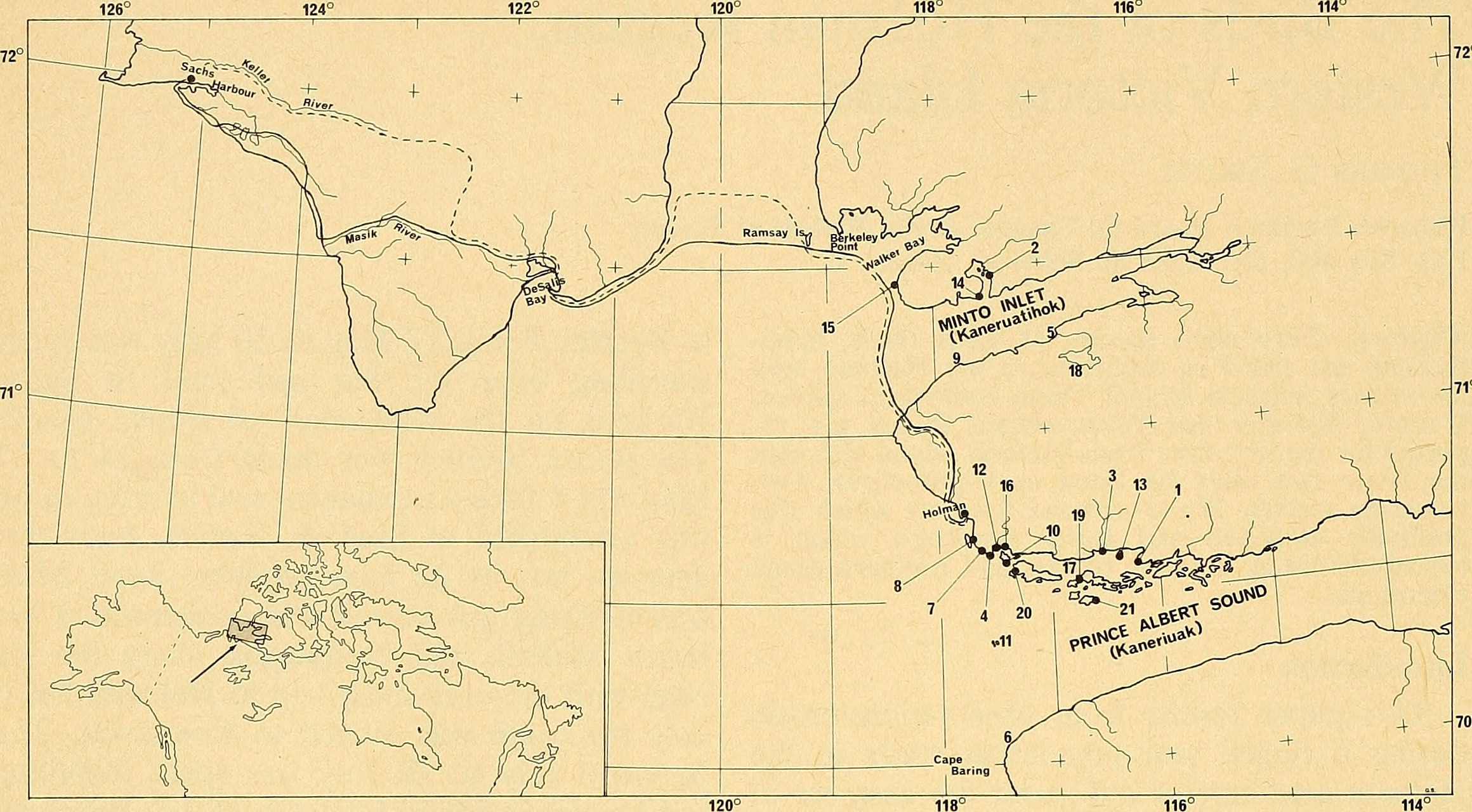
Map of the Minto Inlet area
