= Diamond Jenness =

Canadian anthropologist

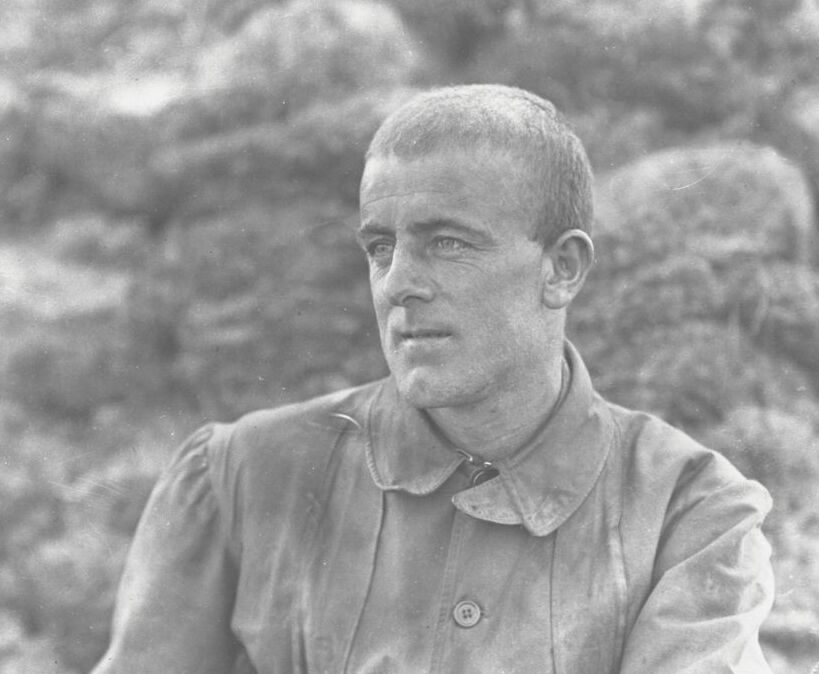
- Diamond Jenness at Bernard Harbour, 1916
- Born: February 10, 1886; Wellington, New Zealand
- Died: November 29, 1969 (aged 83); Chelsea, Quebec, Canada
- Resting place: Beechwood Cemetery, Ottawa, Ontario, Canada
- Education: University of New Zealand; University of Oxford
- Occupation: Anthropologist
- Employer: National Museum of Canada
- Known for: His comprehensive early studies of Canada's First Nation's people and the Copper Inuit.
- Title: President of the American Anthropological Association
- Term: 1939
- Predecessor: Edward Sapir
- Successor: John Montgomery Cooper
- Spouse: Frances Eilleen Jenness
- Children: John L. Jenness; Stuart E. Jenness; Robert A. Jenness

Diamond Jenness, CC FRCGS (February 10, 1886, Wellington, New Zealand – November 29, 1969, Chelsea, Quebec, Canada) was one of Canada's greatest early scientists and a pioneer of Canadian anthropology.

== Early life (1886–1910) ==
University of Oxford Anthropology Diploma class of 1910–11. Jenness is in the center of the back row.

=== Family and childhood ===
Diamond Jenness was the second youngest son in a middle-class family of ten children. His father's profession was that of a watchmaker / jeweller, though he also installed several clocks in municipal building towers in New Zealand. The family was encouraged to read, learn music, and engage in sports. Barnett Richling, in his biography In Twilight and in Dawn writes that the young Jenness "was a proficient outdoorsman and an accomplished sharpshooter," skills that helped prepare him for his experience in the Arctic years later.

=== Education ===
At an early age, Jenness showed proficiency for learning. He earned his first scholarship at the age of twelve by entering a composition competition for children under fourteen. In those days, in New Zealand, secondary education was only available to the wealthier families, so this scholarship enabled Jenness to complete high school and three years of college. He finished his final year of secondary education with six prizes: mathematics, science, Latin, French and English, and was named top student. He attended Lower Hutt School, then Wellington College. He and sister May were the only two siblings to proceed on to college.

Jenness graduated from the University of New Zealand (from the constituent college then called Victoria University College) (BA, 1907; MA, 1908), receiving first class honours for both degrees. Then, when 22 years old, he received a scholarship that allowed him to pursue further education at Balliol College, a constituent college of the University of Oxford (Diploma in Anthropology, 1910; MA, 1916).

== Career (1911–1948) ==
=== Field work – Northern D'Entrecasteaux ===
From 1911 to 1912, as an Oxford Scholar, he studied a little-known group of people on the D'Entrecasteaux Islands in eastern Papua New Guinea. Jenness comments:

They peered at me from out-of-the-way corners, or through the doors of their huts, always at a safe distance. Recalling a children's [game] I had learned in one of the coast villages, I stooped down, tapped the ground with my fingers and chanted the refrain. The children drew nearer and nearer, and one or two with broad smiles began to imitate me. Then with a piece of string, I made some of their own cat's cradle figures and held them out for their inspection. This turned the scale. Five minutes later a laughing crowd surrounded me...The natives could hardly believe that I was a white man, and kept asking my [guides] who I was, how I came to speak their language and where I had learned their game.

— Diamond Jenness, Through Darkening Spectacles: Memoirs of Diamond Jenness

=== Canadian Arctic Expedition ===
In 1913, Jenness was invited to join the government-funded Canadian Arctic Expedition (CAE) that was led by two Arctic explorers - Vilhjalmur Stefansson and Rudolph Martin Anderson. He would be one of the two anthropologists on board; the other was Henri Beuchat. In June of that year, having barely recuperated from yellow fever contracted while in New Guinea, Jenness boarded HMCS Karluk, a brigantine formerly used as a whaling ship, along with 12 other scientists. The ship steamed up the British Columbia coastline towards Nome, Alaska, where they met up with Stefansson who had purchased two 18 m (60 ft) schooners to assist in the expedition work. The three vessels then proceeded towards their rendezvous point, Herschel Island, just east of the mouth of the Mackenzie River, Northwest Territories.

The rendezvous never took place. On August 12, the Karluk became locked in the sea ice. Stefansson, with his secretary, Burt McConnell, Jenness, Hubert Wilkins, and two Inuit (known then by the exonym as Eskimos), set out to procure meat for the crew. While they were ashore, the Karluk drifted westward to the East Siberian Sea, where, on its last voyage, the ship was eventually crushed in the ice off Wrangel Island. Thirteen of the crew perished on board, including Henri Beuchat.

With the ship gone, the hunting party set off on foot towards Utqiagvik, Alaska (then known as Barrow), 240 km (150 mi) away, hoping to meet the two other vessels involved in the expedition: the Mary Sachs and Alaska. In Barrow, they learned that the two ships had anchored in Camden Bay, Alaska making it their winter base. Jenness remained behind and spent the first winter at Harrison Bay, Alaska, where he learned how to speak the Iñupiaq language, and compiled information about their customs and folklore. The next year, in 1914, assisted by interpreter Patsy Klengenberg (son of Gremnia, a Tikigaq from Point Hope, Alaska (Tigerah) and the trader Christian Klengenberg), Jenness commenced studying the Copper Inuit, sometimes called the Blond Eskimos, in the Coronation Gulf area. This group of people had had very little contact with Europeans, and Jenness, now the only anthropologist, was solely in charge of recording the Indigenous way of life in this area.

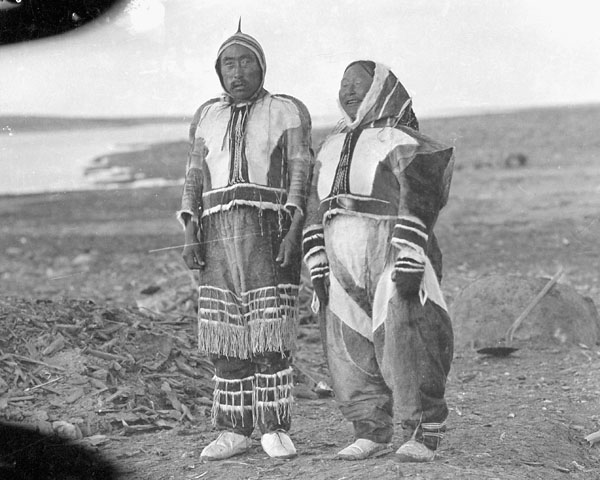
Hubert Wilkins photograph of Ikpukhuak and his angakkuq wife Higalik

Jenness spent two years with the Copper Inuit and lived as an adopted son of a hunter named Ikpukhuak and his wife Higalik, an angakkuq or shaman, (name meaning Ice House). During that time he hunted and travelled with his "family," sharing both their festivities and their famine. By living with this Inuit family and partaking in their everyday experiences, Jenness did something that was "not often employed by other ethnologists" at the time: he lived with the people who were the subjects of his fieldwork. As David Morrison in his Arctic Hunters: The Inuit and Diamond Jenness states:

His goal was to understand the Copper Inuit on their own terms, not in relation to some preconceived 'ladder of creation' with Europeans perched firmly at the top.

— David Morrison, Arctic Hunters: The Inuit and Diamond Jenness

Summarizing his first year with the Copper Inuit, Jenness wrote:

By Isolating myself among the Eskimos ... I had followed their wanderings day by day from autumn round to autumn. I had observed their reactions to every season, the disbanding of the tribes and their reassembling, the migrations from sea to land and from land to sea, the diversion from sealing to hunting, hunting to fishing, fishing to hunting, and then to sealing again. All these changes caused by their economic environment I had seen and studied; now, with a greater knowledge of the language, I could concentrate on other phases of their life and history.

— Diamond Jenness, The People of the Twilight

As anthropologist Frederica de Laguna noted years later, his "accomplishments are the more remarkable when it is remembered that Jenness had to perform not only his own duties but [also] those of his unfortunate colleague, Beauchat." Furthermore, Jenness's camera, anthropometric instruments, books, papers and even heavy winter clothing had all remained on board the ill-fated HMCS Karluk.

The CAE scientists kept daily diary logs, took extensive research notes, and collected samples which were shipped or brought back to Ottawa. Jenness collected a variety of ethnological materials from clothing and hunting tools to stories and games, and 137 wax phonographic cylinder song recordings he had made. The latter's musical transcription and analysis by Columbia University's Hellen H. Roberts with Jenness's word translations can be found in the monograph "Songs of the Copper Eskimos" (1925). Eight of Jenness's recordings could be heard at the CKUG-FM website, located in Kugluktuk, Nunavut, Canada. The website also features a short video demonstrating how Jenness recorded these songs with the technology available in 1913.

==== Copper Inuit subgroups studied by Jenness ====
Several subgroups were reported on by Jenness and they include:

- Akuliakattagmiut
- Haneragmiut
- Kogluktogmiut
- Pallirmiut
- Puiplirmiut
- Uallirgmiut (Kanianermiut)

==== Origin of the Copper Inuit and their copper culture ====
In his article in Geographical Review, Jenness described how the Copper Inuit are more closely related to tribes of the east and southeast in comparison to western cultural groups, basing his conclusion on archaeological remains, materials used for housing, weapons, utensils, art, tattoos, customs, traditions, religion, and also linguistic patterns. He also considered how the dead are handled: whether they are covered by stone or wood, without any artifacts, as in the west, or "as in the east, laid out on the surface of the ground, unprotected but with replicas of their clothing and miniature implements placed beside them.".

Jenness characterized the "Copper Eskimos" as being in a pseudo-metal stage, in between the Stone and Iron Ages, because this cultural group treated copper as simply a malleable stone which is hammered into tools and weapons. He discussed whether the use of copper arose independently with different cultural groups or in one group and was then "borrowed" by others. Jenness goes on to explain that indigenous communities began to use copper first and following this, Inuit adopted it. He cited the fact that slate was previously used among Inuit and was replaced by copper at a later time after the indigenous communities had begun to use it.

=== First World War ===
The scientific members of the Canadian Arctic Expedition completed their mission and left the north in 1916. Jenness was assigned an office in the Victoria Museum (now the Canadian Museum of Nature) of Ottawa and instructed to write up his expedition findings. After six months of feverishly working on his collections, notes, and initial reports for the government, Jenness, concerned about the events in Europe, enlisted in the Canadian Expeditionary Force and served in France and Belgium as a gunner in the field artillery. Being of slight build and short of stature, he was assigned to duties other than direct combat.

=== Field work and writing ===
In December 1918, Jenness applied and received military leave to finish writing his Papua studies report in Oxford, (delayed due his having joined the CAE and then the war). While in Oxford, he received word that his unit was one of the first to be sent home from the war. Jenness returned to Ottawa in March 1919, and the next month married his fiancé, Eileen Bleakney. After their honeymoon in New Zealand, Jenness set about writing up his Arctic reports, and produced eight government reports in five volumes, totalling 1,368 pages. Richling states: "The scientific results of the Canadian Arctic Expedition filled fifteen volumes. One-third of them contained the product of Jenness's investigations."

==== Canadian First Nations ====
A year and a half after his return from the war, the Government of Canada made his employment at the Victoria Memorial Museum permanent, and he was assigned to study many of the First Nations tribes of Canada. (Jenness's employment had previously been on a yearly contract basis.)

The Tsuutʼina Nation (then known as Sarcee), on the Tsuu T'ina 145 reserve in Calgary, Alberta, were the first of many First Nations in Jenness's fieldwork. That experience also provided his first encounter with the deplorable conditions Canada's Indigenous peoples experienced on Indian reserves. After the Tsuutʼina, Jenness undertook fieldwork study of the Sekani, Beothuk (extinct), Ojibwe, and Coast Salish. Collins and Taylor refer to Jenness's Indians of Canada (1931c) as "the definitive work on the Canadian aborigines, dealing comprehensively with the ethnology and history of the Canadian Indians and Eskimos".

==== Archaeological discoveries ====
Although most of Jenness's time was devoted to Indian studies and administrative duties, he also identified two very important prehistoric Inuit cultures: the Dorset culture in Canada (in 1925) and the Old Bering Sea culture in Alaska (in 1926), for which he later was named "Father of Eskimo Archaeology." These archaeological findings were fundamental in explaining migration patterns, and Jenness's views were thought to be "radical" at that time. Helmer states: "These theories are now widely accepted, having been vindicated by carbon-14 dating and subsequent field research."

=== Administrative duties ===
In 1926, Jenness succeeded Canada's first Chief Anthropologist, Dr. Edward Sapir, as Chief of Anthropology at the National Museum of Canada, a position he retained until his retirement in 1948. During the intervening years, although hampered by the Great Depression and the Second World War, he "strove passionately, but with mixed success, to improve the knowledge and welfare of Canada's aboriginal peoples and to enhance the international reputation of the National Museum."

Other administrative duties during this time include representing Canada at the Fourth Pacific Science Congress in 1929, and chairing the Anthropological Section of the First Pacific Science Congress in 1933, held by the Pacific Science Association. Jenness also served as Canada's official delegate to the International Congress of Anthropological and Ethnological Sciences in Copenhagen, 1938.

=== Second World War and its aftermath ===
In 1941, eager to contribute to the war effort, he was seconded to the Royal Canadian Air Force, where he served until 1944 as civilian deputy director of Special Intelligence. In 1944, he was made chief of the newly established Inter-Services Topographic Section (ISTS), the non-military section of the Canadian Department of National Defence (patterned after a similar British military intelligence organization, the Inter-Service Topographical Department.) Jenness retained this position when, in 1947, the Canadian ISTS unit changed its name, becoming the Geographic Bureau, and was placed under the Department of Mines and Resources.

== Retirement years (1948–1969) ==
During his retirement, Jenness continued to travel, research, and publish. (Note: See Through Darkening Spectacles, Table 2, p. 364 for a complete table of locations visited.) He also taught courses at universities, such as the University of British Columbia (1951) and McGill University (1955), on Arctic ethnology and archaeology.

From 1949 until his death in 1969, Jenness published more than two dozen writings, including the monographs: The Corn Goddess and other tales from Indian Canada (1956), Dawn in Arctic Alaska (1957) a popular account of the one year (1913 to 1914) he spent among the Iñupiat of Arctic Alaska, The Economics of Cypress (1962), and four scholarly reports on Eskimo Administration in Alaska, Canada, Labrador, and Greenland, plus a fifth report providing an analysis and overview of the four government systems (published between 1962 and 1968 by the Arctic Institute of North America). He was able to complete these writings due to Guggenheim Fellowship award given in 1953 to further "whatever scholarly purposes he deemed fit," an award that amounted to more than two and half times his annual pension from the Canadian government. When health prevented him from escaping Canada's bitter winters, he commenced writing his memoir, a project which his son, Stuart Edward Jenness, "completed" and published in 2008 under the title Through Darkening Spectacles.

== Role in applied anthropology ==
Jenness entered the field of anthropology at its outset and was able to study cultures that had experienced little or no previous interaction with "white" people. He began his career engaging in the early traditional fields: ethnology, linguistics, physical (biological), and archaeology. But as he noticed the decline in the morale, economics and health of Canada's indigenous peoples, he shifted his attention towards applied anthropology. Richling, who spent over two decades studying the professional life of Jenness, writes, "Jenness's interest in Indian affairs deepened in the thirties out of concern for the worsening crisis among Native peoples wrought by the Great Depression and the effects of a long-outmoded government policy of 'Bible and Plough'."

=== Recommendations to deputy minister (1936) ===
In his biography In Twilight and in Dawn, Richling writes that in 1936 Jenness sent a memo to Charles Camsell, the then Deputy Minister of Mines and Resources, stating the reserves "had degenerated into a 'system of permanent segregation,' one whose inhabitants have been stripped of all but a token remnant of control over their own material and spiritual well-being. Rather than bringing opportunity, choice, and self-sufficiency, reserves brought hardship, hopelessness, and dependency, 'destroy[ing] their morale and their health' making them outcasts in the wider society." Jenness recommended:

1. closing of separate schools;
2. creation of scholarships for attending high school, technical schools, and in special cases universities;
3. establishing follow-up after completion of school to help ensure they had steady employment;
4. not enforcing the Potash Law;
5. improving Indian health services;
6. protecting native hunting and trapping grounds.

His suggestions appear to have had little influence. The government shifted attention away from domestic problems when the Second World War broke out, and Jenness (being too old for combat) was assigned temporary duties to assist in war efforts at home. Shortly after the war, he is recorded as having said: "Unhappily nearly all our Indians today—not only the northern ones, but those in the south, too, who live on reserves, whether here in the east or on the prairies or in British Columbia—have lost their dignity, their self-reliance and self-respect."

=== Joint parliamentary committee meeting (1947) ===
In 1947, Jenness – officially billed as "Dominion Anthropologist" – was called before a joint parliamentary committee to share his views and answer questions. He presented a plan to address what he referred to as the "immorally indefensible" state of First Nations social and economic conditions. His plan was based upon New Zealand's management of its native affairs since the early 1860s, which, in his view, was being administered successfully at that time. "Because they are 'free citizens,' " Jenness stated, "Maori are neither segregated on reserves, nor subject to state-sanctioned institutional barriers limiting their participation in national life." He pointed out that Māori were treated as full and equal citizens but also encouraged to maintain their distinct cultural identity, values, and traditions. They were allowed to attend public schools and hold government office. Their local communities were becoming largely self-governing - operating in accord with customary tribal authority yet with access to courts to settle land disputes.

=== Some modern viewpoints ===
Some anthropologists are critical of the role played by Diamond Jenness in Canadian state policies. Lisa Stevenson, one of Jenness's modern critics who references Peter Kulchyski's views in her book, concludes that his solution for Inuit groups was to "ensure that in a 'definite and not too remote' future there will be 'no such thing' as an Indian or an Eskimo." These critics say that a focus on assimilation destroys the cultural identity of the indigenous peoples.

Richling points out that fifteen years before he presented his plan, Jenness had "pessimistically predicted in The Indians of Canada that social and economic forces had already foreclosed on the cultural (and for some, even physical) survival of nearly all Canada's Aboriginal peoples."

At the meeting in 1947, Jenness, as before in his memo to the Deputy Minister Camsell, emphasized the importance of education and vocational training to assist these already displaced peoples in becoming more self-sufficient. Using the example of Inuit in Greenland and Siberia, he suggested teaching the migratory northern First Nations skills for trades such as airplane pilot and mechanic, mineral prospecting, wireless operation, game and forest protection, and fur farming.

Jenness also pointed out that Japanese children were attending schools with white children in British Columbia while less than a kilometre away First Nations children attended segregated schools. In response to his comment, one of the committee members said that this was his district and he'd personally observed Japanese students in classrooms with white children. He added that the Japanese and [west coast] Indians are both members of Oriental races, a fact that had been overlooked, and to put the Indian children in separate schooling, in his opinion, was wrong.

Another criticism of Jenness is that he "cared about the Inuit: he didn't want them to become dependent on welfare and thus demoralized, and he wanted them to be as resourceful as their ancestors. However, his way of caring ignored who they were or wanted to become."

In the same 1947 parliamentary proceedings the critic refers to, Jenness told the committee there certainly were other approaches to be weighed [than the ones he suggested], especially those originating with the peoples whose future hung in the balance. The committee then questioned him whether he felt the First Nations themselves should be asked what they think? Jenness responded "Yes." He continued to say he felt a proposed plan should be shared with them, and their views should be considered. "I think you would get some very constructive ideas from some of the Indians," he said.

A truth we often overlook, [is] that the strongest forces for the regeneration or upbuilding of peoples comes from within their own ranks, not from without.

— Barnett Richling quoting Jenness, In Twilight and in Dawn: A Biography of Diamond Jenness

=== Outcome of the 1947 meeting ===
"In the end," Richling writes, "little of a practical nature came of Jenness's proposals on policy reform in the early post-war period." During the next decade, the government reorganized its bureaucratic departments, replaced mission-run residential schools with state-run (but not integrated) day schools, and offered social benefits such as unemployment insurance, child allowances, and universal health care.

In 1968, in the appendix of Eskimo Administration: V. Analysis and Reflections, Jenness included his proposed plan to help the indigenous peoples of Canada's north become more self-sufficient. He again emphasized the importance of vocational training, giving several specific suggestions such as establishing a small Seaman's School (Navigation School) to train Inuit youth. Denmark, Jenness wrote, was helping her indigenous by training fishermen to work offshore in well-equipped vessels, and training seaman in a seaman's school at Kogtved, Denmark—a school with an international reputation—then enlisting them among crew for Arctic and Antarctic navigation.

=== 21st-century reflections ===
Richling not only provides biographical information on the professional life of Jenness in In Twilight and in Dawn, he objectively reviews many opposing viewpoints of Jenness's role in applied anthropology — including his own. He shares that critics' arguments range from his being "a well-intentioned … supporter of assimilation, … [to] an ardent imperialist idealogue" then concludes with the following quotes in his last chapter:

'Today, makes yesterday mean.'
Emily Dickinson's gnomic utterance contains at least one undoubted truth -- that the perspectives of the present invariably color the meanings we ascribe to the past.

— Barnett Richling who includes quote from Douglas Wilson

== Recognition ==
=== Awards and honours ===
Diamond Jenness received many distinguished awards and in recognition of his contributions to his profession. In 1953 Jenness was awarded a Guggenheim Fellowship. In 1962, he was awarded the Massey Medal by the Royal Canadian Geographical Society, and in 1968 he was made a Companion of the Order of Canada, Canada's highest honour. Between 1935 and 1968, he was awarded honorary doctorate degrees from the University of New Zealand, University of Waterloo, University of Saskatchewan, Carleton University, and McGill University. In 1973, the Canadian government designated him a Person of National Historic Significance and in the same year the Diamond Jenness Secondary School in Hay River was named after him. In 1978, the Canadian Government named the middle peninsula on the west coast of Victoria Island for him, and in 1998 Maclean's magazine listed him as one of the 100 most important Canadians in history as well as third among the ten foremost Canadian scientists. In 2004, his name was used for a rock examined by the Mars exploration rover Opportunity.

=== Appointments ===
Moreau writes that Jenness held many high posts in professional societies, demonstrating the high regard he was held in by his colleagues. For example, Jenness was vice-president and later President of the American Anthropological Association, (1937-1940), President of the Society for American Archaeology (1937), and vice-president of Section H (Anthropology) of the American Association for the Advancement of Science (1938).

== Publications ==
During his lifetime, Jenness authored more than 100 works on Canada's Inuit and First Nations people. Chief among these are his scholarly government report, Life of the Copper Eskimos (published 1922), his ever-popular account of two years with the Copper Inuit, The People of the Twilight (published 1928), his definitive and durable The Indians of Canada (published 1932 and now in its seventh edition), and four scholarly reports on Eskimo Administration in Alaska, Canada, Labrador, and Greenland, plus a fifth report providing an analysis and overview of the four government systems (published between 1962 and 1968 by the Arctic Institute of North America). He also published a popular account of the one year (1913 to 1914) he spent among the Iñupiat of Arctic Alaska, Dawn in Arctic Alaska (published 1957 and 1985). (Note: For a complete list of Jenness's 138 articles and publications, please refer to Appendix 2 in Through Darkening Spectacles: Memoirs of Diamond Jenness by Diamond Jenness and Stuart E. Jenness, Canadian Museum of Civilization, Mercury Series, (2008). Dr. Frederica de Laguna's obituary of Jenness in the American Anthropologist lists 109 publications, and the University of Calgary's: Arctic 23-2-71 obituary of Jenness by Collins, Henry B. & Taylor, William E. Jr. lists 98.)

== Biographies ==
Nansi Swayze published a brief popular account about Jenness's life in The Man Hunters (1960).

The Canadian Museum of Civilization published Through Darkening Spectacles: Memoirs of Diamond Jenness (2008). The story is told primarily by Diamond himself with additional sections by his son Stuart Jenness. This biography covers his professional and personal life.

Barnett Richling has, since 1989, published several articles on various aspects of Jenness's life, and a complete, scholarly biography of Jenness's professional life: In Twilight and in Dawn: A Biography of Diamond Jenness published in 2012 by McGill–Queen's University Press.

== See also ==
- Uloqsaq
- String figure
