= Kogluktogmiut =

Copper Inuit subgroup

Kogluktogmiut (alternate: Kogloktogmiut) were a geographically defined Copper Inuit subgroup in the Canadian territory of Nunavut. They were located by Bloody Falls (Inuktitut: Kogluktok; meaning: "it flows rapidly" or "spurts like a cut artery"), a waterfall on the lower course of the Coppermine River in the Kugluk/Bloody Falls Territorial Park, notable for the Bloody Falls massacre.

Studies by anthropologist Diamond Jenness showed that the subgroups of Akuliakattagmiut, Haneragmiut, Kogluktogmiut, Pallirmiut, Puiplirmiut, and Uallirgmiut (also known as the Kanianermiut) mixed through intermarriage and by family shifting.
