= Pallirmiut =

Geographically defined Copper Inuit group in the Canadian Arctic territory of Nunavut

Pallirmiut were a geographically defined Copper Inuit group in the Canadian Arctic territory of Nunavut. They were located by the mouth of the Rae River (Pallirk) during the spring. Some stayed there during summers, while others joined the Kogluktogmiut at the Bloody Falls summer salmon fishery. Pallirmiut wintered on west central Coronation Gulf, and went inland when the snow was gone, carrying packs rather than using sleds.

== Ethnology ==
While some Copper Inuit did not eat seal and caribou at the same meal, Pallirmiut did, as did Akuliakattagmiut, Kangiryuarmiut, Kogluktogmiut, Nagyuktogmiut, Noahonirmiut, and Puiplirmiut. Pallirmiut traded with white men more so than other Copper Inuit for items such as guns.

Studies by anthropologist Diamond Jenness showed that the Akuliakattagmiut, Haneragmiut, Kogluktogmiut, Pallirmiut, Puiplirmiut, and Uallirgmiut intermarried and mixed through family shifting.
