= Geography of Nunavut =

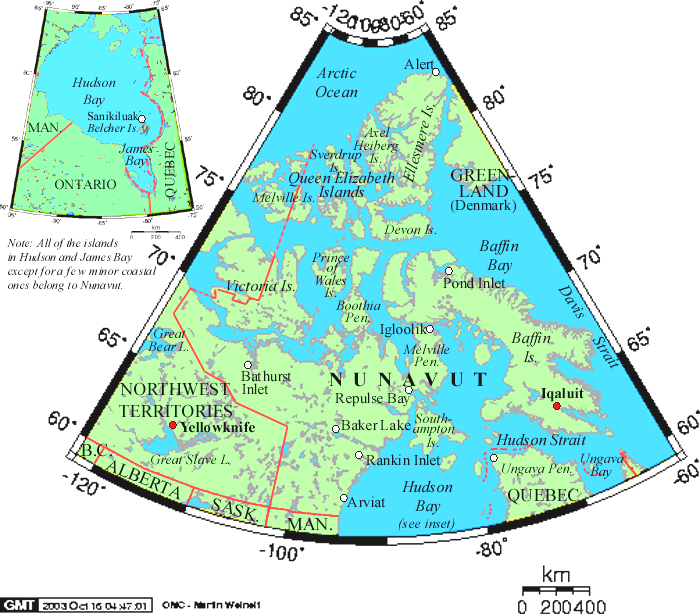
Nunavut

The Canadian territory of Nunavut lies mainly in the North American Arctic and covers about 1,994,071 km^{2} (769,915 sq mi) (1,836,994 km^{2} [709,267 sq mi] land and 157,077 km^{2} [60,648 sq mi] water) of land and water including part of the mainland, most of the islands in the Arctic Archipelago, and all of the islands in Hudson Bay, James Bay, and Ungava Bay (including the Belcher Islands and Akimiski Island) which belonged to the Northwest Territories before Nunavut was split from them on 1 April 1999.

This makes it the fifth largest country subdivision in the world. If Nunavut were a country, it would rank 13th in area, after Saudi Arabia. Nunavut has land borders with Manitoba, the Northwest Territories on several islands as well as the mainland, and a tiny land border with Newfoundland and Labrador on Killiniq Island.

Additionally, Nunavut has a land border with Greenland on Hans Island, making it the only Canadian jurisdiction to have a land border with a country other than the United States.

== Physical geography ==
The mountains on the easternmost coasts of Nunavut are part of the Arctic Cordillera which stretches from northernmost Ellesmere Island to the northernmost tip of Labrador.

The highest point is Barbeau Peak which offers some of the world's most spectacular scenery.

Geologically, Nunavut lies on the Canadian Shield, with very thin soil lying on top of the bedrock, and many bare outcrops. The multitude of rivers and lakes in the entire region is caused by the watersheds of the area being so young and in a state of sorting themselves out with the added effect of post-glacial rebound. Virtually all of Nunavut's rivers drain into the Arctic Ocean or Hudson Bay, an inland sea of the Arctic Ocean.

Arctic tundra (Köppen climate classification ET) covers virtually all of Nunavut, the only exceptions being the area roughly between the Four Corners and Ennadai and Nueltin lakes, where a marginal taiga or boreal forest exists, and small zones of permanent ice caps, found on some of the larger Arctic islands (especially Baffin, Devon and Ellesmere) at sites having a relatively high elevation. Nunavut's vegetation is partially composed of rare berries, lichens, Arctic willows, mosses, tough grass, dwarf shrubs, graminoids, and herbs.

== Climate and climate data ==
Köppen climate types in Nunavut

Nunavut experiences a polar climate in most regions, owing to its high latitude and lower continental summertime influence than areas to the west. In more southerly continental areas, very cold subarctic climates can be found, due to July being slightly milder than the required 10 °C (50 °F).

Average daily maximum and minimum temperatures for selected locations in Nunavut
City	July (°C)		July (°F)		January (°C)		January (°F)	
	High	Low	High	Low	High	Low	High	Low
Alert	7	1	44	34	−27	−34	−17	−30
Baker Lake	18	7	64	44	−27	−34	−17	−29
Cambridge Bay	13	5	56	42	−28	−35	−18	−30
Eureka	10	4	50	38	−32	−40	−26	−39
Iqaluit	12	4	54	40	−22	−30	−8	−22
Kugluktuk	16	7	60	44	−23	−31	−9	−23
Rankin Inlet	15	7	59	44	−27	−34	−16	−28

Climate data for Alert (Alert Airport) Climate ID: 2400300; coordinates 82°31′04″N 62°16′50″W; elevation: 30.5 m (100 ft); 1991–2020 normals, extremes 1950–present (Note: Climate data 1991–2020 is a composite recorded at Alert Upper Air, Alert Climate (WMO ID: 71082 / 71355; Climate ID: 2400306 / 2400305; coordinates 82°30′N 62°20′W; elevation: 65.4 m (215 ft)), and Alert (Climate ID: 2400300; coordinates 82°31′04″N 62°16′50″W; elevation: 30.5 m (100 ft)))
Month	Jan	Feb	Mar	Apr	May	Jun	Jul	Aug	Sep	Oct	Nov	Dec	Year
Record high humidex	0.0	0.0	−2.4	−1.1	8.1	18.6	20.2	23.8	8.4	4.6	−1.1	1.4	23.8
Record high °C (°F)	0.0 (32.0)	1.1 (34.0)	−2.2 (28.0)	2.4 (36.3)	10.0 (50.0)	18.8 (65.8)	21.0 (69.8)	19.5 (67.1)	11.2 (52.2)	5.3 (41.5)	0.6 (33.1)	3.2 (37.8)	21.0 (69.8)
Mean daily maximum °C (°F)	−27.0 (−16.6)	−27.6 (−17.7)	−27.1 (−16.8)	−19.4 (−2.9)	−8.2 (17.2)	2.4 (36.3)	6.8 (44.2)	3.8 (38.8)	−5.1 (22.8)	−13.6 (7.5)	−20.4 (−4.7)	−24.3 (−11.7)	−13.3 (8.1)
Daily mean °C (°F)	−30.7 (−23.3)	−31.4 (−24.5)	−31.0 (−23.8)	−23.3 (−9.9)	−11.1 (12.0)	0.1 (32.2)	3.9 (39.0)	1.2 (34.2)	−8.0 (17.6)	−17.2 (1.0)	−24.1 (−11.4)	−28.1 (−18.6)	−16.7 (1.9)
Mean daily minimum °C (°F)	−34.4 (−29.9)	−35.2 (−31.4)	−34.9 (−30.8)	−27.0 (−16.6)	−14.0 (6.8)	−2.3 (27.9)	1.0 (33.8)	−1.4 (29.5)	−10.9 (12.4)	−20.7 (−5.3)	−27.8 (−18.0)	−31.9 (−25.4)	−20.0 (−4.0)
Record low °C (°F)	−48.9 (−56.0)	−50.0 (−58.0)	−49.4 (−56.9)	−45.6 (−50.1)	−29.0 (−20.2)	−14.3 (6.3)	−6.3 (20.7)	−15.0 (5.0)	−28.2 (−18.8)	−39.4 (−38.9)	−43.5 (−46.3)	−46.1 (−51.0)	−50.0 (−58.0)
Record low wind chill	−64.7	−60.5	−59.5	−56.8	−40.8	−21.1	−10.3	−19.2	−36.9	−49.4	−53.7	−57.3	−64.7
Average precipitation mm (inches)	10.5 (0.41)	7.3 (0.29)	10.3 (0.41)	11.5 (0.45)	11.6 (0.46)	11.1 (0.44)	21.5 (0.85)	18.4 (0.72)	17.8 (0.70)	12.1 (0.48)	11.5 (0.45)	8.5 (0.33)	152.0 (5.98)
Average rainfall mm (inches)	0.0 (0.0)	0.0 (0.0)	0.0 (0.0)	0.0 (0.0)	0.0 (0.0)	2.3 (0.09)	10.8 (0.43)	5.3 (0.21)	0.2 (0.01)	0.0 (0.0)	0.0 (0.0)	0.0 (0.0)	18.5 (0.73)
Average snowfall cm (inches)	12.7 (5.0)	9.6 (3.8)	12.2 (4.8)	13.2 (5.2)	17.1 (6.7)	11.1 (4.4)	12.8 (5.0)	15.9 (6.3)	30.5 (12.0)	25.5 (10.0)	18.3 (7.2)	13.0 (5.1)	191.7 (75.5)
Average precipitation days (≥ 0.2 mm)	12.4	8.8	11.5	10.1	9.0	7.6	9.6	10.0	11.2	12.3	10.6	10.9	124.1
Average rainy days (≥ 0.2 mm)	0.0	0.0	0.0	0.0	0.1	1.7	5.7	3.4	0.5	0.0	0.0	0.0	11.3
Average snowy days (≥ 0.2 cm)	11.6	9.7	10.2	8.7	9.4	5.4	4.1	6.8	11.5	13.0	10.7	11.1	112.2
Average relative humidity (%) (at 1500 LST)	70.8	70.4	70.1	72.4	81.3	84.5	81.7	84.4	85.3	79.3	73.6	71.8	77.1
Mean monthly sunshine hours	0.0	0.0	110.4	323.6	428.6	333.0	321.6	269.1	111.4	3.9	0.0	0.0	1,901.6
Percentage possible sunshine	—	—	33.1	46.8	57.6	46.3	43.2	36.2	21.9	4.1	—	—	36.1
Source: Environment and Climate Change Canada (sun 1981–2010) (April maximum)

Climate data for Baker Lake (Baker Lake Airport) WMO ID: 71926; coordinates 64°17′56″N 96°04′40″W; elevation: 18.6 m (61 ft); 1991–2020 normals, extremes 1946–present
Month	Jan	Feb	Mar	Apr	May	Jun	Jul	Aug	Sep	Oct	Nov	Dec	Year
Record high humidex	−2.0	−2.7	1.2	4.1	15.2	33.1	37.8	33.4	26.1	13.5	1.7	1.0	37.8
Record high °C (°F)	−1.7 (28.9)	−2.6 (27.3)	1.5 (34.7)	5.0 (41.0)	16.2 (61.2)	30.9 (87.6)	33.6 (92.5)	30.9 (87.6)	24.2 (75.6)	13.5 (56.3)	2.2 (36.0)	1.1 (34.0)	33.6 (92.5)
Mean daily maximum °C (°F)	−27.0 (−16.6)	−27.1 (−16.8)	−21.8 (−7.2)	−12.5 (9.5)	−2.6 (27.3)	10.0 (50.0)	17.5 (63.5)	15.0 (59.0)	6.8 (44.2)	−3.1 (26.4)	−14.6 (5.7)	−22.2 (−8.0)	−6.8 (19.8)
Daily mean °C (°F)	−30.5 (−22.9)	−30.7 (−23.3)	−26.1 (−15.0)	−17.0 (1.4)	−6.0 (21.2)	5.5 (41.9)	12.1 (53.8)	10.4 (50.7)	3.4 (38.1)	−6.1 (21.0)	−18.4 (−1.1)	−25.9 (−14.6)	−10.8 (12.6)
Mean daily minimum °C (°F)	−34.0 (−29.2)	−34.2 (−29.6)	−30.3 (−22.5)	−21.5 (−6.7)	−9.4 (15.1)	1.0 (33.8)	6.7 (44.1)	5.9 (42.6)	0.1 (32.2)	−9.0 (15.8)	−22.1 (−7.8)	−29.5 (−21.1)	−14.7 (5.5)
Record low °C (°F)	−50.6 (−59.1)	−50.0 (−58.0)	−50.0 (−58.0)	−41.1 (−42.0)	−27.8 (−18.0)	−13.9 (7.0)	−1.7 (28.9)	−3.4 (25.9)	−14.4 (6.1)	−30.6 (−23.1)	−42.7 (−44.9)	−45.6 (−50.1)	−50.6 (−59.1)
Record low wind chill	−71.5	−70.5	−66.1	−58.5	−42.3	−23.5	−5.8	−10.2	−23.0	−46.9	−59.2	−64.0	−71.5
Average precipitation mm (inches)	7.3 (0.29)	6.0 (0.24)	10.8 (0.43)	12.5 (0.49)	16.0 (0.63)	21.5 (0.85)	35.8 (1.41)	48.5 (1.91)	47.0 (1.85)	25.1 (0.99)	15.6 (0.61)	11.7 (0.46)	257.9 (10.15)
Average rainfall mm (inches)	0.0 (0.0)	0.0 (0.0)	0.0 (0.0)	0.1 (0.00)	3.9 (0.15)	18.7 (0.74)	37.3 (1.47)	47.6 (1.87)	39.3 (1.55)	5.2 (0.20)	0.0 (0.0)	0.1 (0.00)	152.3 (6.00)
Average snowfall cm (inches)	6.8 (2.7)	7.8 (3.1)	10.8 (4.3)	14.0 (5.5)	12.7 (5.0)	1.8 (0.7)	0.0 (0.0)	0.0 (0.0)	7.1 (2.8)	21.4 (8.4)	18.9 (7.4)	12.0 (4.7)	113.3 (44.6)
Average precipitation days (≥ 0.2 mm)	7.4	5.8	8.2	6.6	7.2	8.0	8.6	11.6	11.5	12.8	10.3	9.1	107.1
Average rainy days (≥ 0.2 mm)	0.0	0.0	0.0	0.14	2.0	7.0	9.0	10.7	9.5	2.3	0.0	0.06	40.5
Average snowy days (≥ 0.2 cm)	5.6	5.5	6.8	7.0	5.9	1.3	0.0	0.04	3.2	10.8	10.3	7.4	63.9
Average relative humidity (%) (at 1500 LST)	66.7	65.5	68.8	76.2	80.6	65.5	57.1	63.5	72.4	83.6	76.1	69.7	70.5
Mean monthly sunshine hours	35.8	107.1	189.6	234.5	264.3	262.4	301.1	210.6	107.4	72.3	51	7.1	1,843.2
Source: Environment and Climate Change Canada (sunshine 1951–1980)

Climate data for Cambridge Bay (Cambridge Bay Airport) WMO ID: 71925; coordinates 69°06′29″N 105°08′18″W; elevation: 31.1 m (102 ft); 1991–2020 normals (Note: Climate data 1991–2020 is a composite also recorded at Cambridge Bay GSN; WMO ID: 71288; coordinates 69°06′29″N 105°08′18″W; elevation: 18.7 m (61 ft) and Cambridge Bay Airport at WMO ID: 71925; coordinates 69°06′29″N 105°08′14″W; elevation: 31.1 m (102 ft))
Month	Jan	Feb	Mar	Apr	May	Jun	Jul	Aug	Sep	Oct	Nov	Dec	Year
Record high humidex	−5.0	−9.7	−4.1	3.9	10.5	25.3	30.8	28.6	16.3	5.8	−0.6	−3.5	30.8
Record high °C (°F)	−4.9 (23.2)	−9.4 (15.1)	−4.0 (24.8)	6.1 (43.0)	11.5 (52.7)	23.3 (73.9)	28.9 (84.0)	26.1 (79.0)	16.4 (61.5)	6.9 (44.4)	0.0 (32.0)	−3.4 (25.9)	28.9 (84.0)
Mean daily maximum °C (°F)	−27.7 (−17.9)	−28.6 (−19.5)	−24.9 (−12.8)	−16.2 (2.8)	−5.2 (22.6)	6.0 (42.8)	13.3 (55.9)	10.3 (50.5)	2.6 (36.7)	−6.6 (20.1)	−17.5 (0.5)	−24.3 (−11.7)	−9.9 (14.2)
Daily mean °C (°F)	−31.2 (−24.2)	−32.1 (−25.8)	−28.8 (−19.8)	−20.7 (−5.3)	−8.9 (16.0)	3.0 (37.4)	9.4 (48.9)	7.4 (45.3)	0.5 (32.9)	−9.5 (14.9)	−21.1 (−6.0)	−27.8 (−18.0)	−13.3 (8.1)
Mean daily minimum °C (°F)	−34.6 (−30.3)	−35.6 (−32.1)	−32.7 (−26.9)	−25.1 (−13.2)	−12.6 (9.3)	0.0 (32.0)	5.4 (41.7)	4.3 (39.7)	−1.7 (28.9)	−12.3 (9.9)	−24.7 (−12.5)	−31.3 (−24.3)	−16.7 (1.9)
Record low °C (°F)	−52.8 (−63.0)	−50.6 (−59.1)	−48.3 (−54.9)	−42.8 (−45.0)	−35.0 (−31.0)	−17.8 (0.0)	−8.2 (17.2)	−8.9 (16.0)	−17.2 (1.0)	−33.0 (−27.4)	−43.9 (−47.0)	−49.4 (−56.9)	−52.8 (−63.0)
Record low wind chill	−73.4	−72.6	−69.8	−60.1	−43.2	−29.2	−7.9	−18.1	−28.6	−49.4	−60.7	−66.3	−73.4
Average precipitation mm (inches)	5.6 (0.22)	5.9 (0.23)	9.2 (0.36)	6.9 (0.27)	6.7 (0.26)	16.4 (0.65)	28.0 (1.10)	23.5 (0.93)	18.4 (0.72)	14.8 (0.58)	8.9 (0.35)	6.2 (0.24)	150.4 (5.92)
Average rainfall mm (inches)	0.0 (0.0)	0.0 (0.0)	0.0 (0.0)	0.0 (0.0)	0.8 (0.03)	11.4 (0.45)	28.0 (1.10)	22.4 (0.88)	13.2 (0.52)	0.9 (0.04)	0.0 (0.0)	0.0 (0.0)	76.7 (3.02)
Average snowfall cm (inches)	6.3 (2.5)	5.5 (2.2)	8.1 (3.2)	7.5 (3.0)	6.4 (2.5)	3.4 (1.3)	0.2 (0.1)	1.8 (0.7)	5.4 (2.1)	16.6 (6.5)	10.9 (4.3)	7.4 (2.9)	79.4 (31.3)
Average precipitation days (≥ 0.2 mm)	8.4	7.5	11.7	7.9	6.9	9.4	11.1	12.3	12.0	13.8	10.8	8.6	120.5
Average rainy days (≥ 0.2 mm)	0.0	0.0	0.0	0.0	0.8	6.5	10.4	11.8	6.8	0.83	0.0	0.0	37.2
Average snowy days (≥ 0.2 cm)	8.0	6.2	10.0	7.5	6.2	3.5	0.2	0.8	5.7	13.1	10.2	8.4	79.9
Average relative humidity (%) (at 1500 LST)	66.4	66.4	68.7	73.9	82.8	78.0	68.0	73.4	82.2	86.2	75.8	68.6	74.2
Source: Environment and Climate Change Canada

Climate data for Eureka (Eureka Aerodrome) WMO ID: 71917; coordinates 79°59′N 85°56′W; elevation: 10.4 m (34 ft); 1991–2020 normals, extremes 1947–present
Month	Jan	Feb	Mar	Apr	May	Jun	Jul	Aug	Sep	Oct	Nov	Dec	Year
Record high humidex	−1.1	−1.1	−8.5	−3.0	7.3	17.9	20.8	17.4	7.2	4.8	−3.9	−4.0	20.8
Record high °C (°F)	−1.1 (30.0)	−1.1 (30.0)	−8.0 (17.6)	−2.8 (27.0)	7.5 (45.5)	18.5 (65.3)	20.9 (69.6)	17.6 (63.7)	9.3 (48.7)	5.0 (41.0)	−1.7 (28.9)	−2.1 (28.2)	20.9 (69.6)
Mean daily maximum °C (°F)	−32.3 (−26.1)	−33.0 (−27.4)	−32.3 (−26.1)	−21.9 (−7.4)	−6.7 (19.9)	5.8 (42.4)	10.1 (50.2)	5.7 (42.3)	−3.3 (26.1)	−15.9 (3.4)	−24.3 (−11.7)	−29.2 (−20.6)	−14.8 (5.4)
Daily mean °C (°F)	−35.9 (−32.6)	−36.8 (−34.2)	−35.9 (−32.6)	−25.9 (−14.6)	−9.9 (14.2)	3.1 (37.6)	6.8 (44.2)	3.4 (38.1)	−5.8 (21.6)	−19.5 (−3.1)	−28.0 (−18.4)	−32.8 (−27.0)	−18.1 (−0.6)
Mean daily minimum °C (°F)	−39.5 (−39.1)	−40.5 (−40.9)	−39.4 (−38.9)	−29.8 (−21.6)	−13.1 (8.4)	0.5 (32.9)	3.5 (38.3)	1.2 (34.2)	−8.2 (17.2)	−23.1 (−9.6)	−31.6 (−24.9)	−36.3 (−33.3)	−21.4 (−6.5)
Record low °C (°F)	−53.3 (−63.9)	−55.3 (−67.5)	−52.8 (−63.0)	−48.9 (−56.0)	−31.1 (−24.0)	−13.9 (7.0)	−2.2 (28.0)	−12.9 (8.8)	−31.7 (−25.1)	−41.7 (−43.1)	−48.2 (−54.8)	−51.7 (−61.1)	−55.3 (−67.5)
Record low wind chill	−72.1	−69.5	−66.9	−59.3	−43.2	−20.7	−7.0	−17.4	−40.3	−52.1	−61.3	−66.3	−72.1
Average precipitation mm (inches)	2.6 (0.10)	2.6 (0.10)	2.6 (0.10)	3.6 (0.14)	3.3 (0.13)	8.6 (0.34)	14.4 (0.57)	17.9 (0.70)	8.2 (0.32)	6.6 (0.26)	3.7 (0.15)	3.5 (0.14)	77.6 (3.06)
Average rainfall mm (inches)	0.0 (0.0)	0.0 (0.0)	0.0 (0.0)	0.0 (0.0)	0.0 (0.0)	6.1 (0.24)	14.0 (0.55)	13.1 (0.52)	0.3 (0.01)	0.0 (0.0)	0.0 (0.0)	0.0 (0.0)	33.5 (1.32)
Average snowfall cm (inches)	3.7 (1.5)	3.9 (1.5)	4.0 (1.6)	4.4 (1.7)	4.7 (1.9)	2.8 (1.1)	1.0 (0.4)	5.5 (2.2)	11.3 (4.4)	10.1 (4.0)	5.6 (2.2)	5.5 (2.2)	62.5 (24.6)
Average precipitation days (≥ 0.2 mm)	4.4	4.4	5.3	4.9	3.9	5.2	7.8	7.9	6.8	8.6	5.9	5.4	70.6
Average rainy days (≥ 0.2 mm)	0.0	0.0	0.0	0.0	0.0	3.5	7.7	6.0	0.16	0.0	0.0	0.0	17.4
Average snowy days (≥ 0.2 cm)	4.5	4.8	5.2	4.8	4.0	2.3	0.79	2.8	7.1	9.0	6.2	5.2	56.8
Average relative humidity (%) (at 1500 LST)	64.5	66.5	66.2	64.9	71.9	70.3	67.4	75.7	81.7	75.0	66.9	66.5	69.8
Mean monthly sunshine hours	0.0	0.0	118	355.1	520.7	405	341.2	240.1	101.8	8.6	0.0	0.0	2,090.5
Source: Environment and Climate Change Canada (sun 1951–1980)

Climate data for Iqaluit (Iqaluit Airport) WMO ID: 71909; coordinates 63°45′N 68°33′W; elevation: 33.5 m (110 ft); 1991–2020 normals, extremes 1946–present
Month	Jan	Feb	Mar	Apr	May	Jun	Jul	Aug	Sep	Oct	Nov	Dec	Year
Record high humidex	3.3	5.2	4.3	6.8	13.3	21.7	27.8	27.6	18.8	8.6	4.8	3.4	27.8
Record high °C (°F)	3.9 (39.0)	5.7 (42.3)	4.2 (39.6)	7.2 (45.0)	13.3 (55.9)	22.7 (72.9)	26.8 (80.2)	25.5 (77.9)	18.4 (65.1)	9.1 (48.4)	5.6 (42.1)	3.8 (38.8)	26.8 (80.2)
Mean daily maximum °C (°F)	−22.0 (−7.6)	−22.9 (−9.2)	−17.6 (0.3)	−8.9 (16.0)	−0.3 (31.5)	7.0 (44.6)	12.0 (53.6)	11.1 (52.0)	5.6 (42.1)	−0.5 (31.1)	−7.5 (18.5)	−14.7 (5.5)	−4.9 (23.2)
Daily mean °C (°F)	−26.0 (−14.8)	−27.0 (−16.6)	−22.4 (−8.3)	−13.5 (7.7)	−3.2 (26.2)	3.9 (39.0)	8.1 (46.6)	7.5 (45.5)	2.9 (37.2)	−3.2 (26.2)	−11.1 (12.0)	−18.9 (−2.0)	−8.6 (16.5)
Mean daily minimum °C (°F)	−29.9 (−21.8)	−31.0 (−23.8)	−27.2 (−17.0)	−18.1 (−0.6)	−6.1 (21.0)	0.7 (33.3)	4.2 (39.6)	3.8 (38.8)	0.2 (32.4)	−5.8 (21.6)	−14.7 (5.5)	−23.0 (−9.4)	−12.2 (10.0)
Record low °C (°F)	−45.0 (−49.0)	−49.0 (−56.2)	−44.7 (−48.5)	−34.2 (−29.6)	−26.1 (−15.0)	−10.2 (13.6)	−2.8 (27.0)	−2.5 (27.5)	−12.8 (9.0)	−27.1 (−16.8)	−36.2 (−33.2)	−43.4 (−46.1)	−45.6 (−50.1)
Record low wind chill	−65.5	−66.4	−62.1	−53.1	−36.0	−18.8	−7.2	−8.6	−18.6	−42.9	−56.8	−60.1	−66.4
Average precipitation mm (inches)	16.3 (0.64)	14.0 (0.55)	21.4 (0.84)	22.7 (0.89)	21.0 (0.83)	48.7 (1.92)	39.8 (1.57)	61.7 (2.43)	50.8 (2.00)	30.2 (1.19)	18.5 (0.73)	16.2 (0.64)	361.2 (14.22)
Average rainfall mm (inches)	0.4 (0.02)	0.1 (0.00)	0.0 (0.0)	0.0 (0.0)	3.3 (0.13)	46.1 (1.81)	44.4 (1.75)	65.5 (2.58)	43.9 (1.73)	12.3 (0.48)	0.7 (0.03)	0.0 (0.0)	216.6 (8.53)
Average snowfall cm (inches)	19.4 (7.6)	15.1 (5.9)	20.6 (8.1)	23.8 (9.4)	23.0 (9.1)	3.8 (1.5)	0.0 (0.0)	0.1 (0.0)	8.5 (3.3)	21.1 (8.3)	25.9 (10.2)	28.8 (11.3)	190.0 (74.8)
Average precipitation days (≥ 0.2 mm)	12.1	10.7	12.4	12.8	10.6	12.3	12.4	14.3	15.7	13.2	12.5	12.8	151.5
Average rainy days (≥ 0.2 mm)	0.06	0.06	0.06	0.06	1.7	10.7	13.1	14.8	13.2	3.8	0.24	0.0	57.7
Average snowy days (≥ 0.2 cm)	10.1	8.8	8.7	9.6	8.7	2.1	0.06	0.12	3.7	9.8	11.9	12.7	86.3
Average relative humidity (%) (at 1500 LST)	68.1	67.6	68.9	74.6	77.3	74.6	72.9	73.5	75.2	78.7	78.4	74.3	73.7
Mean monthly sunshine hours	32.4	94.0	172.2	216.5	180.5	200.2	236.8	156.8	87.9	51.4	35.6	12.6	1,476.8
Percentage possible sunshine	18.5	39.0	47.4	48.2	31.9	32.5	39.3	31.0	22.4	16.8	17.7	8.9	29.5
Average ultraviolet index	0	0	1	2	4	4	4	3	2	1	0	0	2
Source: Environment and Climate Change Canada (sunshine 1981–2010 from ECCC) (ultraviolet index from Weather Atlas)

Climate data for Kugluktuk (Kugluktuk Airport) WMO ID: 71938; coordinates 67°49′00″N 115°08′38″W; elevation: 22.6 m (74 ft); 1991–2020 normals, extremes 1930–present (Note: Climate data was recorded at Coppermine from October 1930 to November 1977 and at Kugluktuk Airport from December 1977 to present.)
Month	Jan	Feb	Mar	Apr	May	Jun	Jul	Aug	Sep	Oct	Nov	Dec	Year
Record high humidex	0.3	−1.7	−0.3	8.9	19.8	30.3	36.8	36.8	25.8	13.1	2.2	−1.5	36.8
Record high °C (°F)	0.8 (33.4)	1.1 (34.0)	−0.1 (31.8)	9.8 (49.6)	23.3 (73.9)	32.5 (90.5)	34.9 (94.8)	30.3 (86.5)	26.1 (79.0)	13.9 (57.0)	4.4 (39.9)	4.4 (39.9)	34.9 (94.8)
Mean daily maximum °C (°F)	−22.5 (−8.5)	−22.8 (−9.0)	−20.1 (−4.2)	−11.6 (11.1)	−0.6 (30.9)	10.4 (50.7)	15.8 (60.4)	13.7 (56.7)	6.8 (44.2)	−2.9 (26.8)	−13.2 (8.2)	−20.1 (−4.2)	−5.6 (21.9)
Daily mean °C (°F)	−26.6 (−15.9)	−27.0 (−16.6)	−24.6 (−12.3)	−16.4 (2.5)	−4.5 (23.9)	5.9 (42.6)	11.2 (52.2)	9.6 (49.3)	3.6 (38.5)	−5.9 (21.4)	−17.1 (1.2)	−24.1 (−11.4)	−9.7 (14.5)
Mean daily minimum °C (°F)	−30.7 (−23.3)	−31.3 (−24.3)	−29.1 (−20.4)	−21.2 (−6.2)	−8.5 (16.7)	1.4 (34.5)	6.5 (43.7)	5.4 (41.7)	0.3 (32.5)	−9.0 (15.8)	−21.0 (−5.8)	−28.1 (−18.6)	−13.8 (7.2)
Record low °C (°F)	−47.8 (−54.0)	−50.0 (−58.0)	−48.9 (−56.0)	−43.9 (−47.0)	−31.1 (−24.0)	−15.0 (5.0)	−0.8 (30.6)	−4.4 (24.1)	−20.0 (−4.0)	−35.4 (−31.7)	−41.1 (−42.0)	−45.0 (−49.0)	−50.0 (−58.0)
Record low wind chill	−64.3	−64.4	−65.0	−54.4	−39.7	−15.6	−5.9	−11.8	−22.9	−46.5	−54.1	−61.5	−65.0
Average precipitation mm (inches)	9.2 (0.36)	7.0 (0.28)	9.3 (0.37)	7.9 (0.31)	14.5 (0.57)	17.4 (0.69)	45.2 (1.78)	42.3 (1.67)	35.5 (1.40)	23.3 (0.92)	10.9 (0.43)	10.6 (0.42)	233.1 (9.18)
Average rainfall mm (inches)	0.1 (0.00)	0.0 (0.0)	0.0 (0.0)	0.1 (0.00)	4.3 (0.17)	14.6 (0.57)	44.4 (1.75)	44.9 (1.77)	31.4 (1.24)	4.7 (0.19)	0.0 (0.0)	0.0 (0.0)	144.5 (5.69)
Average snowfall cm (inches)	19.6 (7.7)	16.3 (6.4)	19.4 (7.6)	18.2 (7.2)	16.2 (6.4)	2.1 (0.8)	0.0 (0.0)	0.2 (0.1)	7.7 (3.0)	35.0 (13.8)	25.5 (10.0)	21.9 (8.6)	182.1 (71.7)
Average precipitation days (≥ 0.2 mm)	9.7	8.7	10.1	7.7	8.5	8.3	11.8	13.0	13.0	14.5	10.6	10.3	126.2
Average rainy days (≥ 0.2 mm)	0.0	0.0	0.0	0.2	1.9	6.8	11.5	13.1	10.5	2.3	0.0	0.0	46.4
Average snowy days (≥ 0.2 cm)	10.5	10.1	11.6	9.5	7.2	1.3	0.1	0.2	3.7	14.5	13.4	11.6	93.6
Average relative humidity (%) (at 1500 LST)	76.7	75.1	77.5	82.3	83.1	70.2	64.8	69.8	75.5	84.7	80.9	77.8	76.5
Average dew point °C (°F)	−30.6 (−23.1)	−31.3 (−24.3)	−30.2 (−22.4)	−20.8 (−5.4)	−7.5 (18.5)	0.8 (33.4)	5.5 (41.9)	4.6 (40.3)	−0.3 (31.5)	−8.3 (17.1)	−21.5 (−6.7)	−29.7 (−21.5)	−14.1 (6.6)
Mean monthly sunshine hours	17.8	77.3	160.3	233.3	246.7	375.0	341.6	207.7	91.1	51.2	19.6	0.2	1,821.7
Percentage possible sunshine	17.7	35.5	44.4	49.6	38.7	52.1	48.5	38.5	22.8	17.6	12.7	0.7	31.6
Source: Environment and Climate Change Canada (rain/rain days, snow/snow days, humidex, wind chill, humidity 1981–2010) Canadian Climate Normals 1981–2010 (dew point 1951–1980)

Climate data for Rankin Inlet (Rankin Inlet Airport) WMO ID: 71083; coordinates 62°49′N 92°07′W; elevation: 32.3 m (106 ft); 1991–2020 normals, extremes 1981–present
Month	Jan	Feb	Mar	Apr	May	Jun	Jul	Aug	Sep	Oct	Nov	Dec	Year
Record high humidex	−3.0	−3.6	1.1	2.5	13.4	27.5	32.2	31.8	23.4	12.7	1.4	0.8	32.2
Record high °C (°F)	−2.5 (27.5)	−3.4 (25.9)	1.3 (34.3)	3.4 (38.1)	14.1 (57.4)	26.8 (80.2)	28.9 (84.0)	30.5 (86.9)	21.0 (69.8)	13.3 (55.9)	1.5 (34.7)	0.9 (33.6)	30.5 (86.9)
Mean daily maximum °C (°F)	−26.6 (−15.9)	−25.8 (−14.4)	−20.3 (−4.5)	−11.1 (12.0)	−2.2 (28.0)	8.4 (47.1)	15.2 (59.4)	13.5 (56.3)	6.7 (44.1)	−1.4 (29.5)	−12.5 (9.5)	−20.7 (−5.3)	−6.4 (20.5)
Daily mean °C (°F)	−30.1 (−22.2)	−29.5 (−21.1)	−24.5 (−12.1)	−15.5 (4.1)	−5.5 (22.1)	4.6 (40.3)	10.9 (51.6)	10.1 (50.2)	4.2 (39.6)	−4.6 (23.7)	−17.0 (1.4)	−25.7 (−14.3)	−10.0 (14.0)
Mean daily minimum °C (°F)	−33.6 (−28.5)	−33.2 (−27.8)	−28.8 (−19.8)	−19.9 (−3.8)	−8.7 (16.3)	0.8 (33.4)	6.6 (43.9)	6.7 (44.1)	1.6 (34.9)	−6.6 (20.1)	−20.3 (−4.5)	−28.2 (−18.8)	−13.6 (7.5)
Record low °C (°F)	−46.1 (−51.0)	−49.8 (−57.6)	−43.4 (−46.1)	−36.1 (−33.0)	−24.6 (−12.3)	−9.4 (15.1)	−1.9 (28.6)	−1.4 (29.5)	−9.0 (15.8)	−27.4 (−17.3)	−36.8 (−34.2)	−43.6 (−46.5)	−49.8 (−57.6)
Record low wind chill	−66.8	−70.5	−64.4	−53.6	−37.8	−17.6	−5.3	−8.8	−18.1	−42.7	−55.3	−62.4	−70.5
Average precipitation mm (inches)	9.6 (0.38)	9.2 (0.36)	12.3 (0.48)	20.6 (0.81)	21.0 (0.83)	22.1 (0.87)	43.7 (1.72)	51.6 (2.03)	47.3 (1.86)	40.1 (1.58)	22.5 (0.89)	16.1 (0.63)	315.9 (12.44)
Average rainfall mm (inches)	0.0 (0.0)	0.0 (0.0)	0.0 (0.0)	1.1 (0.04)	7.3 (0.29)	19.6 (0.77)	43.5 (1.71)	51.6 (2.03)	44.7 (1.76)	14.7 (0.58)	0.5 (0.02)	0.1 (0.00)	183.2 (7.21)
Average snowfall cm (inches)	9.8 (3.9)	9.2 (3.6)	12.3 (4.8)	20.0 (7.9)	14.0 (5.5)	2.2 (0.9)	0.1 (0.0)	0.0 (0.0)	2.6 (1.0)	25.4 (10.0)	22.5 (8.9)	16.5 (6.5)	134.5 (53.0)
Average precipitation days (≥ 0.2 mm)	7.5	6.7	8.5	8.0	8.6	7.1	10.5	12.6	12.7	14.9	12.9	10.8	120.8
Average rainy days (≥ 0.2 mm)	0.08	0.04	0.04	0.75	2.6	6.0	10.5	12.6	10.9	4.4	0.50	0.17	48.6
Average snowy days (≥ 0.2 cm)	7.6	6.8	8.5	7.7	6.9	1.5	0.04	0.04	2.7	12.3	12.9	10.8	77.8
Average relative humidity (%) (at 1500 LST)	68.2	68.7	71.9	78.1	81.0	70.6	65.7	71.2	74.6	84.2	79.2	72.4	73.8
Source: Environment and Climate Change Canada Canadian Climate Normals 1991–2020

== Demographics ==
As of the 2021 Canadian census, Nunavut had a population of 36,858. Of this 30,865 people identified as Inuit (84.3% of the total population), 180 as First Nations (0.5%), 120 as Métis (0.3%), 230 with multiple or other Indigenous responses (0.6%), and 5,210 as non-Indigenous (14.2%). Nunavut's small and sparse population makes it unlikely the territory will be granted provincial status in the foreseeable future, although this may change if the Yukon, which is only marginally more populous, becomes a province.

Most populous communities
Municipality	2021	2016	2011	Change 2011–2021	Refs.
Iqaluit	7,429	7,740	6,699	10.9%	
Rankin Inlet	2,975	2,842	2,557	16.2%	
Arviat	2,864	2,657	2,060	39.0%	
Baker Lake	2,061	2,069	1,728	19.3%	
Igloolik	2,049	1,744	1,538	33.2%	
Cambridge Bay	1,760	1,766	1,452	21.2%	
Pond Inlet	1,555	1,617	1,315	18.3%	
Pangnirtung	1,504	1,481	1,325	13.5%	
Kinngait	1,396	1,441	1,363	2.4%	
Kugluktuk	1,382	1,491	1,302	6.1%	

== Gallery ==
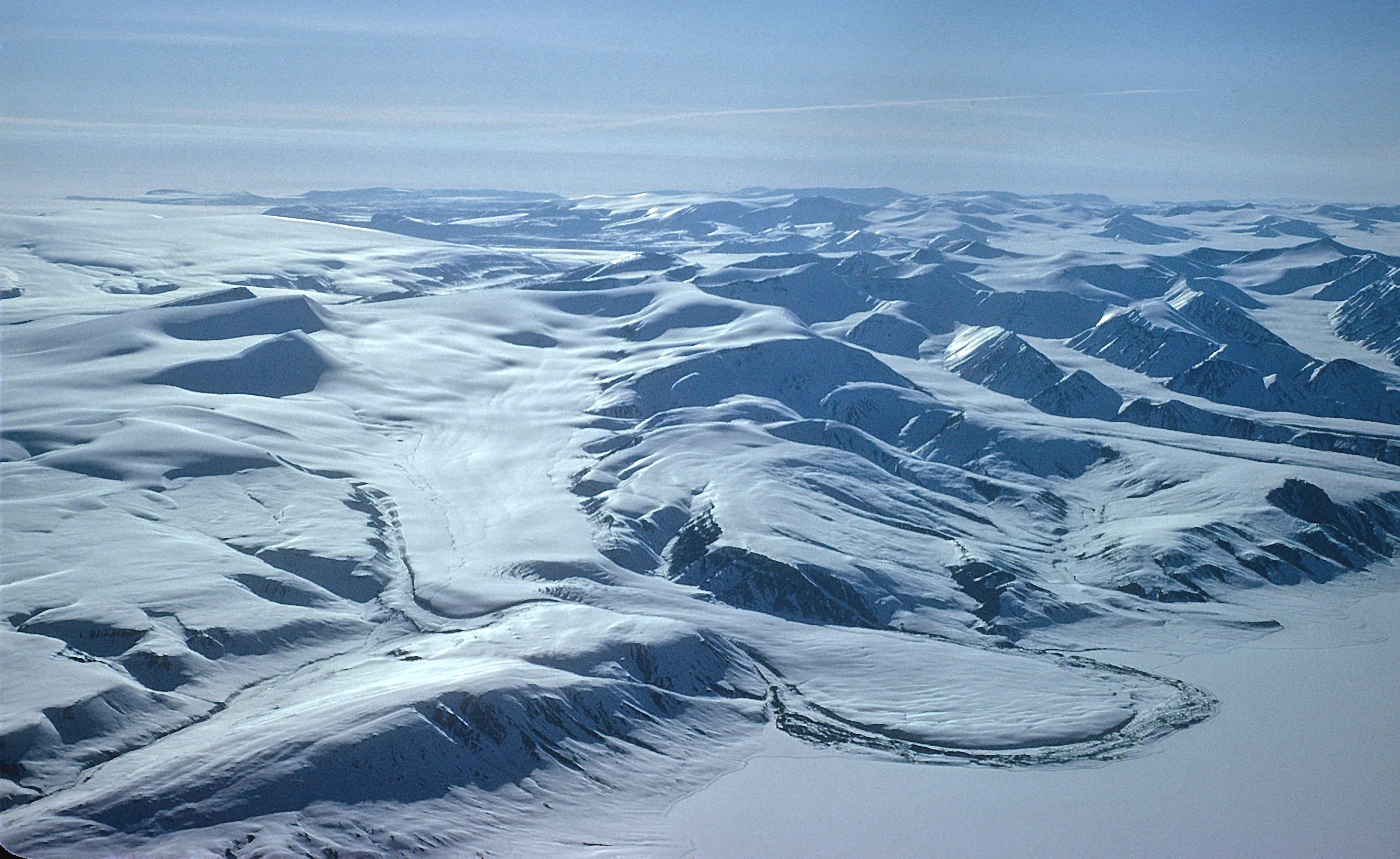
A glacier on southern
Axel Heiberg Island

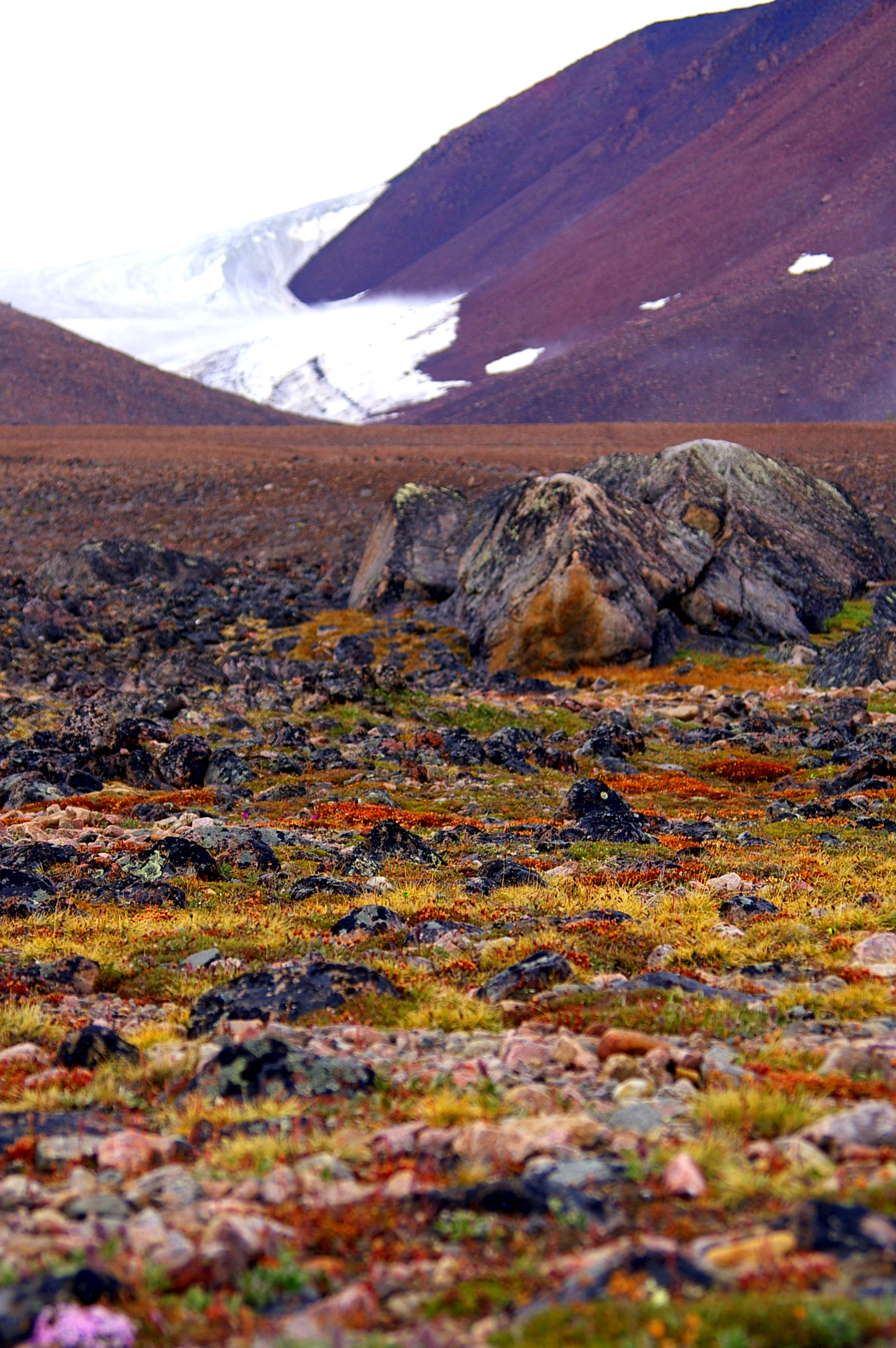
Flora near Grise Fiord

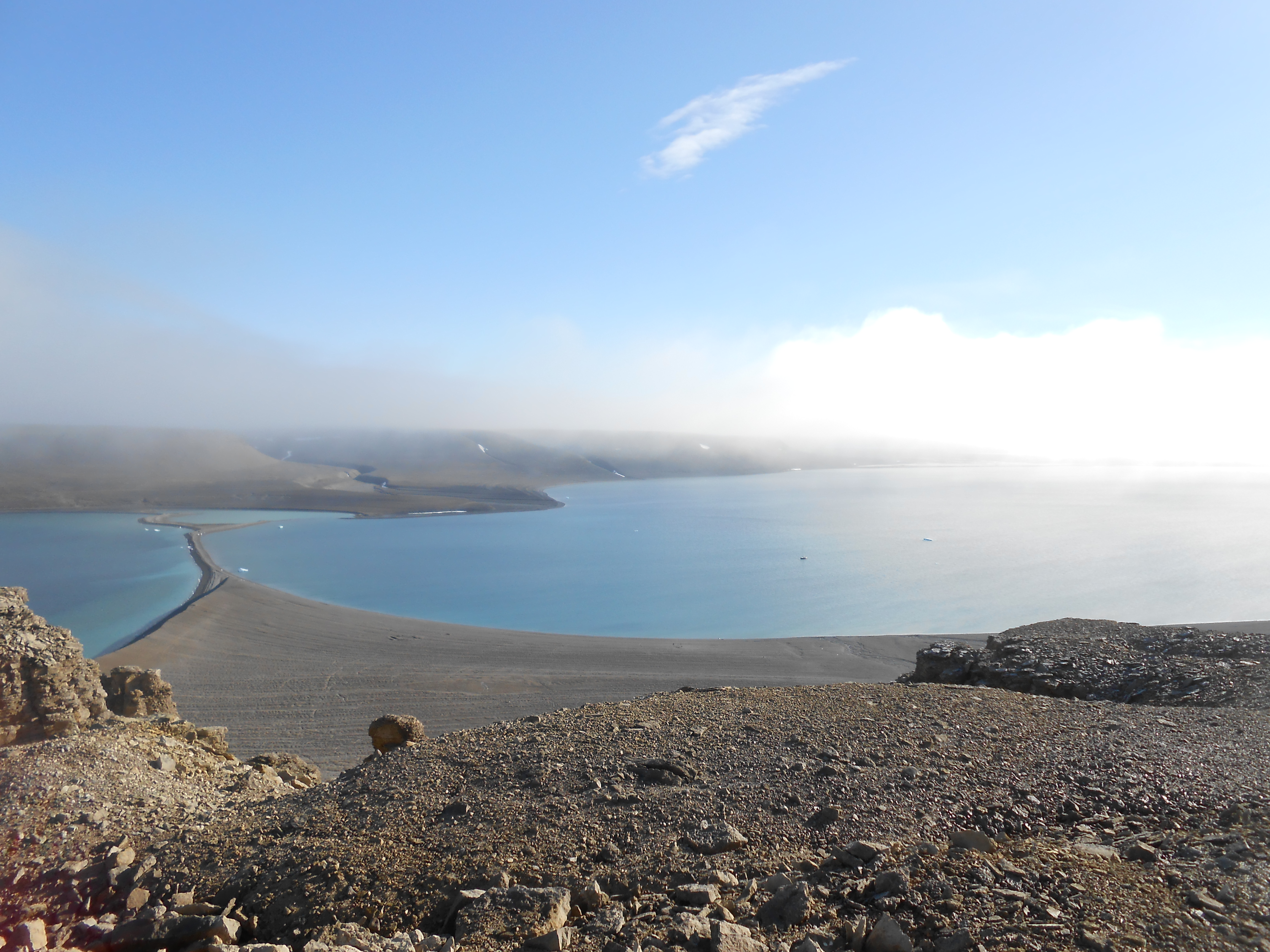
Beechey Island harbour

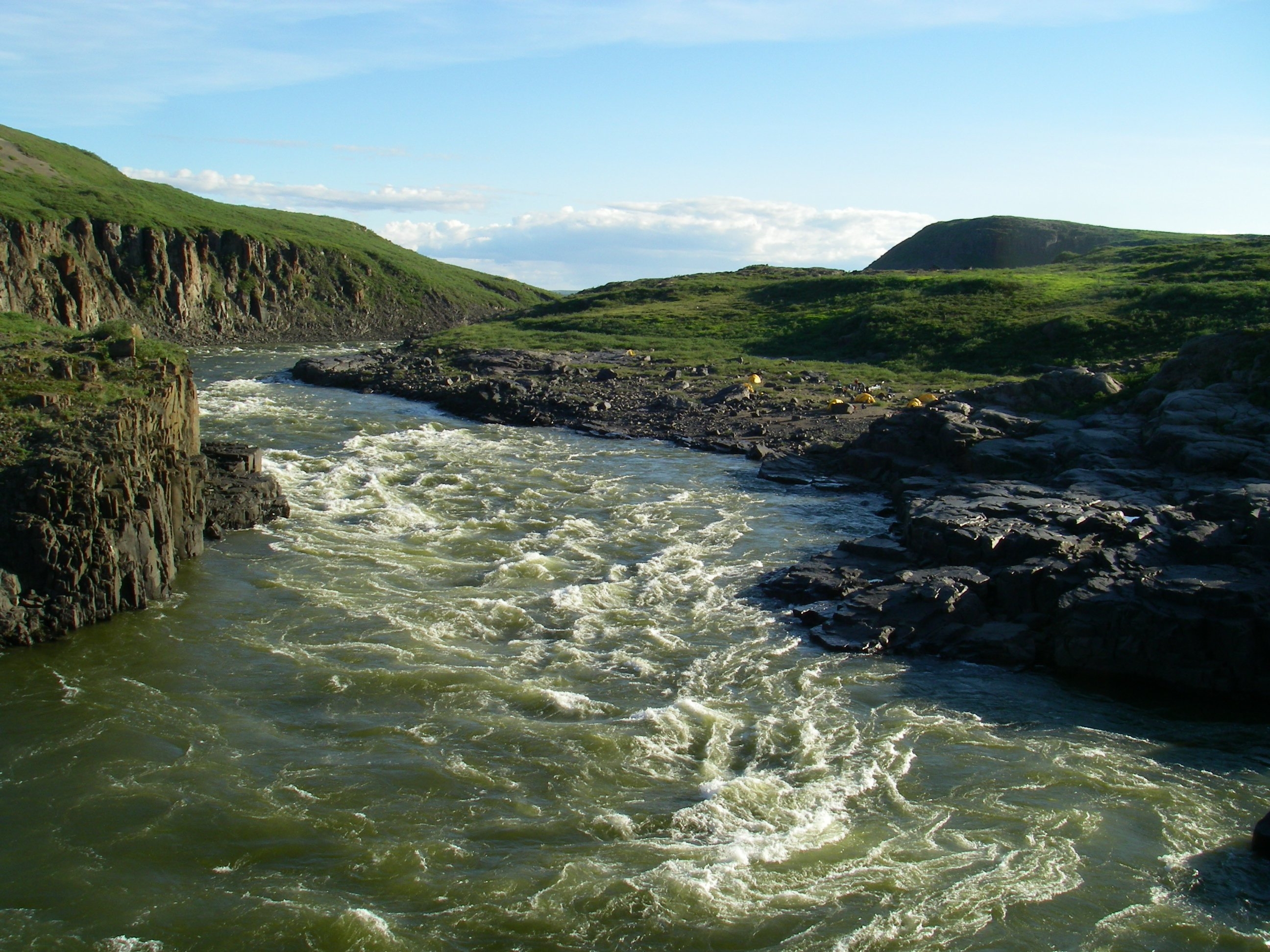
Rapids above Bloody Falls, Kugluk Territorial Park

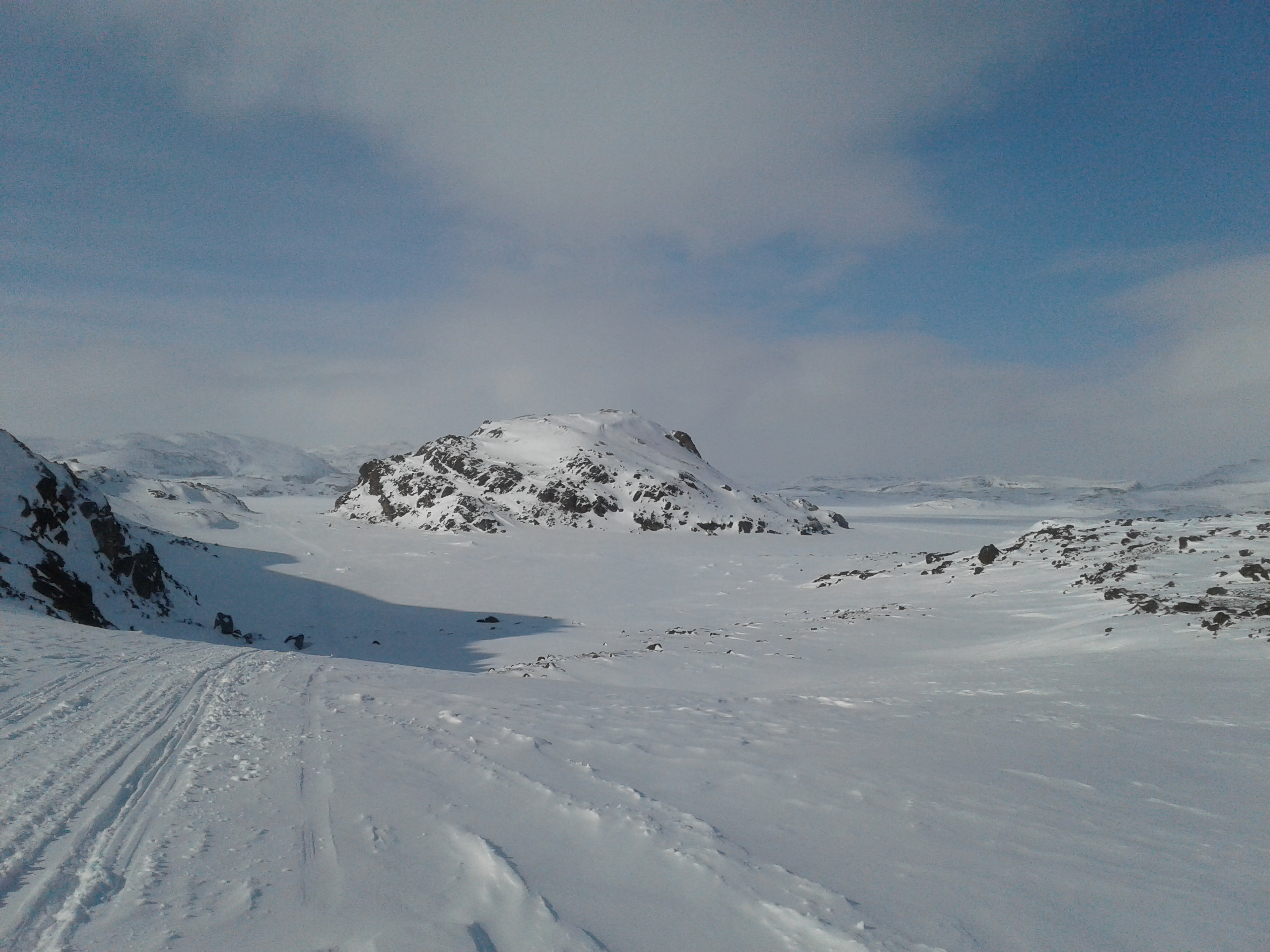
Katannilik Territorial Park Reserve

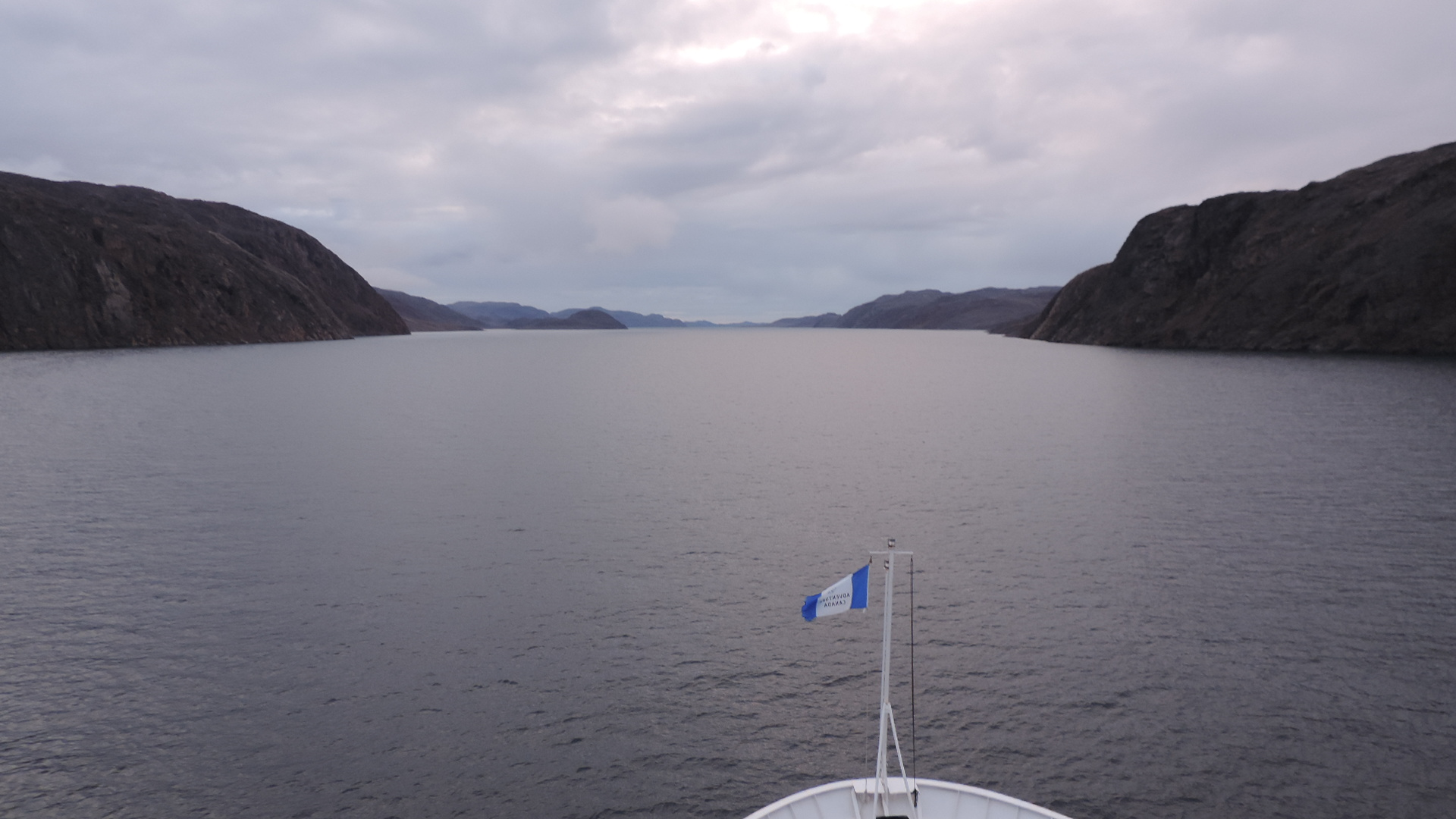
Bellot Strait, that separates Somerset Island from
Boothia Peninsula

== See also ==
- Geology of Nunavut
- List of lakes of Nunavut
