= Bexley (disambiguation) =

Bexley is an area of south-east London, England, sometimes known as Bexley Village.

Bexley may also refer to:

== Places ==
- London Borough of Bexley, in Greater London, England
  - Bexley (UK Parliament constituency)
  - Bexley (electoral division), Greater London Council
  - Municipal Borough of Bexley, 1935–1965
  - Bexley College, now part of London South East Colleges
  - Bexley Grammar School
  - Bexleyheath, a town
- Bexley, Ohio, a suburb of Columbus, Ohio, United States of America
  - Bexley High School
- Bexley, Mississippi, U.S.
- Bexley, New Zealand, a suburb of Christchurch, New Zealand
- Bexley, New South Wales, a suburb of Sydney, Australia
- Bexley Township, Ontario, Canada
- Cape Bexley, a headland in Nunavut, Canada

== Names ==
- Bexley (given name)
- Don Bexley (1910–1997), American actor and comedian

== See also ==
- Bexley Hall (disambiguation)
