= Kamut Lake =

Lake in Nunavut and the Northwest Territories, Canada

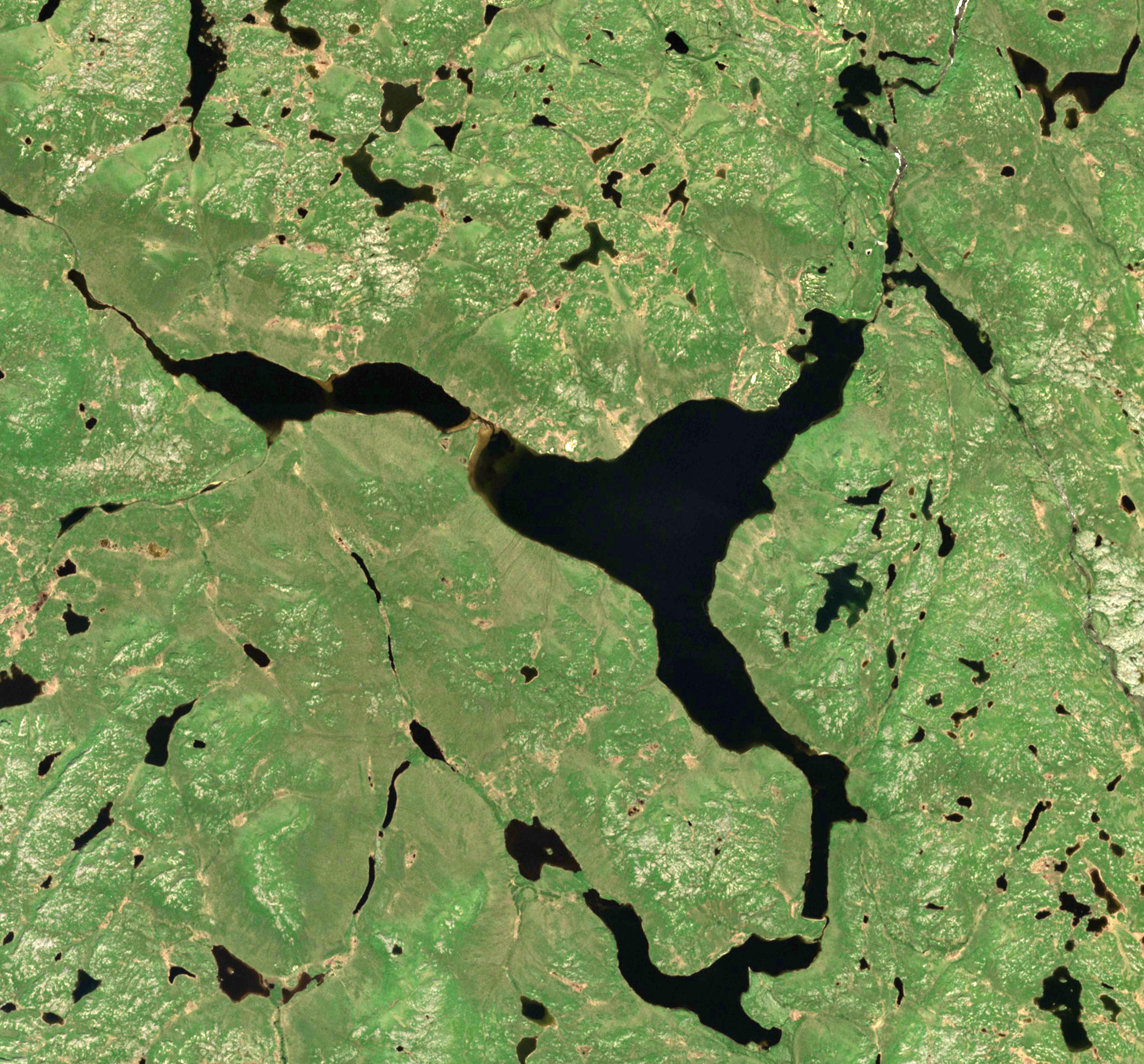
- Sentinel-2 image (2021)

- Location within Northwest Territories
- Location: Northwest Territories/ Nunavut
- Coordinates: 66.700°N 116.367°W
- Primary outflows: Coppermine River
- Catchment area: Coppermine River
- Basin countries: Canada
- Settlements: uninhabited

Kamut Lake is an irregularly shaped lake on the Canadian mainland, bordering the Northwest Territories and Nunavut. It is located east of Great Bear Lake, with the Coppermine River serving as its inflow and outflow.

There is an archaeological site at the northeastern end of the lake.
