= Bexley Hall (disambiguation) =

Bexley Hall was an Episcopal seminary that was created in association with Kenyon College in Gambier, Ohio, U.S.

Bexley Hall may also refer to:

- Bexley Hall Seabury Western Theological Seminary Federation (commonly known as Bexley Seabury), a seminary that was formed from the merger of Bexley Hall and Seabury-Western Theological Seminary
- Bexley Hall (MIT), a former undergraduate student residence at the Massachusetts Institute of Technology
- Hall Place, Bexley, London, a former stately home in Kent

== See also ==
- Bexley (disambiguation)
