= Bloody Falls massacre =

Alleged 1771 incident in Canada

Coordinates: 67°44′39″N 115°22′00″W

The Bloody Falls massacre took place during Hudson's Bay Company employee Samuel Hearne's exploration of the Coppermine River for copper deposits near modern-day Kugluktuk, Nunavut, Canada on 17 July 1771. Hearne's original travelogue is now lost, and the narrative that became famous was published after Hearne's death with substantial editorializing. The narrative states that Chipewyan and "Copper Indian" Dene men led by Hearne's guide and companion Matonabbee attacked a group of Copper Inuit camped by rapids approximately 15 km (9.3 mi) upstream from the mouth of the Coppermine River.

== Prelude ==
Towards the end of May 1771, Samuel Hearne began to notice that the Chipewyan Indians accompanying him on his expedition had motives other than his planned survey of the Coppermine River. On the party's arrival at Peshew Lake, Matonabbee and a number of the men accompanying Hearne began to make arrangements for their wives and children to be left behind. When the party arrived at Clowey Lake, each of the Chipewyan men crafted shields from thin boards, 60 cm (2 ft) wide and 90 cm (3 ft) long. Hearne noted that his party was joined by a number of Indians who were solely interested in propagating a war against the Inuit. In the travel narrative describing his journey, he claimed that as the group advanced north into Inuit territories, it became evident that his companions were gradually plotting an act of "savage", "shocking", and "brutish" violence. The Dene people of the area claim, however, that Hearne himself was not present at the event, while Hearne's contemporaries further questioned his claims. The oral history of the Inuit-Dene conflict also does not reflect the Bloody Falls story.

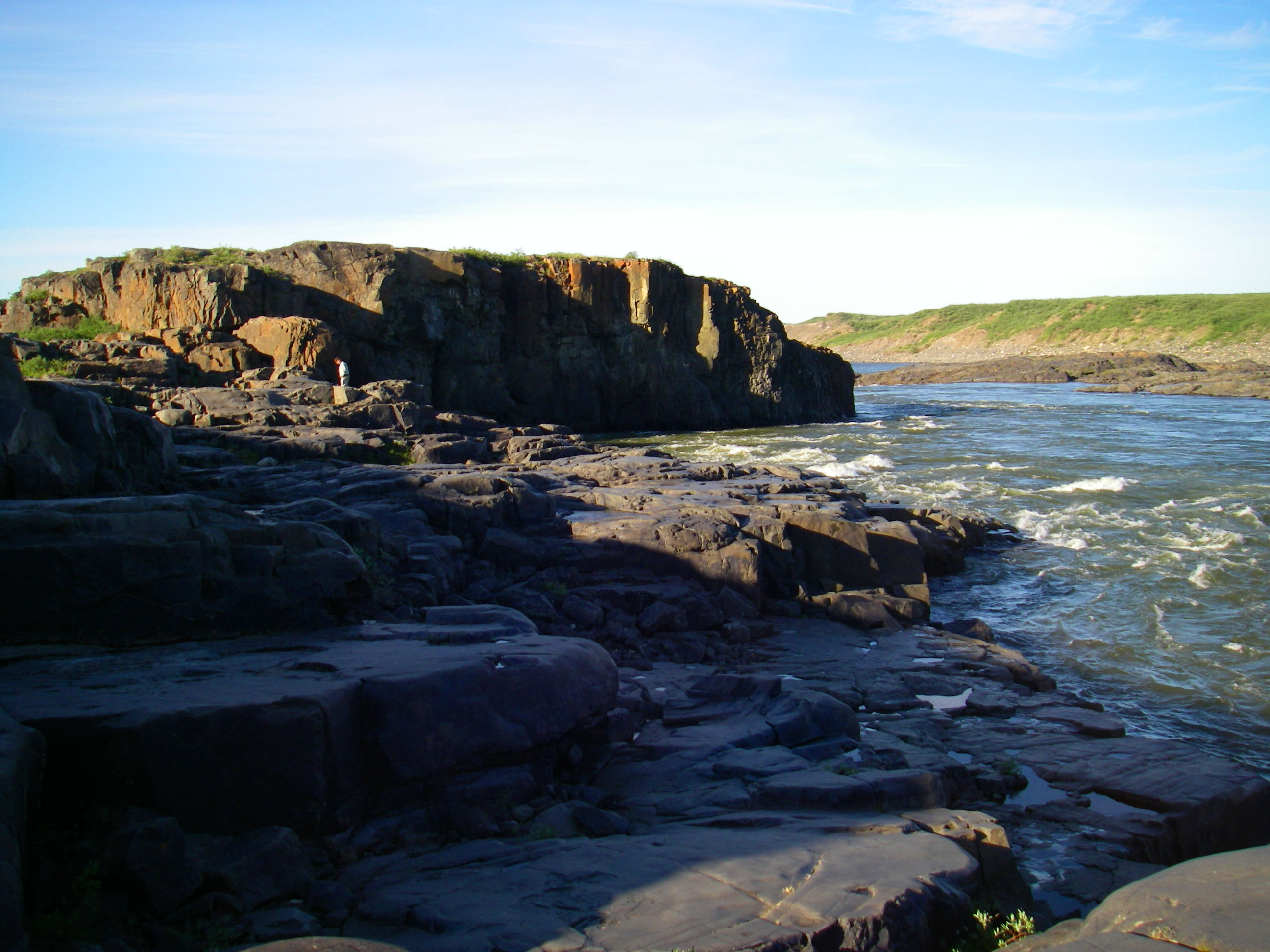
Bloody Falls area from west bank

Hearne began to remonstrate with his guides but failed in his attempt. He wrote of the events, "I endeavored as much as possible to persuade them from putting their inhuman design into execution; but so far were my intreaties from having the wished-for effect, that it was concluded that I was actuated by cowardice." On 1 June 1771, the few remaining women and children were left behind by the party, as well as the dogs and the heavy luggage, and a group of about 60 men advanced north towards the Coppermine River. On 2 July 1771, the party came across a group of Copper Indians, who learned the purpose of the exploration party's journey and supplied them with canoes and other necessities. However, 17 men abandoned the exploration party in the coming days, claiming that the difficulty of the trek outweighed the pleasure that was to be derived from killing the Inuit.

The remaining members of the exploration party arrived at the Coppermine River on 14 July 1771. Three scouts were sent to locate any Inuit who might have been camping near the river, as Hearne commenced his survey. The scouts returned on 16 July 1771 and reported that five Inuit tents had been found on the west side of the river. This news brought the survey work to a complete halt, and the men began to prepare for war.

== Massacre ==
Just after midnight on 17 July, the Dene set upon the Inuit camp and killed approximately 20 men, women, and children. Hearne was traumatized by the massacre, saying "I am confident that my features must have feelingly expressed how sincerely I was affected at the barbarous scene I then witnessed; even at this hour I cannot reflect on the transactions of that horrid day without shedding tears." He claims to have named the waterfall Bloody Falls.

== Legacy ==
The site of the massacre, which was the traditional home of the Kogluktogmiut, is now in Kugluk/Bloody Falls Territorial Park near Kugluktuk, Nunavut. It was designated a National Historic Site in 1978, however its designation as a historical site was not due to it being the site of the purported massacre, rather due to it being a "traditional fishing site, also containing small caribou hunting stations, that record the presence of Pre-Dorset, Thule, First Nation and Inuit cultures over the past three millennia."

In 1996, Dene and Inuit representatives participated in a joint healing ceremony at the site.

The incident is referred to in the John Newlove poem Samuel Hearne in Wintertime.

== See also ==
- List of massacres in Canada
