= Haneragmiut =

Haneragmiut were a geographically defined Copper Inuit subgroup in the Canadian territory of Nunavut. They were the most westerly band of those that hunted in southern Victoria Island. They were generally located on the north shore of Dolphin and Union Strait, north of Cape Bexley, and south of Prince Albert Sound, on Victoria Island. Though they migrated seasonally both north and south for hunting, fishing, and trade, they were unaware that Victoria Island was an island.

== Ethnology ==
Arctic explorer Vilhjalmur Stefansson discovered the Hanergmiut on May 17, 1910. At the time, the Haneragmiut numbered approximately 40 people. Seasonally, a few Haneragmiut hunted and traded to the south on the mainland with another Cape Bexley subgroup, the Akuliakattagmiut, while other Haneragmiut migrated as far north as Tahiryuak Lake to hunt caribou with the Kanianermiut. The Ekalluktogmiut were situated to the east of the Haneragmiut.

After his return to Seattle and New York City in 1912, Stefansson made the Haneragmiut, Kanhirgmiut and Nuwukpagmiut famous, referring to them as "Blond Eskimos".

Later studies by anthropologist Diamond Jenness showed that the subgroups of Akuliakattagmiut, Haneragmiut, Kogluktogmiut, Pallirmiut, Puiplirmiut, and Uallirgmiut {also known as the Kanianermiut} were mixed through intermarriage and by family shifting.
