= Uloqsaq =

Inuk hunter and murderer

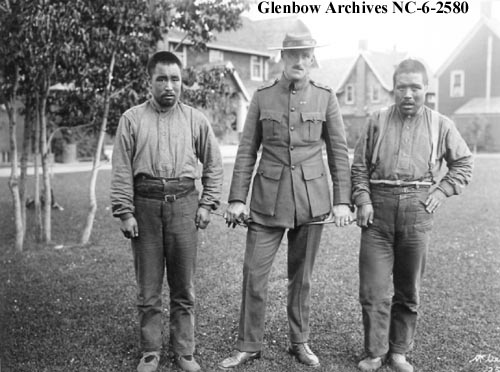
Uloqsaq (right) with Inspector Denny LaNauze (centre) and Sinnisiak (left)

Uloqsaq (also Uluksuk, and Uluksuk, alias Avingak (c. 1887 – September 24, 1929) was a Copper Inuk hunter of the Coppermine River region.

== Early life ==
Although it is not known exactly where and when Uloqsaq was born, it is thought he was born around 1887, as he was about 30 during his murder trial in 1917.

== The murders ==
In late 1913, Jean-Baptiste Rouvière and Guillaume Le Roux, two Missionary Oblates, were on a mission to convert the Copper Inuit in the Coppermine River region to Roman Catholicism while heading towards Coronation Gulf. They were doing this, they claimed, because they had heard rumours that Anglican missionaries were attempting to perform the same in that region, and wanted to convert the Inuit in the area to their denomination first. The priests enlisted the assistance of Uloqsaq as well as Sinnisiak, another hunter, and paid them in traps. However, Le Roux, who had a short temper, quickly got angry with the two Inuit men, who soon decided that Le Roux's anger meant that the priests wanted to kill them. Sinnisiak urged Uloqsaq to help him kill the two men, and the priests were shot, stabbed and axed to death. For ritualistic reasons, the two Inuit ate a portion of the two priests' livers.

Some Inuit later told the investigating policemen a different story. One man, an Inuk elder named Koeha, told the story quite differently. He claimed that at an Inuit camp, a man had stolen a rifle from one of the priests and gotten into a fight with Le Roux. Although the Inuit who had stolen the weapon wanted to kill Le Roux, the priests managed to escape. Sinnisiak and Uloqsaq began to follow the priests, and caught up with them at Bloody Falls, where Sinnisiak stabbed and shot the two men. Although Uloqsaq assisted on Sinnisiak's urging, he said that he did not want to kill the priest and did so only because he had been told to by Sinnisiak.

== Investigation and trial ==
A Royal North-West Mounted Police investigation began after word reached Fort Norman that Inuit had been seen wearing the priests' clothing, and the two men surrendered themselves without incident in May 1916. Part of Uloqsaq's police statement read, "I wanted to speak; Ilogoak [Le Roux] put his hand over my mouth... Ilogoak pointed the gun at us. I was afraid and I was crying... Sinnisiak said to me 'We ought to kill these white men before they kill us.'" Partly due to a previous incident with similar circumstances following which no action was taken, the authorities wished to make an example out of the two Inuit men, and Sinnisiak was tried in Edmonton for the murder of Rouvière, largely because it was thought that Sinnisiak had been the 'ringleader'. He was found not guilty because the jury thought that the Inuk man had cause to kill the priest.

Following the not guilty verdict, the two Inuit men were taken to Calgary in late August, where they were found guilty of the murder of Le Roux. This was the first time Inuit had been found guilty of murder in a Canadian court. The law at that time had a mandatory sentence of death for the crime of murder, yet the jury and the judge did not wish for the pair to die for their crimes owing to the provocative nature of the priests' actions before their deaths. To avoid the death penalty, the judge sentenced the pair to death by hanging, with the execution date set as October 15. The sentence was immediately commuted to life imprisonment at a Fort Resolution police station. In 1919, the pair assisted police in establishing a new police contingent at Tree River, and in 1922 were released.

== Later life ==
By the late 1920s, Uloqsaq has established himself in Bernard Harbour, and was found unable to hunt due to spinal tuberculosis by the Anglican archdeacon Archibald Lang Fleming in 1928. The tuberculosis, which was most likely contracted during his time in prison, was part of an epidemic of the same sweeping Inuit populations in Canada at the time. Uloqsaq was taken to a hospital, but as the hospital was unable to provide for his long-term needs, he was taken home to the Coppermine River region, where he died in September 1929.
