= Matonabbee =

Chipewyan hunter and leader

Matonabbee (c. 1737 – 1782) was a Chipewyan hunter and leader. He was also a trader and a Chipewyan representative at the Prince of Wales Fort. He travelled with Chief Akaitcho's older brother, Keskarrah. After his father died, Matonabbee spent some time living at Prince of Wales Fort where he learned to speak English.

He acted as a guide for Samuel Hearne during his exploration from 1770 to 1772, together they travelled more than 5,600 km (3,500 mi). On July 14, 1771, while on an Arctic overland journey, he, his followers, and a group of Yellowknives, Dene Suline, also known as Chepewyan, who had joined them at Clowey Lake, massacred a group of over 20 unsuspecting Inuinnait, also known as Copper Inuit; this would be known as the Bloody Falls massacre.

A combination of the deaths of many Chipewyans during a smallpox epidemic of 1782, and the defeat of Fort Prince of Wales by the French in the same year, caused Matonabbee to become depressed. Fort Prince of Wales had been the primary source of his fortune and fame and he had been the main middleman between the various tribes of the Cree and the Hudson's Bay Company. He then committed suicide by hanging himself, thus being the earliest record of a northern First Nations to kill himself.
