= Bexley (given name) =

- Gender: Unisex

Origin
- Origin: English
- Meaning: Transferred use of surname and place name meaning box tree clearing

Bexley is a given name of English origin, a transferred use of a surname or place name meaning “clearing surrounded by box trees”.

== Popularity ==
The name has been among the one thousand most popular names for girls born in the United States since 2016. Two syllable surnames and names ending with the suffix -ley are currently fashionable for American girls.

Variant spellings also in use in the United States include Bexlee, Bexleigh, Bexli, Bexlie, and Bexly. Short forms and elaborations of the name in use include Bex and Bexlynn.

The name is also in use for boys in the United States, but Bexley has never ranked among the one thousand most popular names used for American boys.
