= Cape Bexley =

Headland in Nunavut, Canada

- Cape
- Coordinates: 69°01′N 115°55′W
- Location: Kitikmeot Region, Nunavut, Canada
- Offshore water bodies: Dolphin and Union Strait

Cape Bexley is a headland in the northern Canadian territory of Nunavut. It is located on the mainland, on the south shore of Dolphin and Union Strait, and bounded on the south by Souths Bay. It was named after Nicholas Vansittart, 1st Baron Bexley.

It is the ancestral home of the Akuliakattagmiut, a Copper Inuit subgroup. Haneragmiut camped here, too, and Nagyuktogmiut were visitors.
