= Coppermine River =

River in Canada

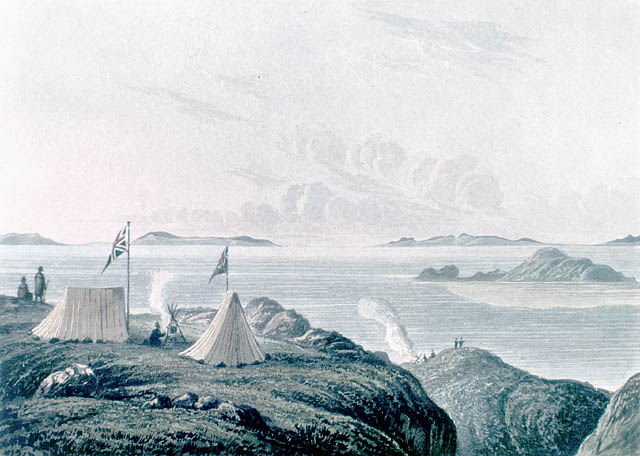
- View of the Arctic Sea from the mouth of the Coppermine River (1821) by George Back

- Coppermine River mouth location

Location
- Country: Canada

Physical characteristics
- Source: Lac de Gras
  - location: Northwest Territories, Canada
  - coordinates: 64°35′01″N 111°11′33″W
  - elevation: 396 m (1,299 ft)
- Mouth: Coronation Gulf
  - location: Nunavut, Arctic Ocean, Canada
  - coordinates: 67°48′43″N 115°05′05″W
  - elevation: 0 m (0 ft)
- Length: 845 km (525 mi)
- Basin size: 50,700 km^{2} (19,600 sq mi)
- Discharge
  - average: 337.69 m^{3}/s (11,925 cu ft/s)
  - minimum: 10.37 m^{3}/s (366 cu ft/s)
  - maximum: 1,500 m^{3}/s (53,000 cu ft/s)

The Coppermine River is a river in the North Slave and Kitikmeot regions of the Northwest Territories and Nunavut in Canada. It is 845 kilometres (525 mi) long. It rises in Lac de Gras, a small lake near Great Slave Lake, and flows generally north to Coronation Gulf, an arm of the Arctic Ocean. The river freezes in winter but may still flow under the ice.

The community of Kugluktuk (formerly Coppermine) is located at the river's mouth.

== History ==
The river was named for the copper ores which are located along the river, by Samuel Hearne in 1771. Hearne found only one lump of copper and commercial mining was not considered viable.

Bloody Falls, part of the Kugluk/Bloody Falls Territorial Park, is located 18.5 kilometres (11.5 mi) from Kugluktuk, and was home to the Kogluktogmiut a sub-group of the Copper Inuit. It is the site of the Bloody Falls Massacre, when Matonabbee, Samuel Hearne's guide, and his fellow Chipewyan warriors ambushed and massacred the local Inuit.

== Geology ==
The river is on the northwestern part of the Canadian Shield. It was part of the broad region covered by the Laurentide ice sheet, which melted away 10,000 years ago. Above and below Bloody Falls, the river's width is broad due to fluvioglacial erosion. At the falls, the river is described to be a narrow and fast-moving rapid with the elevation dropping by 10 metres (33 ft) from the start to the end of the falls. The Coppermine River at Bloody Falls is surrounded by steep rocky slopes and sandy gullies. There is a basalt deposit which reaches 20 m above the river and displays a gradual slope into a flat, rocky beach downstream. The Coppermine Mountains are located on the west side of the river.

== Ecology ==
Willow was observed growing at the top of the basalt deposit at Bloody Falls. Locals described the willow being a recent arrival and appeared in previous decades according to a study in 1970. The area is at the northern edge of the tree line. White spruce was found in the area but its height was stunted. The landscape is on the border of stunted forest and shrubs shifting to Arctic tundra. A survey conducted in 2014 found 300 plant species in the lower Coppermine River valley, which was considered to be relatively high compared to other regional and local areas in Nunavut and more diverse than plant species found in Tuktut Nogait National Park.

== Gallery ==
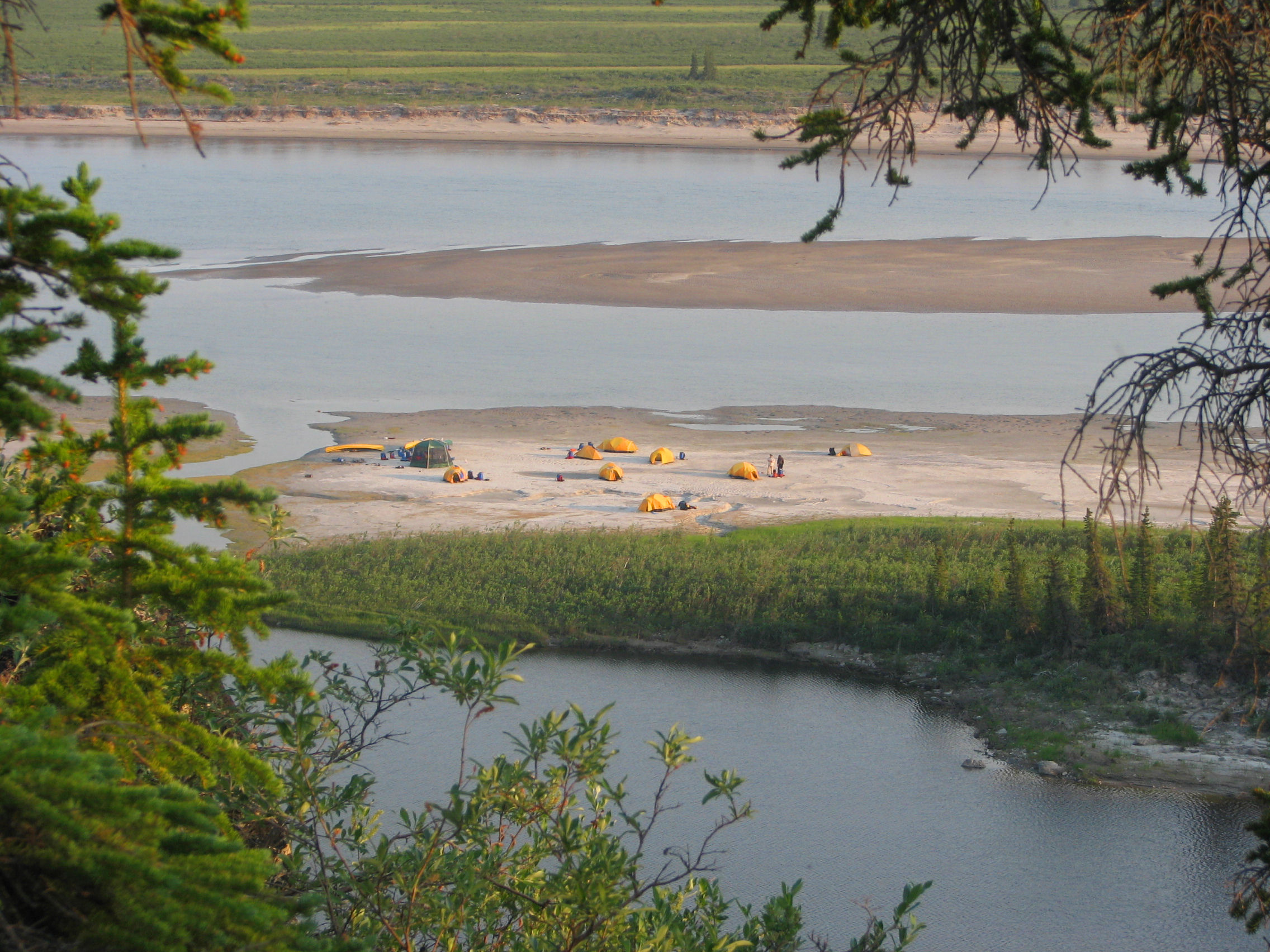
Canoeists camping along river

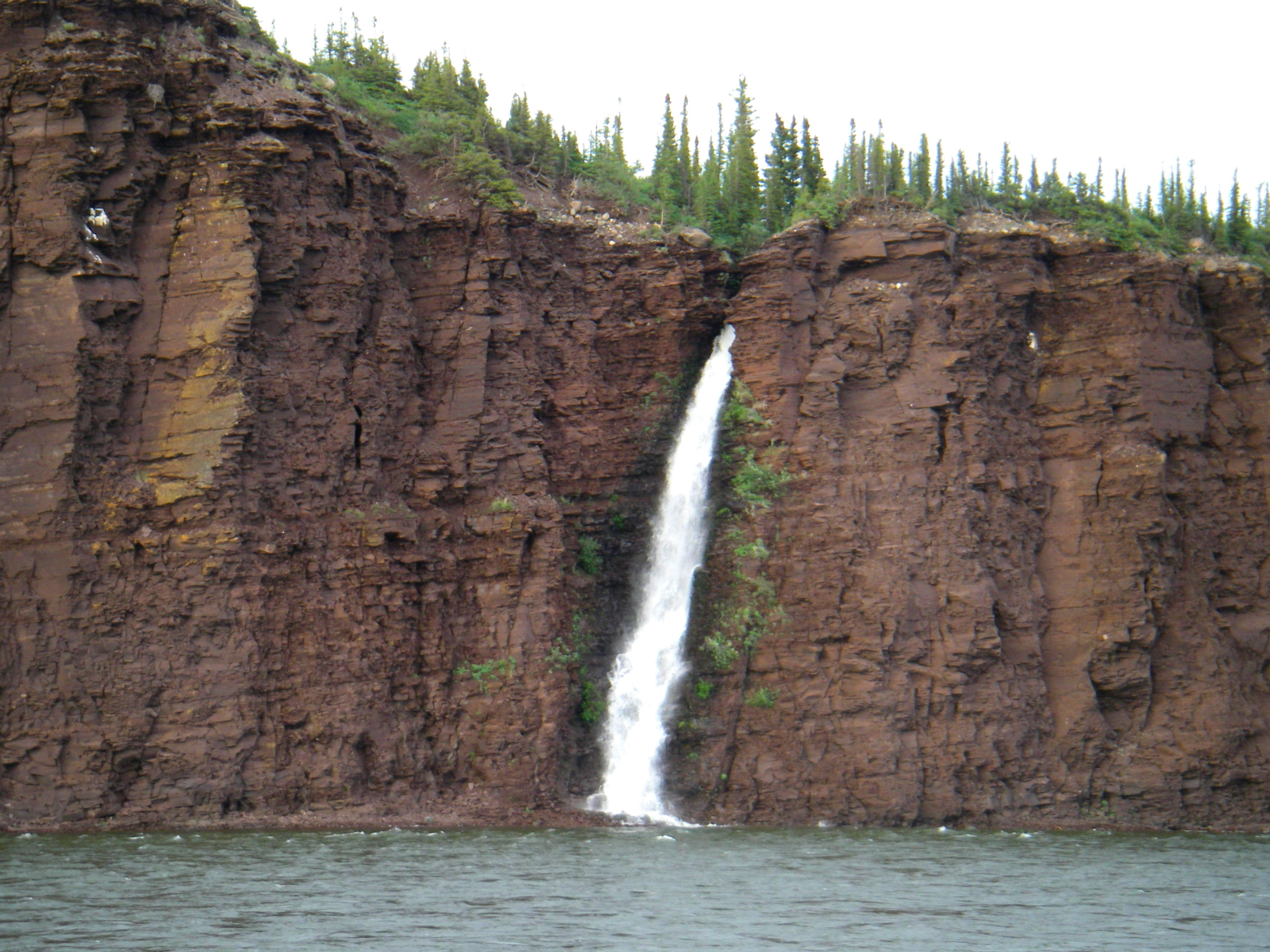
One of many waterfalls along the river

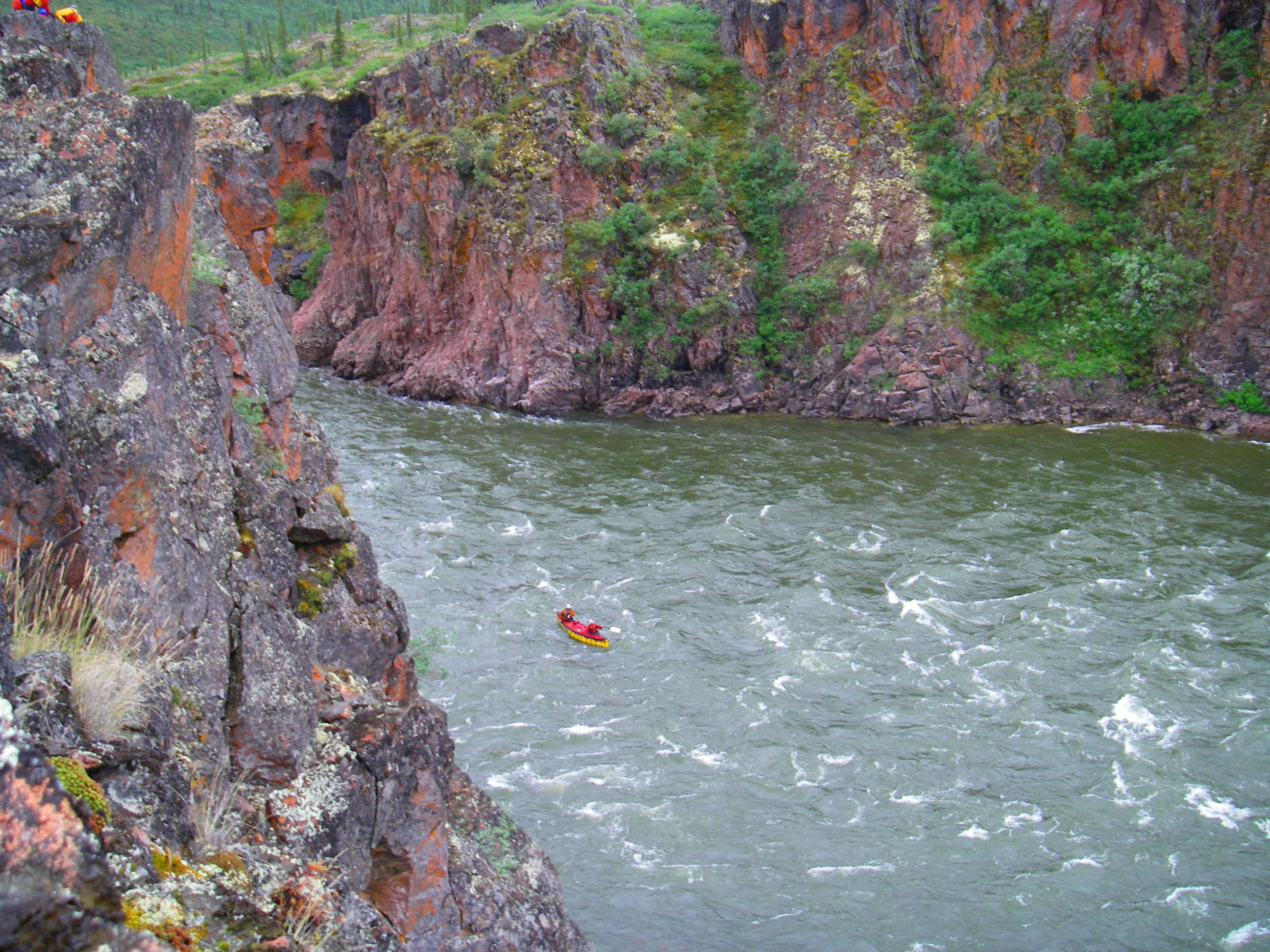
Canoeing the Rocky Defile

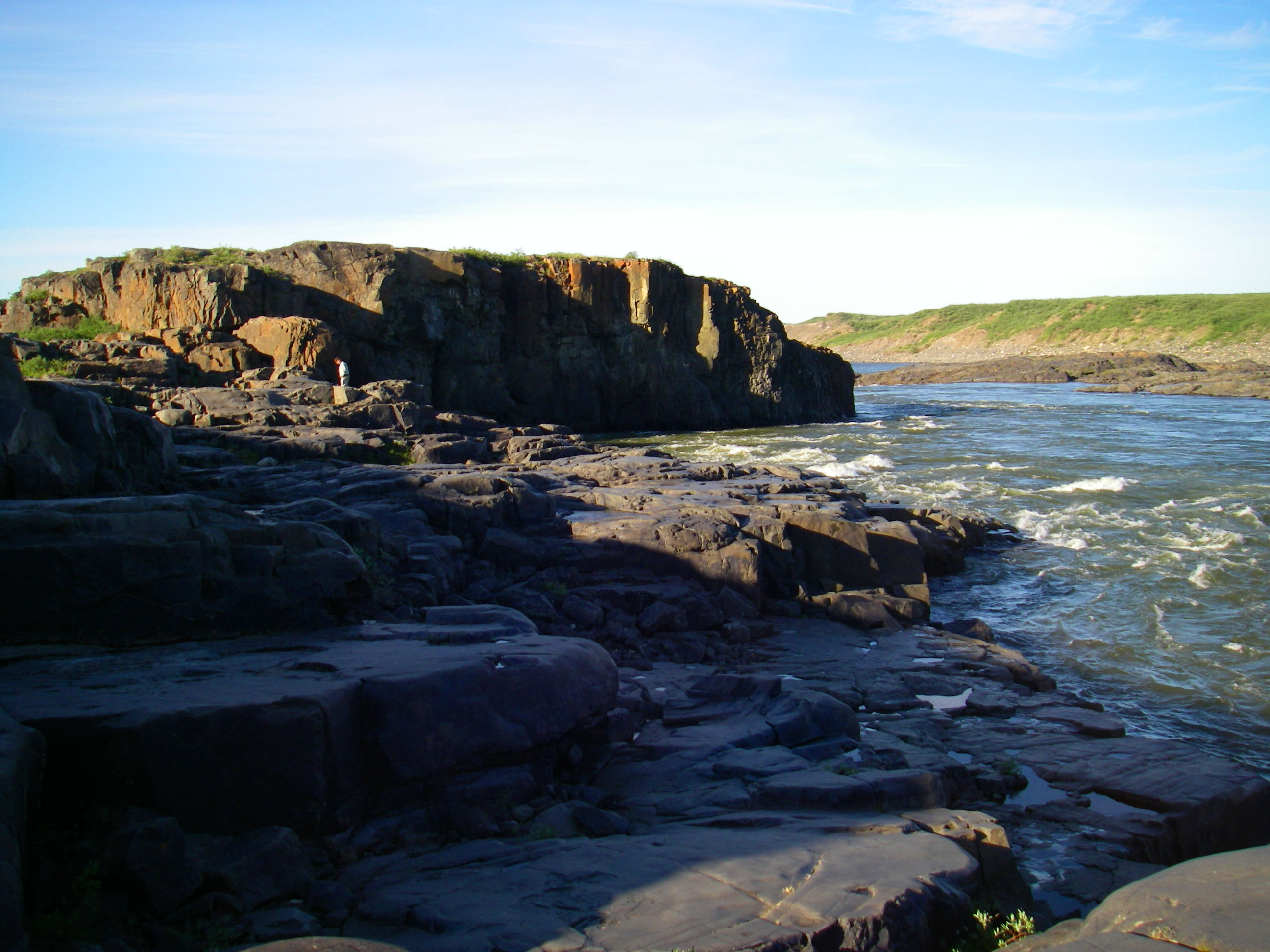
Bloody Falls

== See also ==
- List of longest rivers of Canada
- Coppermine Herald
