= Inuit weapons =

Hunting and weaponry tools

Inuit weapons were primarily hunting tools which served a dual purpose as weapons, whether against other Inuit groups or against their traditional enemies, the Chipewyan, Tłı̨chǫ (Dogrib), Dene, and Cree.

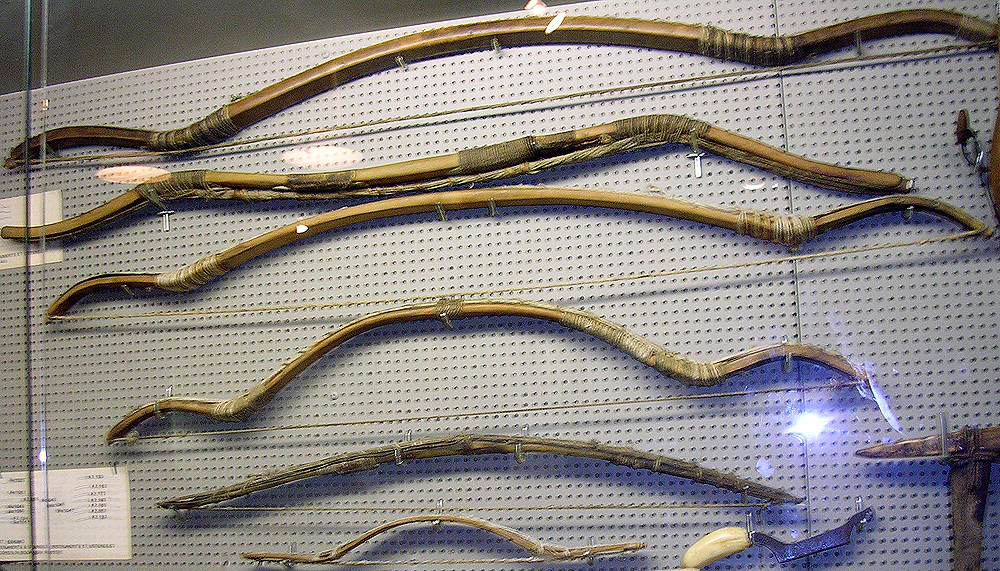
Six Inuit bows displayed at the Museum of Anthropology in Vancouver

The bows carried by the Inuit were distinctive in that some were cable-backed bows, where a wrapped cord supplemented the tensile strength of the bow.

== Types of weapon ==
- War harpoon
- War club
- Spear-thrower
- Cable-backed bow
- Bolas
- Toggling harpoon
- Kakivak
- Ulu
- Snow knife
- Inuit axe
- Inuit crossbow
