= Bloody Falls =

Waterfall in Nunavut, Canada

Coordinates: 67°44′37″N 115°22′03″W

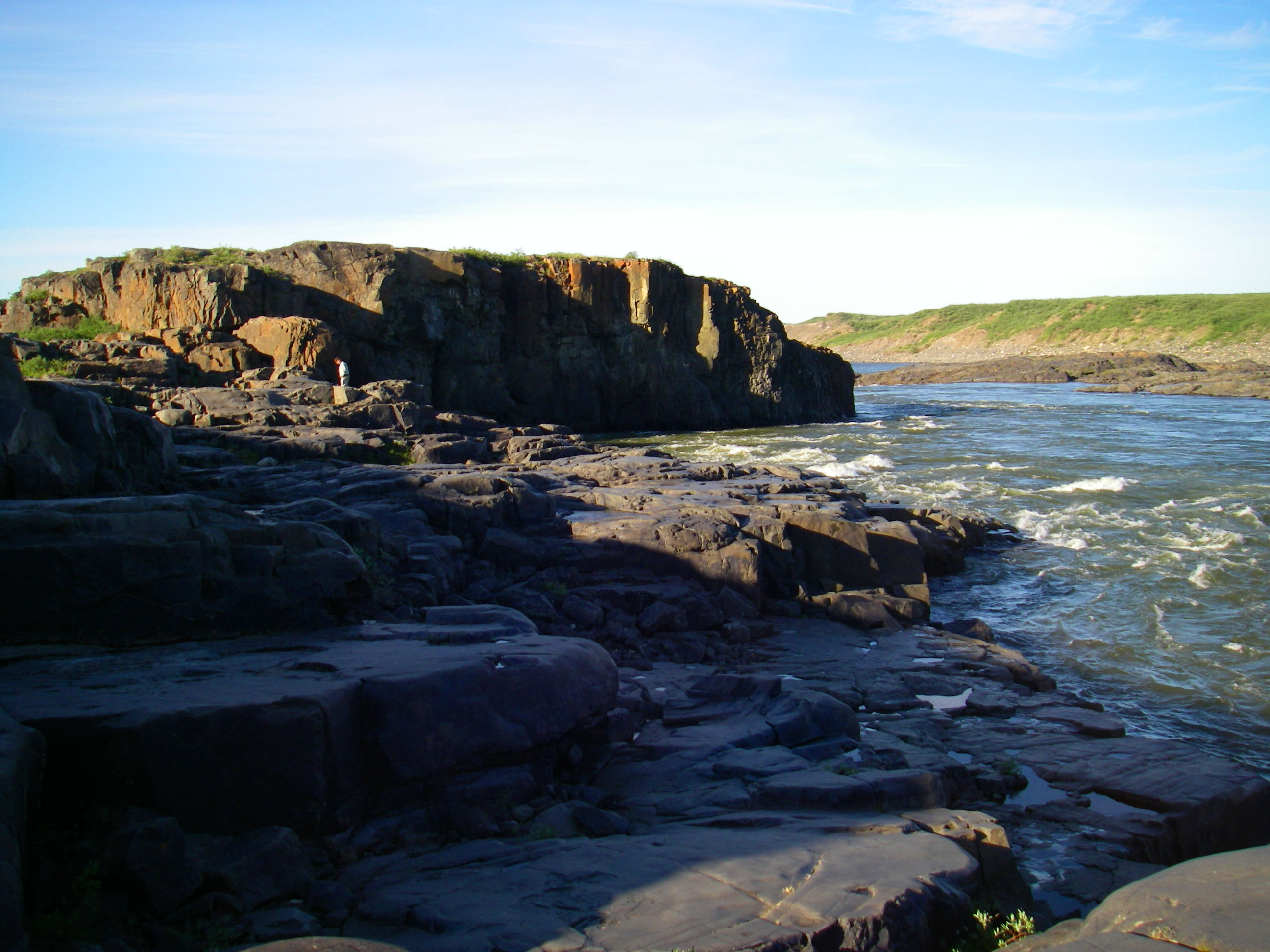
Middle of rapids

Bloody Falls (or Bloody Fall, or Kugluk, meaning "waterfall" in Inuinnaqtun) is a waterfall on the Coppermine River, in the Kugluk/Bloody Falls Territorial Park of Nunavut, Canada. It was the site of the Bloody Falls Massacre in 1771 and the murder of two priests by Uloqsaq and Sinnisiak, two Copper Inuit men in 1913.

The nearest community, Kugluktuk, Nunavut, is 15 km (9.3 mi) northeast. The traditional campsite at the falls is known as Onoagahiovik ("the place where you stay all night") because it's a good fishing area.

== History ==
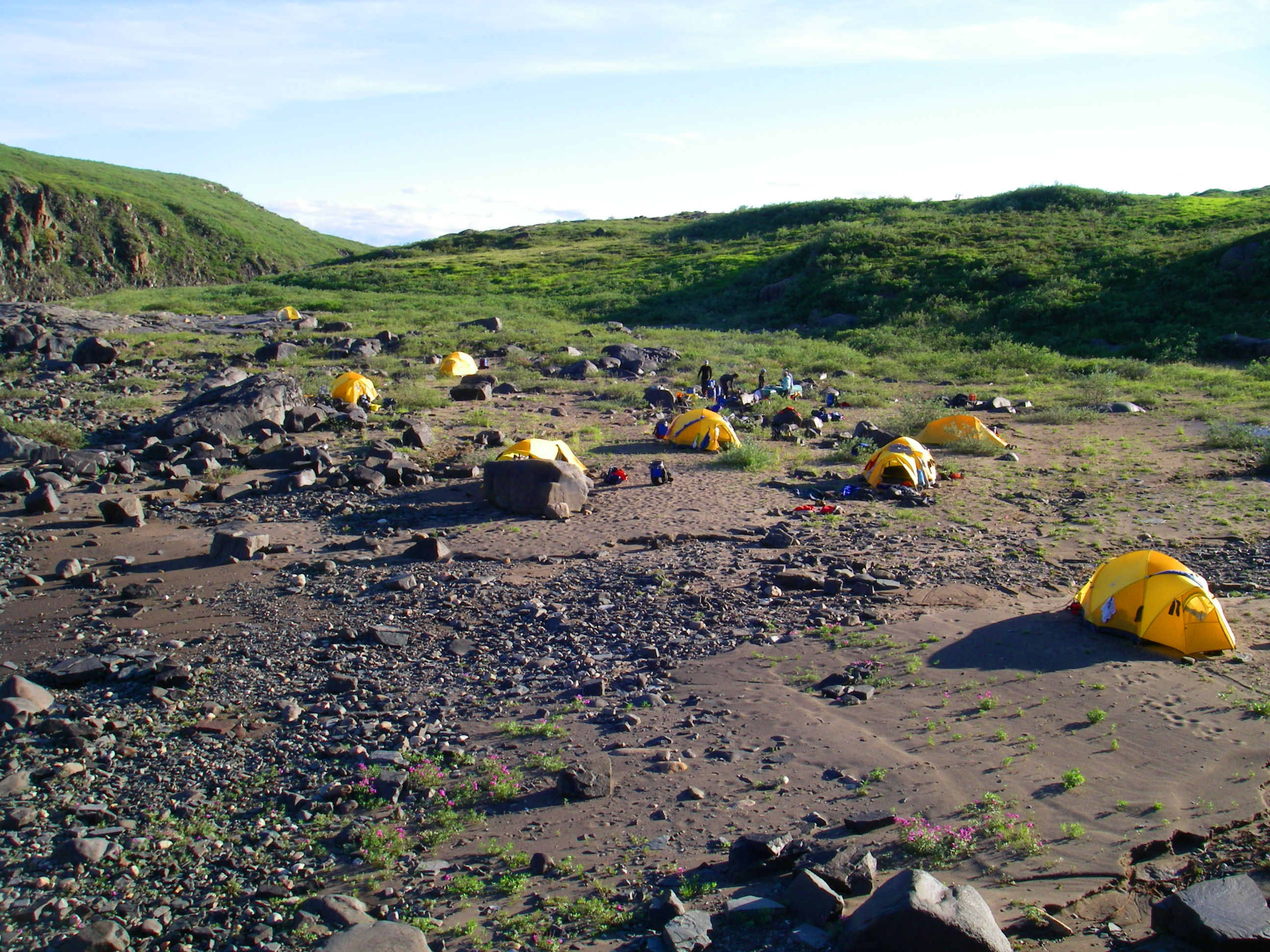
Canoers' campsite during portage around rapids

Historically, this area was occupied by the Kogluktogmiut subgroup of Copper Inuit dating back to 1500 CE. Previously, it was occupied by Paleo-Inuit around 1300 BCE and then by Indigenous caribou hunters between 500 BCE and 500 CE.

In 1978, the portion of the Territorial Park northwest of the Coppermine River was designated the Bloody Falls National Historic Site of Canada, as the archaeological remains of pre-contact hunting and fishing sites in the area form a record of the presence of Pre-Dorset, Thule, First Nation and Inuit peoples over the last 3000 years.

In 1996, Dene and Inuit met to hold a healing ceremony to reconcile their historical differences.
