= Kugluk/Bloody Falls Territorial Park =

Territorial park in Nunavut, Canada

Coordinates: 67°44′24″N 115°22′12″W

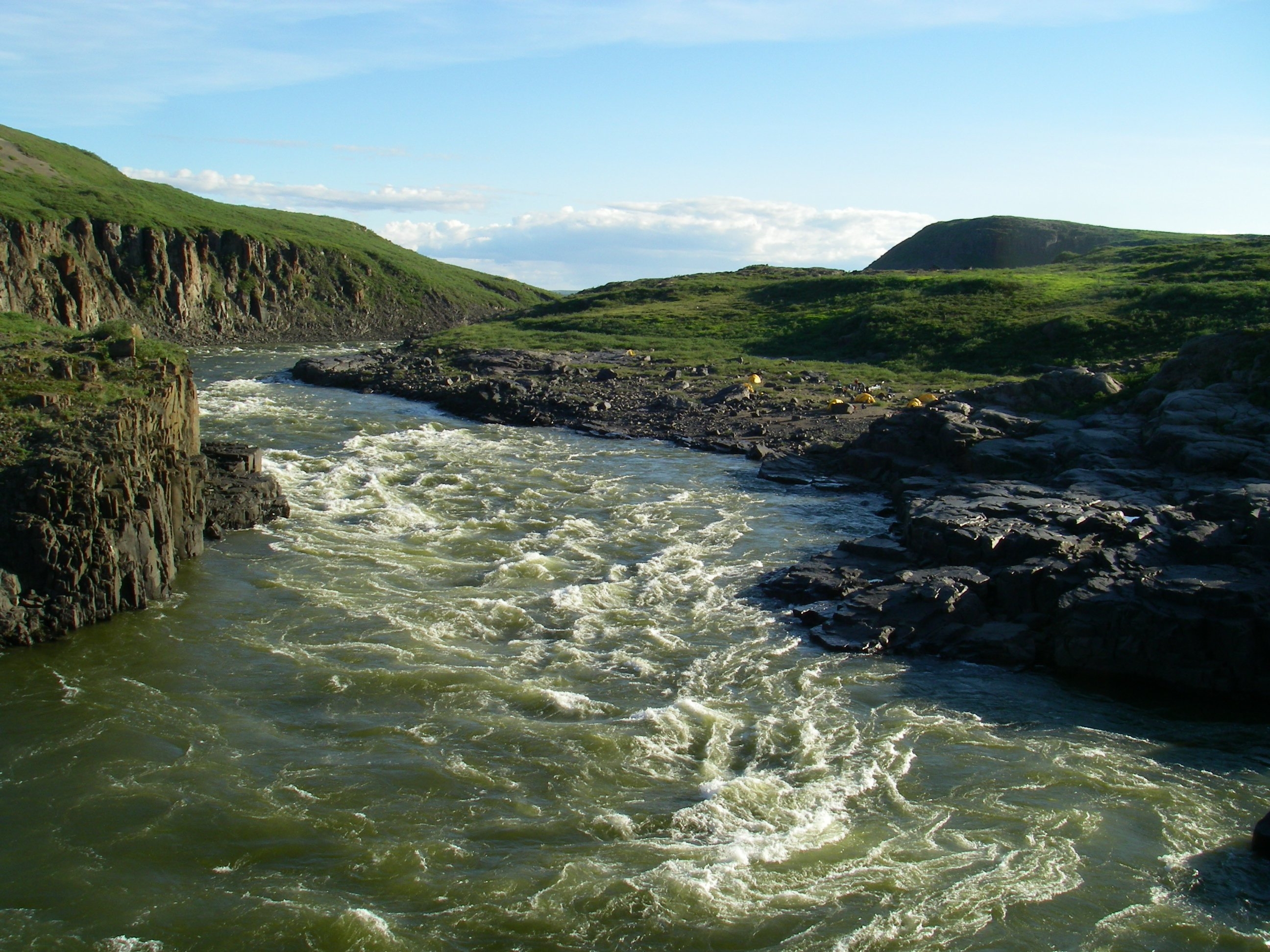
Rapids above Bloody Falls

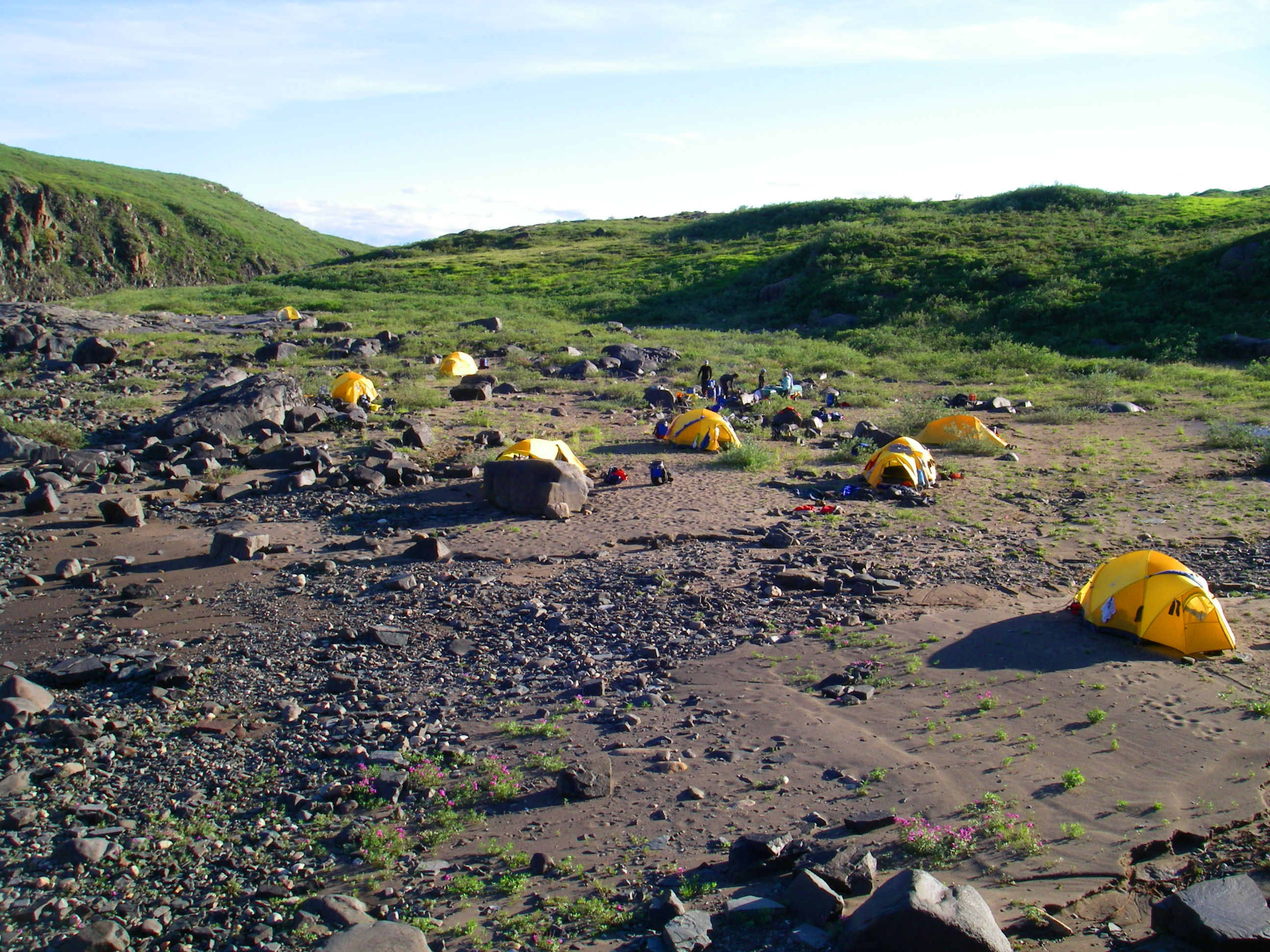
Canoers camping in the park

Kugluk/Bloody Falls Territorial Park or Kugluk Territorial Park (Inuinnaqtun: kugluk; English: waterfall) is located about 15 km (9.3 mi) southwest of Kugluktuk, Nunavut, Canada. The 10 ha (25 acres) park is situated around the Bloody Falls on the Coppermine River and was listed as a national historic site in 1978.

The park is probably best known as the site of the Bloody Falls massacre that occurred when Samuel Hearne's Chipewyan guides massacred a group of Copper Inuit they found camped at the falls.

== Ethnography ==
The area, both inside and outside the current park boundaries, was used by both Inuit and First Nations people stretching back over thousands of years. Although the park today lies outside of the modern range of the Bathurst caribou herd (named for Bathurst Inlet) the area was a major hunting ground. Evidence, such as antler huts, show that it was used by both groups as a major barren-ground caribou hunting region. The river and falls were also a major fishing area and remain so today.

=== Dene ===
Taltheilei Shale tradition, pre-historic ancestors of the Dene, campsites about 1500 years old, may be found in the area. There is also evidence of 7000-year-old Indian campsites.

=== Inuit ===
Early Paleoeskimo (Pre-Dorset culture) sites are found here and have been dated to over 3500 years. Within the last 500 years the Thule people built stone houses in the park.

=== Today ===
With the division of the Northwest Territories in 1999 the area is less used by the Dene than in previous times. Inuit from Kugluktuk still travel to the area to fish and hunt but the park is mainly a tourist attraction. The park can be reached by motorboat, about 45 minutes, all-terrain vehicle, about two hours or by a four to five hour walk. The park also provides a camping spot for canoeists travelling along the river and a special portage trail has been constructed. The campsite is situated just below the falls and is called "Onoagahiovik" in Inuinnaqtun. There are plans to build an information booth in the park and a "comfort station" is already in place.

== Geography ==
The area is typical Arctic tundra and along the sides of the river are the cliffs that lead to the falls. Rocky escarpments can be found and it is possible to see the Arctic Ocean from hills within the park. The fast flowing river, normally fairly wide, is forced through the cliffs in the park and create the falls before spreading out again.

== Fauna ==
In addition to herds of caribou, a visitor to the park may observe grizzly bears and wolverines. Bird species such as the golden eagle, rough-legged hawk, peregrine falcon, gyrfalcon, and swallows may be observed in the park. The last are found in large numbers and nest in the cliffs around the falls.

== Flora ==
Although the park falls north of the tree line, stunted trees such as the dwarf willow do occur alongside the Coppermine River. The black-tipped groundsel (Senecio lugens) is also found in the park. The plant was named by John Richardson while travelling the river with John Franklin in 1821 during his first expedition. The word "lugens" is derived from the Latin word "to mourn" and is supposed to commemorate the massacre. Researchers have documented 207 vascular plant taxa in Kugluk/Bloody Falls Territorial Park.

== See also ==
- List of Nunavut parks
