= Akuliakattagmiut =

Subgroup of Copper Inuit

Akuliakattagmiut were a geographically defined Copper Inuit subgroup in the Canadian territory of Nunavut. They were located near Cape Bexley on the south shore, mainland side of Dolphin and Union Strait, and in the vicinity of the Melville Hills' Akuliakattak Lake, the source of the Rae River.

== Culture ==
Akuliakattagmiut wore more seal than other Copper Inuit. They did not wear belts at the hips, rather their pants come to the waist.

According to Vilhjalmur Stefansson, the Akuliakattagmiut showed fear of guns, while other Inuit did not. All of their tools were sharp: iron snow knives, ulus; steel whittling knives, crooked knives, needles; copper ice picks; and metal scrappers.

Some Akuliakattagmiut songs were of Uallirnergmiut origin. Their trade partners included the Haneragmiut and the Puiplirmiut.
