= Anchor Island (Nunavut) =

Island in Kitikmeot Region, Nunavut, Canada

- Location within Nunavut Location within Canada

Geography
- Location: Coronation Gulf
- Coordinates: 68°08′N 112°47′W
- Archipelago: Canadian Arctic Archipelago

Administration
- Canada
- Territory: Nunavut
- Region: Kitikmeot

Demographics
- Population: Uninhabited

Anchor Island is an island located within Coronation Gulf, south of Victoria Island, in the Kitikmeot Region, Nunavut, Canada.

Other islands in the vicinity include Duke of York Archipelago, Haodlon Island, Hatoayok Island, Hokagon Island, Kabviukvik Island, Kingak Island, Mangak Island, Nanortut Island, Nanukton Island, Takhoalok Island, as well as the Aiyohok Islands, Akvitlak Islands, Black Berry Islands, Home Islands, Lawford Islands, Miles Islands, Nauyan Islands, and Outcast Islands.
