= Haodlon Island =

Island in Nunavut, Canada

- Location within Nunavut Location within Canada

Geography
- Location: Coronation Gulf
- Coordinates: 68°02′N 113°18′W
- Archipelago: Canadian Arctic Archipelago

Administration
- Canada
- Territory: Nunavut
- Region: Kitikmeot

Demographics
- Population: Uninhabited

Haodlon Island is an island located within Coronation Gulf, south of Victoria Island, in the Kitikmeot Region, Nunavut, Canada. It is situated at an elevation of 9 m (30 ft) above sea level.

Other islands in the vicinity include Anchor Island, Hatoayok Island, Hokagon Island, Kabviukvik Island, Mangak Island, Nanortut Island, and Nanukton Island, as well as the Berens Islands, Black Berry Islands, Deadman Islands, Home Islands, Lawford Islands, Leo Islands, and Sir Graham Moore Islands. The community of Kugkluktuk (formerly Coppermine) is located on the mainland, 83.5 km (51.9 mi) to the south.
