= Edinburgh Island =

Island in Nunavut, Canada

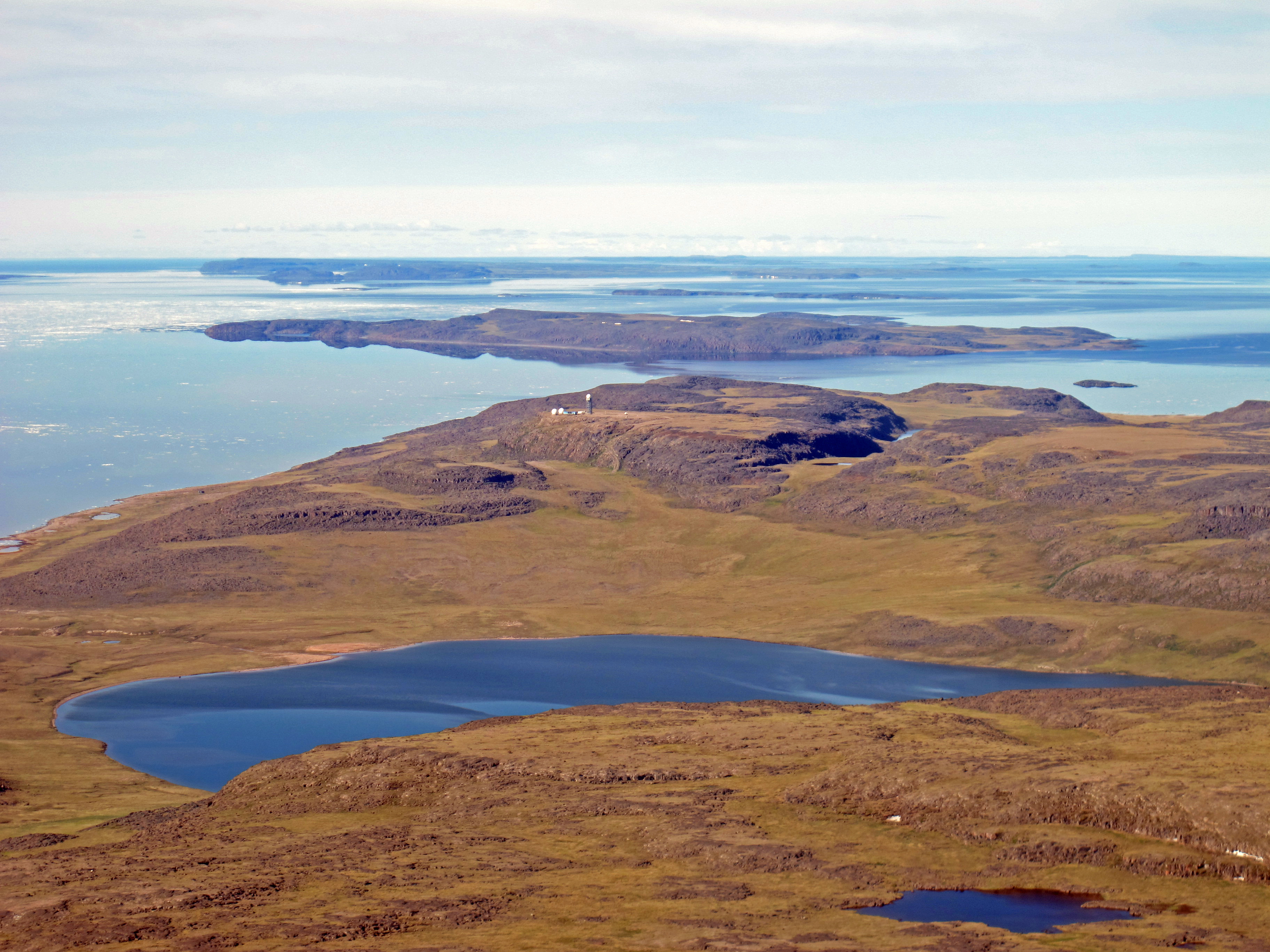
- Looking south on Edinburgh Island

- Location within Nunavut Location within Canada

Geography
- Location: Coronation Gulf
- Coordinates: 68°31′N 110°51′W
- Archipelago: Arctic Archipelago

Administration
- Canada
- Territory: Nunavut
- Region: Kitikmeot

Demographics
- Population: Uninhabited

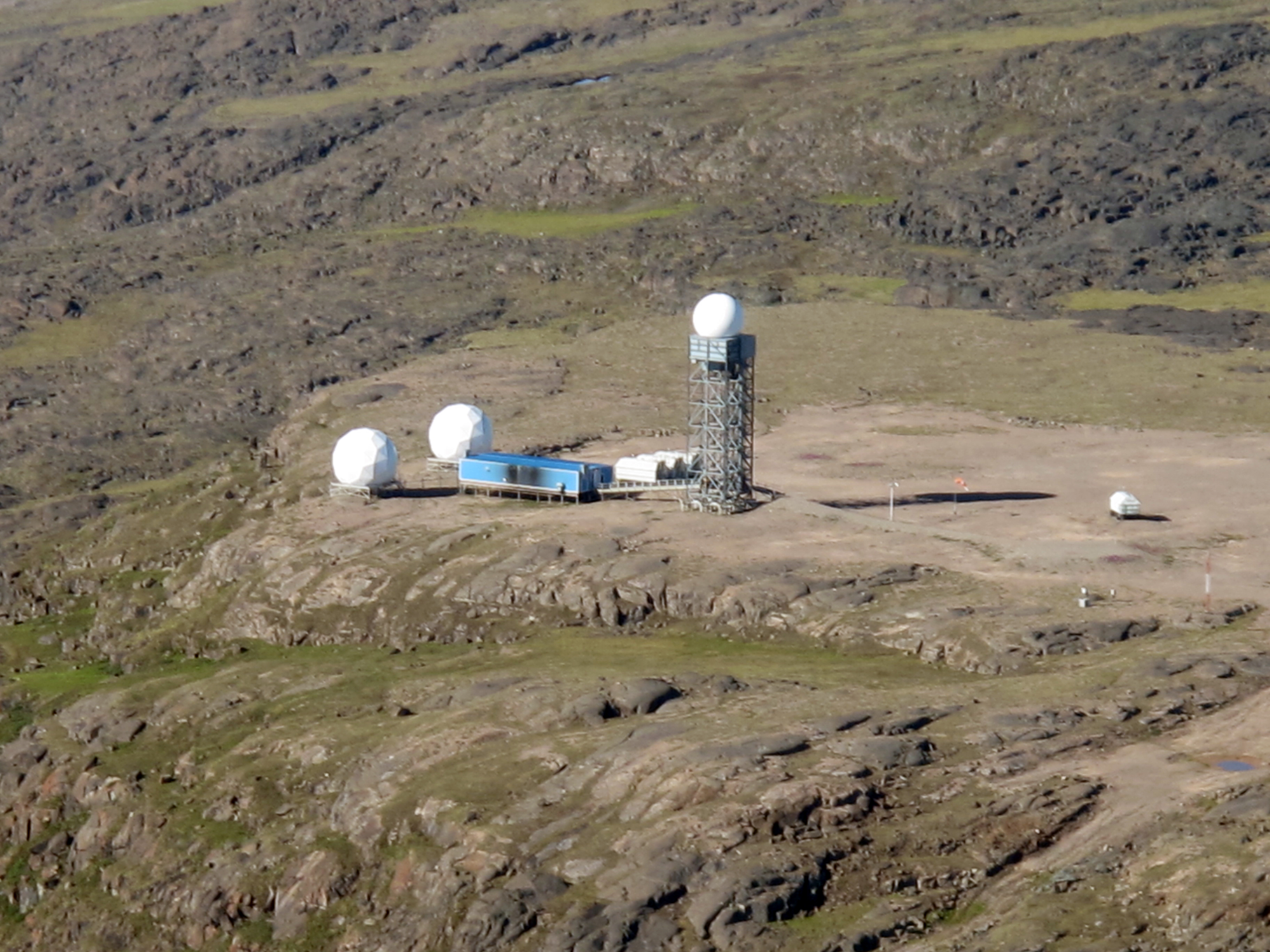
North Warning site PIN-DA on Edinburgh Island

Edinburgh Island is an island located within Coronation Gulf, south of Victoria Island, in the Kitikmeot Region, Nunavut, Canada. It is approximately 103 m (338 ft) above sea level.

Other islands in the vicinity include Doak Island, Bate Islands, Outpost Islands, Richardson Islands, Sesqui Islands, and Sisters Islands.

Edinburgh Island, PIN-DA, is a former Distant Early Warning Line and a current North Warning System site.
