= Onitkok Island =

Island in Nunavut, Canada

- Location within Nunavut Location within Canada

Geography
- Location: Coronation Gulf
- Coordinates: 67°49′59″N 114°32′25″W
- Archipelago: Arctic Archipelago

Administration
- Canada
- Territory: Nunavut
- Region: Kitikmeot

Demographics
- Population: Uninhabited

Onitkok Island is an island located inside western Coronation Gulf, south of Victoria Island, in the Kitikmeot Region, Nunavut, Canada. It is situated between the Couper Islands and the mainland. Other island groups in the vicinity include the Berens Islands, Deadman Islands, Leo Islands, Nichols Islands, and Sir Graham Moore Islands. Additionally, Blaze Island, Kigirktaryuk Island, and Seven Mile Island are nearby. The community of Kugkluktuk (formerly Coppermine) is located on the mainland, 24.1 km (15.0 mi) to the southwest.
