= Little Camping Island =

Island in Nunavut, Canada

- Location within Nunavut Location within Canada

Geography
- Location: Northern Canada
- Coordinates: 68°36′N 113°43′W
- Archipelago: Arctic Archipelago

Administration
- Canada
- Territory: Nunavut

Demographics
- Population: Uninhabited

Little Camping Island is located in the Dolphin and Union Strait, southwest of Victoria Island, in the Kitikmeot Region, Nunavut, Canada.

Close by are Bowers Island, Camping Island, Chantry Island, Cox Island, Douglas Island, Ivonayak Island, Lambert Island, Sweeney Island, and Teddy Bear Island, the Aiyohok Islands and Deadman Islands, as well as the North Warning System sites at Lady Franklin Point and Bernard Harbour.
