= Seven Mile Island (Nunavut) =

Island in Nunavut, Canada

- Location within Nunavut Location within Canada

Geography
- Location: Coronation Gulf
- Coordinates: 67°55′N 114°53′W
- Archipelago: Arctic Archipelago

Administration
- Canada
- Territory: Nunavut
- Region: Kitikmeot

Demographics
- Population: Uninhabited

Seven Mile Island is an island located inside western Coronation Gulf, south of Victoria Island, in the Kitikmeot Region, Nunavut, Canada.

Other islands in the vicinity include Blaze Island, Kigirktaryuk Island, Onitkok Island, and the Berens Islands, Couper Islands, Deadman Islands, Nichols Islands, and Sir Graham Moore Islands. The community of Kugkluktuk (formerly Coppermine) is located on the mainland, 13.8 km (8.6 mi) to the southwest.
