= Home Islands (Nunavut) =

Island group in Nunavut, Canada

- Location within Nunavut Location within Canada

Geography
- Location: Coronation Gulf
- Coordinates: 67°58′N 112°23′W

Administration
- Canada
- Territory: Nunavut
- Region: Kitikmeot

Demographics
- Population: Uninhabited

The Home Islands are an island group located in the Coronation Gulf, south of Victoria Island, in the Kitikmeot Region, Nunavut, Canada. The mouth of Tree River is 39.2 km (24.4 mi) to the south.

Other island groups in the vicinity include the Akvitlak Islands, Berens Islands, Black Berry Islands, Couper Islands, Lawford Islands, Leo Islands, and Sir Graham Moore Islands.
