= List of rivers of Nunavut =

List of rivers in Nunavut Province, Canada

This is a list of rivers that are in whole or partly in Nunavut, Canada:

== By watershed ==
=== Arctic watershed ===
- Beaufort Sea
  - Great Bear Lake (Northwest Territories)
    - Bloody River
    - Dease River
  - Horton River
- Viscount Melville Sound
  - Nanook River (Victoria Island)
- Amundsen Gulf
  - Hornaday River
  - Roscoe River
  - Croker River
  - Harding River
  - Kagloryuak River (Victoria Island)
- Dolphin and Union Strait
  - Hoppner River
- Coronation Gulf
  - Rae River
  - Richardson River
  - Coppermine River
  - Asiak River
  - Tree River
  - Hood River
  - Kugaryuak River
    - James River
  - Burnside River
    - Mara River
  - Western River
  - Napaaktoktok River
- Dease Strait
  - Ekalluk River
  - Hargrave River
- Queen Maud Gulf
  - Ellice River
  - Perry River (Kuukyuak)
  - Armark River
  - Simpson River
  - McNaughton River
  - Kaleet River
- Rasmussen Basin
  - Back River
    - Bullen River
    - Consul River
    - Baillie River
  - Castor and Pollux River
  - Hayes River
  - Murchison River
- Gulf of Boothia
  - Arrowsmith River
  - Kellett River
  - Curtis River
- Sverdrup Channel
  - Wolf River
- Parry Channel
  - Bacon River

=== Atlantic watershed ===
- Hudson Bay
  - Thlewiaza River
  - Tha-anne River
  - McConnell River
  - Wilson River
  - Kazan River
    - Kunwak River
  - Thelon River
    - Dubawnt River
    - Tammarvi River
  - Quoich River
  - Lorillard River
  - Ferguson River
  - Boas River (Southampton Island)
  - Sutton River (Southampton Island)
  - Ford River (Southampton Island)
  - Copperneedle River
  - Maguse River
- Little Partridge River
- Roes Welcome Sound
  - Borden River
  - Gordon River
  - Snowbank River
- Baffin Bay (Baffin Island)
  - Clyde River
  - Jungersen River
  - Kogalu River
  - McKeond River
- Foxe Basin
  - Aua River
  - Barrow River
  - Cleveland River (Southampton Island)
  - Gifford River (Baffin Island)
  - Rowley River (Baffin Island)
  - Isortog River (Baffin Island)
  - Hantzsch River (Baffin Island)
  - Koukdjuak River (Baffin Island)
    - Isurtuq River
    - Hone River
  - Aukpar River (Baffin Island)
  - Mary River
- Hudson Strait
  - Soper River
- Nares Strait
  - Lake Hazen
    - Turnabout River
    - Ruggles River

== Alphabetical ==
- Amundsen Gulf
- Armark River
- Arrowsmith River
- Asiak River
- Aua River
- Aukpar River
- Back River
- Bacon River
- Baffin Bay
- Baillie River
- Barrow River
- Bloody River
- Boas River
- Borden River
- Bullen River
- Burnside River
- Castor and Pollux River
- Cleveland River
- Clyde River
- Consul River
- Coppermine River
- Copperneedle River
- Coronation Gulf
- Croker River
- Curtis River
- Dease River
- Dease Strait
- Dolphin and Union Strait
- Dubawnt River
- Ekalluk River
- Ellice River
- Ferguson River
- Ford River
- Foxe Basin
- Gifford River
- Gordon River
- Gulf of Boothia
- Hantzsch River
- Harding River
- Hargrave River
- Hayes River
- Hone River
- Hood River
- Hoppner River
- Hornaday River
- Horton River
- Hudson Strait
- Isortog River
- Isurtuq River
- James River
- Jungersen River
- Kagloryuak River
- Kaleet River
- Kazan River
- Kellett River
- Kogalu River
- Koukdjuak River
- Kugaryuak River
- Kunwak River
- Lake Hazen
- Little Partridge River
- Lorillard River
- Maguse River
- Mara River
- Mary River
- McConnell River
- McKeond River
- McNaughton River
- Murchison River
- Nanook River
- Napaaktoktok River
- Nares Strait
- Parry Channel
- Perry River (Kuukyuak)
- Queen Maud Gulf
- Quoich River
- Rae River
- Rasmussen Basin
- Richardson River
- Roes Welcome Sound
- Roscoe River
- Rowley River
- Ruggles River
- Simpson River
- Snowbank River
- Soper River
- Sutton River
- Sverdrup Channel
- Tammarvi River
- Tha-anne River
- Thelon River
- Thlewiaza River
- Tree River
- Turnabout River
- Viscount Melville Sound
- Western River
- Wilson River
- Wolf River

== See also ==
- List of rivers of Canada
