= Nanortut Island =

Island in Nunavut, Canada

- Location within Nunavut Location within Canada

Geography
- Location: Coronation Gulf
- Coordinates: 68°14′N 113°18′W
- Archipelago: Arctic Archipelago

Administration
- Canada
- Territory: Nunavut
- Region: Kitikmeot

Demographics
- Population: Uninhabited

Nanortut Island is an island located within Coronation Gulf, south of Victoria Island, in the Kitikmeot Region, Nunavut, Canada. It is situated at an elevation of 41 m (135 ft) above sea level.

Other islands in the vicinity include Anchor Island, Douglas Island, Duke of York Archipelago, Haodlon Island, Kingak Island, Hatoayok Island, Hokagon Island, Ivonayak Island, Kabviukvik Island, Mangak Island, and Nanukton Island. The community of Kugkluktuk (formerly Coppermine) is located on the mainland, 92.7 km (57.6 mi) to the south.
