= Blaze Island =

Island in Nunavut, Canada

- Location within Nunavut Location within Canada

Geography
- Location: Coronation Gulf
- Coordinates: 67°52′35″N 115°10′50″W
- Archipelago: Arctic Archipelago

Administration
- Canada
- Territory: Nunavut
- Region: Kitikmeot

Demographics
- Population: Uninhabited

Blaze Island is an island located at the western end of Richardson Bay in Coronation Gulf, and south of Victoria Island, in the Kitikmeot Region, Nunavut, Canada.

Other islands in the vicinity include Kigirktaryuk Island, Onitkok Island, Seven Mile Island, as well as the Couper Islands and the Nichols Islands. The community of Kugluktuk (formerly Coppermine) is located on the mainland, 6.9 km (4.3 mi) to the southwest.
