= Nichols Islands =

Island group in Nunavut, Canada

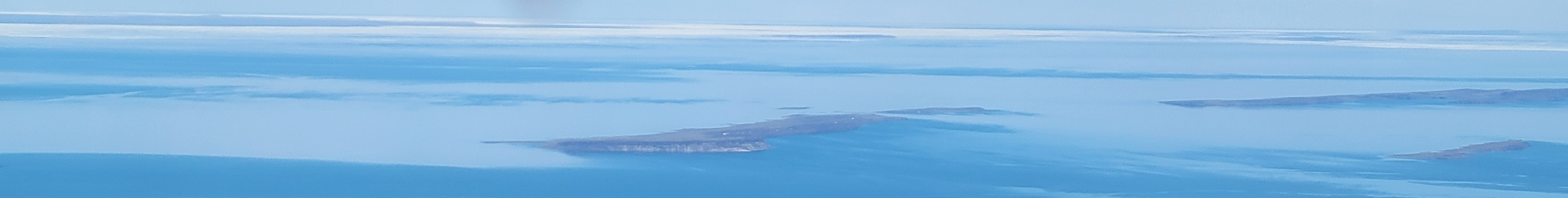
- Eastern part of Nichols Islands

- Location within Nunavut Location within Canada

Geography
- Location: Coronation Gulf
- Coordinates: 67°53′39″N 115°07′59″W
- Archipelago: Arctic Archipelago

Administration
- Canada
- Territory: Nunavut
- Region: Kitikmeot

Demographics
- Population: Uninhabited

The Nichols Islands are an island group located inside western Coronation Gulf, south of Victoria Island, in the Kitikmeot Region, Nunavut, Canada. Other islands in the vicinity include Blaze Island, Seven Mile Island, Kigirktaryuk Island, Onitkok Island, and the Couper Islands.

The community of Kugkluktuk (formerly Coppermine) is located 8 km (5.0 mi) to the southwest.
