= Doak Island =

Island in Nunavut, Canada

- Location within Nunavut Location within Canada

Geography
- Location: Coronation Gulf
- Coordinates: 68°23′N 111°26′W
- Archipelago: Canadian Arctic Archipelago

Administration
- Canada
- Territory: Nunavut
- Region: Kitikmeot

Demographics
- Population: Uninhabited

Doak Island is an island located within Coronation Gulf, south of Victoria Island, in the Kitikmeot Region, Nunavut, Canada. It is approximately 4 m (13 ft) above sea level.

It was named after Corporal William Andrew Doak, a member of the Royal Canadian Mounted Police. Doak was killed by his Inuit prisoner, Alikomiak, in 1922 at Kugluktuk. Alikomiak and his fellow prisoner Tatimagana were the first Inuit to be executed for murder under Canadian law.

Other islands in the vicinity include Bate Island, Murray Island, Edinburgh Island, and Takhoalok Island, as well as the Sesqui Islands.
