= Hokagon Island =

Island within Coronation Gulf, Canada

- Location within Nunavut Location within Canada

Geography
- Location: Coronation Gulf
- Coordinates: 68°15′N 113°13′W
- Archipelago: Canadian Arctic Archipelago

Administration
- Canada
- Territory: Nunavut
- Region: Kitikmeot

Demographics
- Population: Uninhabited

Hokagon Island is an island located within Coronation Gulf, south of Victoria Island, in the Kitikmeot Region, Nunavut, Canada.

Other islands in the vicinity include Anchor Island, Douglas Island, Duke of York Archipelago, Haodlon Island, Hatoayok Island, Ivonayak Island, Kabviukvik Island, Kingak Island, Mangak Island, Nanortut Island, Nanukton Island, and Takhoalok Island. The community of Kugkluktuk (formerly Coppermine) is located on the mainland, 96.8 km (60.1 mi) to the south.
