= Nanukton Island =

Island in Nunavut, Canada

- Location within Nunavut Location within Canada

Geography
- Location: Coronation Gulf
- Coordinates: 68°09′N 112°49′W
- Archipelago: Arctic Archipelago

Administration
- Canada
- Territory: Nunavut
- Region: Kitikmeot

Demographics
- Population: Uninhabited

Nanukton Island is an island located within Coronation Gulf, south of Victoria Island, in the Kitikmeot Region, Nunavut, Canada. It is situated at an elevation of 30 m (98 ft) above sea level.

Other islands in the vicinity include Anchor Island, Duke of York Archipelago, Haodlon Island, Hatoayok Island, Hokagon Island, Kabviukvik Island, Kingak Island, Mangak Island, Nanortut Island, and Takhoalok Island.
