= Takhoalok Island =

Island in Nunavut, Canada

- Location within Nunavut Location within Canada

Geography
- Location: Coronation Gulf
- Coordinates: 68°10′N 112°08′W
- Archipelago: Arctic Archipelago

Administration
- Canada
- Territory: Nunavut
- Region: Kitikmeot

Demographics
- Population: Uninhabited

Takhoalok Island is an island located within Coronation Gulf, south of Victoria Island, in the Kitikmeot Region, Nunavut, Canada. Its highest point is 48 m (157 ft) above sea level.

Other islands in the vicinity include Anchor Island, Duke of York Archipelago, Hokagon Island, Doak Island, Kingak Island, Mangak Island, and Nanukton Island.
