= Aiyohok Islands =

Island group in Nunavut, Canada

- Location within Nunavut Location within Canada

Geography
- Location: Coronation Gulf
- Coordinates: 68°25′N 112°32′W

Administration
- Canada
- Territory: Nunavut
- Region: Kitikmeot

Demographics
- Population: Uninhabited

The Aiyohok Islands are an island group located in the Coronation Gulf, south of Victoria Island, in the Kitikmeot Region, Nunavut, Canada. Other island groups in the vicinity include the Akvitlak Islands, Black Berry Islands, Duke of York Archipelago, Miles Islands, Nauyan Islands, Outcast Islands, and Sisters Islands.
