= Lady Franklin Point =

Landform in the Canadian Arctic territory of Nunavut

- Headland
- Coordinates: 68°29′N 113°15′W
- Location: Victoria Island, Nunavut, Canada
- Offshore water bodies: Coronation Gulf, Dolphin and Union Strait

Lady Franklin Point is a landform in the Canadian Arctic territory of Nunavut. It is located on southwestern Victoria Island in the Coronation Gulf by Austin Bay at the eastern entrance of Dolphin and Union Strait.

The point is uninhabited but still had an active North Warning System. Originally part of the Distant Early Warning Line in the Northwest Territories, the site is known as PIN-3. On 10 January 2000, the unmanned site caught fire and was almost totally destroyed.

Named after Jane Griffin, Lady Franklin, it was the historical area of Nagyuktogmiut, a Copper Inuit subgroup.

== Climate ==
Climate data for Lady Franklin Point (Lady Franklin Point Airport) WMO ID: 71937; coordinates 68°30′N 113°13′W; elevation: 15.9 m (52 ft); 1971–2000 normals
Month	Jan	Feb	Mar	Apr	May	Jun	Jul	Aug	Sep	Oct	Nov	Dec	Year
Record high humidex	−5.4	−5.0	−7.1	4.0	6.0	16.5	23.8	20.9	13.5	6.1	−1.0	−4.3	23.8
Record high °C (°F)	−4.4 (24.1)	−4.4 (24.1)	−4.4 (24.1)	5.2 (41.4)	9.2 (48.6)	18.0 (64.4)	22.8 (73.0)	21.1 (70.0)	13.9 (57.0)	6.1 (43.0)	14.4 (57.9)	−4.0 (24.8)	22.8 (73.0)
Mean daily maximum °C (°F)	−25.1 (−13.2)	−26.6 (−15.9)	−23.6 (−10.5)	−14.4 (6.1)	−3.4 (25.9)	5.7 (42.3)	10.4 (50.7)	9.0 (48.2)	3.4 (38.1)	−4.6 (23.7)	−16.5 (2.3)	−23.1 (−9.6)	−9.1 (15.7)
Daily mean °C (°F)	−28.6 (−19.5)	−30.1 (−22.2)	−27.4 (−17.3)	−18.8 (−1.8)	−6.9 (19.6)	2.8 (37.0)	6.8 (44.2)	6.3 (43.3)	1.4 (34.5)	−7.3 (18.9)	−20.0 (−4.0)	−26.5 (−15.7)	−12.4 (9.8)
Mean daily minimum °C (°F)	−32.3 (−26.1)	−33.7 (−28.7)	−31.2 (−24.2)	−23.1 (−9.6)	−10.5 (13.1)	−0.1 (31.8)	3.1 (37.6)	3.6 (38.5)	−0.6 (30.9)	−10.0 (14.0)	−23.5 (−10.3)	−29.8 (−21.6)	−15.7 (3.8)
Record low °C (°F)	−46.1 (−51.0)	−45.6 (−50.1)	−44.4 (−47.9)	−41.5 (−42.7)	−27.5 (−17.5)	−14.4 (6.1)	−3.3 (26.1)	−3.0 (26.6)	−13.1 (8.4)	−30.2 (−22.4)	−37.8 (−36.0)	−44.4 (−47.9)	−46.1 (−51.0)
Record low wind chill	−67.4	−62.9	−62.0	−56.0	−38.3	−21.2	−8.4	−9.4	−20.3	−40.8	−50.0	−57.5	−67.4
Average precipitation mm (inches)	4.7 (0.19)	4.8 (0.19)	4.2 (0.17)	4.4 (0.17)	5.0 (0.20)	10.8 (0.43)	20.6 (0.81)	20.6 (0.81)	19.5 (0.77)	16.1 (0.63)	6.4 (0.25)	4.2 (0.17)	121.2 (4.77)
Average rainfall mm (inches)	0.0 (0.0)	0.0 (0.0)	0.0 (0.0)	0.0 (0.0)	1.5 (0.06)	9.4 (0.37)	20.6 (0.81)	19.9 (0.78)	14.8 (0.58)	0.9 (0.04)	0.0 (0.0)	0.0 (0.0)	67.0 (2.64)
Average snowfall cm (inches)	4.7 (1.9)	4.8 (1.9)	4.2 (1.7)	4.4 (1.7)	3.5 (1.4)	1.4 (0.6)	0.0 (0.0)	0.8 (0.3)	4.7 (1.9)	15.3 (6.0)	6.4 (2.5)	4.2 (1.7)	54.3 (21.4)
Average precipitation days	3.4	3	3.3	3.7	3.6	3.6	7.0	8.2	8.1	8.5	4.8	4.0	61.0
Average rainy days	0.0	0.0	0.0	0.05	0.77	2.9	7.0	8.1	5.5	0.67	0.0	0.0	24.8
Average snowy days	3.4	3.0	3.3	3.6	2.9	0.95	0.0	0.45	3.0	8.0	4.8	4.0	37.4
Source: 1971-2000 Environment and Climate Change Canada
