= Kabviukvik Island =

Island in Nunavut, Canada

Native name: Kabviukvik
- Location within Nunavut Location within Canada

Geography
- Location: Coronation Gulf
- Coordinates: 68°11′N 113°13′W
- Archipelago: Arctic Archipelago

Administration
- Canada
- Territory: Nunavut
- Region: Kitikmeot

Demographics
- Population: Uninhabited

Kabviukvik Island is an island located within Coronation Gulf, south of Victoria Island, in the Kitikmeot Region, Nunavut, Canada.

Other islands in the vicinity include Anchor Island, Douglas Island, Duke of York Archipelago, Haodlon Island, Hatoayok Island, Hokagon Island, Ivonayak Island, Kingak Island, Mangak Island, Nanortut Island, and Nanukton Island. The community of Kugkluktuk (formerly Coppermine) is located on the mainland, 93.1 km (57.8 mi) to the south.
