= Austin Bay =

Bay in Nunavut, Canada

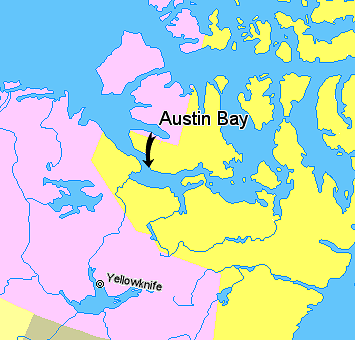
Austin Bay, Nunavut, Canada.
Nunavut
Northwest Territories
- Location within Canada
- Location: Dolphin and Union Strait
- Coordinates: 68°33′N 113°10′W
- Basin countries: Canada
- Settlements: Uninhabited

Austin Bay is an Arctic waterway in the Kitikmeot Region, Nunavut, Canada. It is located in Dolphin and Union Strait, by southwestern Victoria Island. It is separated from the Coronation Gulf by a small peninsula. Lady Franklin Point is located at the southwest point of the bay.

== Climate ==
Climate data is from Lady Franklin Point.

Climate data for Lady Franklin Point (Lady Franklin Point Airport) WMO ID: 71937; coordinates 68°30′N 113°13′W; elevation: 15.9 m (52 ft); 1971–2000 normals, extremes 1957–1993
| Month | Jan | Feb | Mar | Apr | May | Jun | Jul | Aug | Sep | Oct | Nov | Dec | Year |
|---|---|---|---|---|---|---|---|---|---|---|---|---|---|
| Record high humidex | −5.4 | −5.0 | −7.1 | 4.0 | 6.0 | 16.5 | 23.8 | 20.9 | 13.5 | 6.1 | −1.0 | −4.3 | 23.8 |
| Record high °C (°F) | −4.4 (24.1) | −4.4 (24.1) | −4.4 (24.1) | 5.2 (41.4) | 9.2 (48.6) | 18.0 (64.4) | 22.8 (73.0) | 21.1 (70.0) | 13.9 (57.0) | 6.1 (43.0) | 14.4 (57.9) | −4.0 (24.8) | 22.8 (73.0) |
| Mean daily maximum °C (°F) | −25.1 (−13.2) | −26.6 (−15.9) | −23.6 (−10.5) | −14.4 (6.1) | −3.4 (25.9) | 5.7 (42.3) | 10.4 (50.7) | 9.0 (48.2) | 3.4 (38.1) | −4.6 (23.7) | −16.5 (2.3) | −23.1 (−9.6) | −9.1 (15.7) |
| Daily mean °C (°F) | −28.6 (−19.5) | −30.1 (−22.2) | −27.4 (−17.3) | −18.8 (−1.8) | −6.9 (19.6) | 2.8 (37.0) | 6.8 (44.2) | 6.3 (43.3) | 1.4 (34.5) | −7.3 (18.9) | −20.0 (−4.0) | −26.5 (−15.7) | −12.4 (9.8) |
| Mean daily minimum °C (°F) | −32.3 (−26.1) | −33.7 (−28.7) | −31.2 (−24.2) | −23.1 (−9.6) | −10.5 (13.1) | −0.1 (31.8) | 3.1 (37.6) | 3.6 (38.5) | −0.6 (30.9) | −10.0 (14.0) | −23.5 (−10.3) | −29.8 (−21.6) | −15.7 (3.8) |
| Record low °C (°F) | −46.1 (−51.0) | −45.6 (−50.1) | −44.4 (−47.9) | −41.5 (−42.7) | −27.5 (−17.5) | −14.4 (6.1) | −3.3 (26.1) | −3.0 (26.6) | −13.1 (8.4) | −30.2 (−22.4) | −37.8 (−36.0) | −44.4 (−47.9) | −46.1 (−51.0) |
| Record low wind chill | −67.4 | −62.9 | −62.0 | −56.0 | −38.3 | −21.2 | −8.4 | −9.4 | −20.3 | −40.8 | −50.0 | −57.5 | −67.4 |
| Average precipitation mm (inches) | 4.7 (0.19) | 4.8 (0.19) | 4.2 (0.17) | 4.4 (0.17) | 5.0 (0.20) | 10.8 (0.43) | 20.6 (0.81) | 20.6 (0.81) | 19.5 (0.77) | 16.1 (0.63) | 6.4 (0.25) | 4.2 (0.17) | 121.2 (4.77) |
| Average rainfall mm (inches) | 0.0 (0.0) | 0.0 (0.0) | 0.0 (0.0) | 0.0 (0.0) | 1.5 (0.06) | 9.4 (0.37) | 20.6 (0.81) | 19.9 (0.78) | 14.8 (0.58) | 0.9 (0.04) | 0.0 (0.0) | 0.0 (0.0) | 67.0 (2.64) |
| Average snowfall cm (inches) | 4.7 (1.9) | 4.8 (1.9) | 4.2 (1.7) | 4.4 (1.7) | 3.5 (1.4) | 1.4 (0.6) | 0.0 (0.0) | 0.8 (0.3) | 4.7 (1.9) | 15.3 (6.0) | 6.4 (2.5) | 4.2 (1.7) | 54.3 (21.4) |
| Average precipitation days | 3.4 | 3 | 3.3 | 3.7 | 3.6 | 3.6 | 7.0 | 8.2 | 8.1 | 8.5 | 4.8 | 4.0 | 61.0 |
| Average rainy days | 0.0 | 0.0 | 0.0 | 0.05 | 0.77 | 2.9 | 7.0 | 8.1 | 5.5 | 0.67 | 0.0 | 0.0 | 24.8 |
| Average snowy days | 3.4 | 3.0 | 3.3 | 3.6 | 2.9 | 0.95 | 0.0 | 0.45 | 3.0 | 8.0 | 4.8 | 4.0 | 37.4 |
Source: 1971-2000 Environment and Climate Change Canada
