= Tasialuk =

Land-locked freshwater Arctic fjord

- Shoreline of Tasialuk with gigantic lakeside peaks
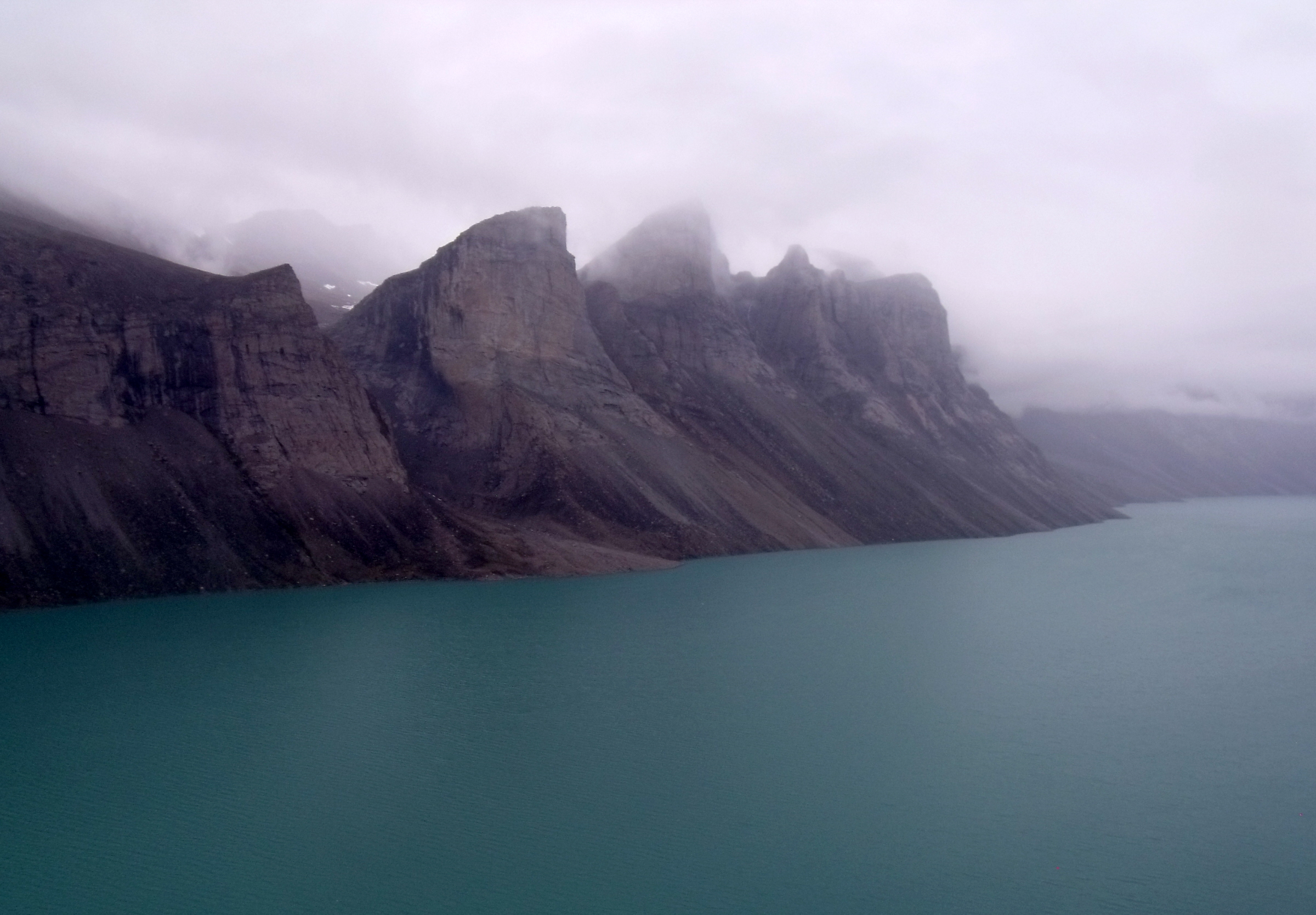

- Location in Nunavut
- Location: Baffin Island
- Coordinates: 70°25′33″N 70°07′01″W
- Type: Fjord
- Primary outflows: Kuugaaluk
- Ocean/sea sources: Baffin Bay
- Basin countries: Canada
- Max. length: 60 km (37 mi)
- Max. width: 3 km (1.9 mi)

Tasialuk (Inuktitut syllabics: ᑕᓯᐊᓗᒃ) formerly Ayr Lake is a land-locked freshwater lake, structurally a fjord, on Baffin Island's northeastern coast in the Qikiqtaaluk Region of Nunavut, Canada. The Inuit settlement of Pond Inlet is 360 km (220 mi) to the northwest and Clyde River is 35 km (22 mi) to the east.

== Geography ==
Tasialuk is located east of the Kangiqtualuk Uqquqti and Arviqtujuq Kangiqtua fjords. It stretches roughly from the northeast to the southwest for about 60 km (37 mi). The Kuugaaluk flows out of the northern end of the lake and discharges its waters in the Baffin Bay a further 40 km (25 mi) to the northeast.

There are spectacular landscapes in Tasialuk, with massive nearly 1,400 m (4,600 ft) high summits rising their ramparts close to the shore, especially in its central part. In the inner area the Ayr Pass connects with the Arviqtujuq Kangiqtua to the west.

== See also ==
- List of lakes of Nunavut
- List of lakes of Canada
