= Ukpik Peak =

Mountain in Nunavut, Canada

- Location within Nunavut

Highest point
- Elevation: 1,809 m (5,935 ft)
- Prominence: 1,650 m (5,410 ft)
- Listing: Canada prominent peaks 93rd
- Coordinates: 70°41′10″N 71°19′10″W

Geography
- Location: Baffin Island, Nunavut, Canada
- Parent range: Baffin Mountains
- Topo map: NTS 27F12 (untitled)

Ukpik Peak is a mountain associated with the Baffin Mountains on Baffin Island, Nunavut, Canada.

== Geography ==
Ukpik Peak is located at the southern end of the Remote Peninsula between the Stewart Valley and Sam Ford Fiord.

At 1,809 m (5,935 ft) it is the twenty-eighth-highest peak in Nunavut and the eighth-highest peak in the territory by topographic prominence. However, it is not as conspicuous as Sail Peaks rising 4.5 km (2.8 mi) to the northwest facing Stewart Valley.
