= Duke of York Group =

The 'Duke of York Group may refer to:

- Atafu, Tokelau was named Duke of York Group under British colonization.
- Duke of York Archipelago, Canada
- Duke of York Islands, New Guinea
