= Richardson River =

Richardson River may refer to:

- Richardson River (Canada)
- Richardson River (Victoria) in Australia
