= Napaaktoktok River =

Coordinates: 67°49′02″N 114°44′11″W

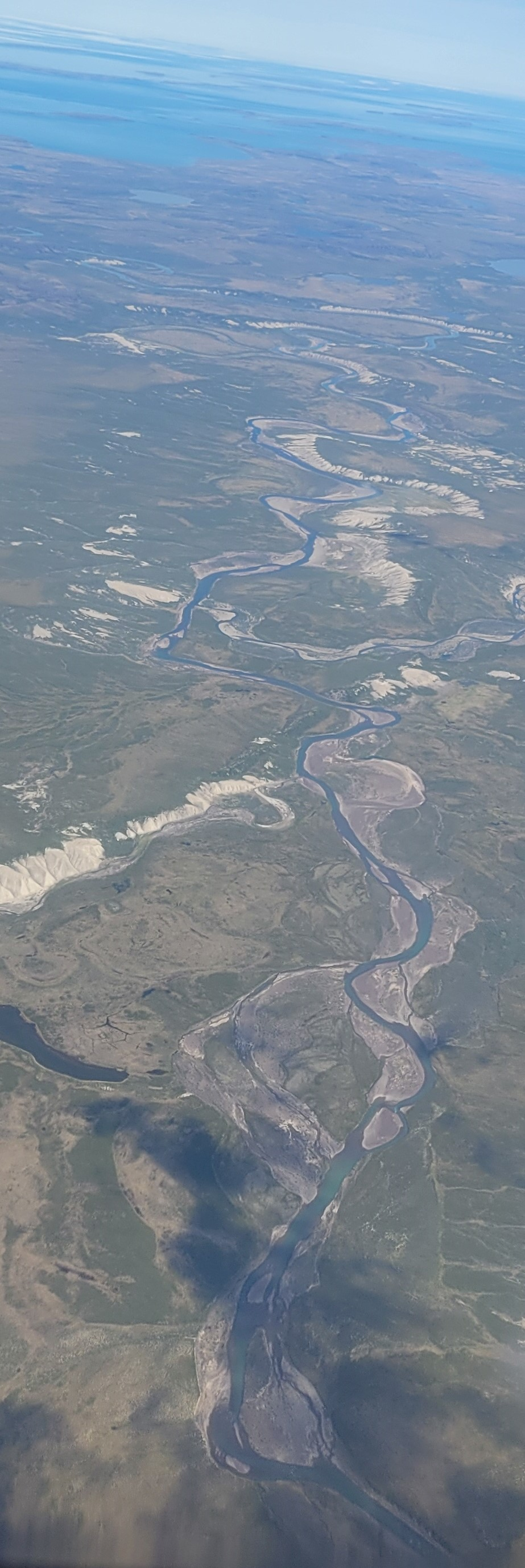
- Napaaktoktok River, facing east

Location
- Country: Canada
- Territory: Nunavut

Physical characteristics
- Mouth
  - location: Coronation Gulf
  - elevation: 0 m (0 ft)
- Basin size: Arctic Ocean

The Napaaktoktok River is a waterway in the Kitikmeot region of Nunavut in Canada. It flows generally north to Coronation Gulf, an arm of the Arctic Ocean. The Napaaktoktok runs parallel to the Coppermine River, 14.4 km (8.9 mi) to the west, and the Asiak River, 15.2 km (9.4 mi) to the east.

The community of Kugluktuk (formerly Coppermine) is located at the mouth of the Coppermine River, approximately 15.7 km (9.8 mi) to the west.

== See also ==
- List of rivers of Nunavut
