= Remote Peninsula =

Peninsula in Nunavut, Canada

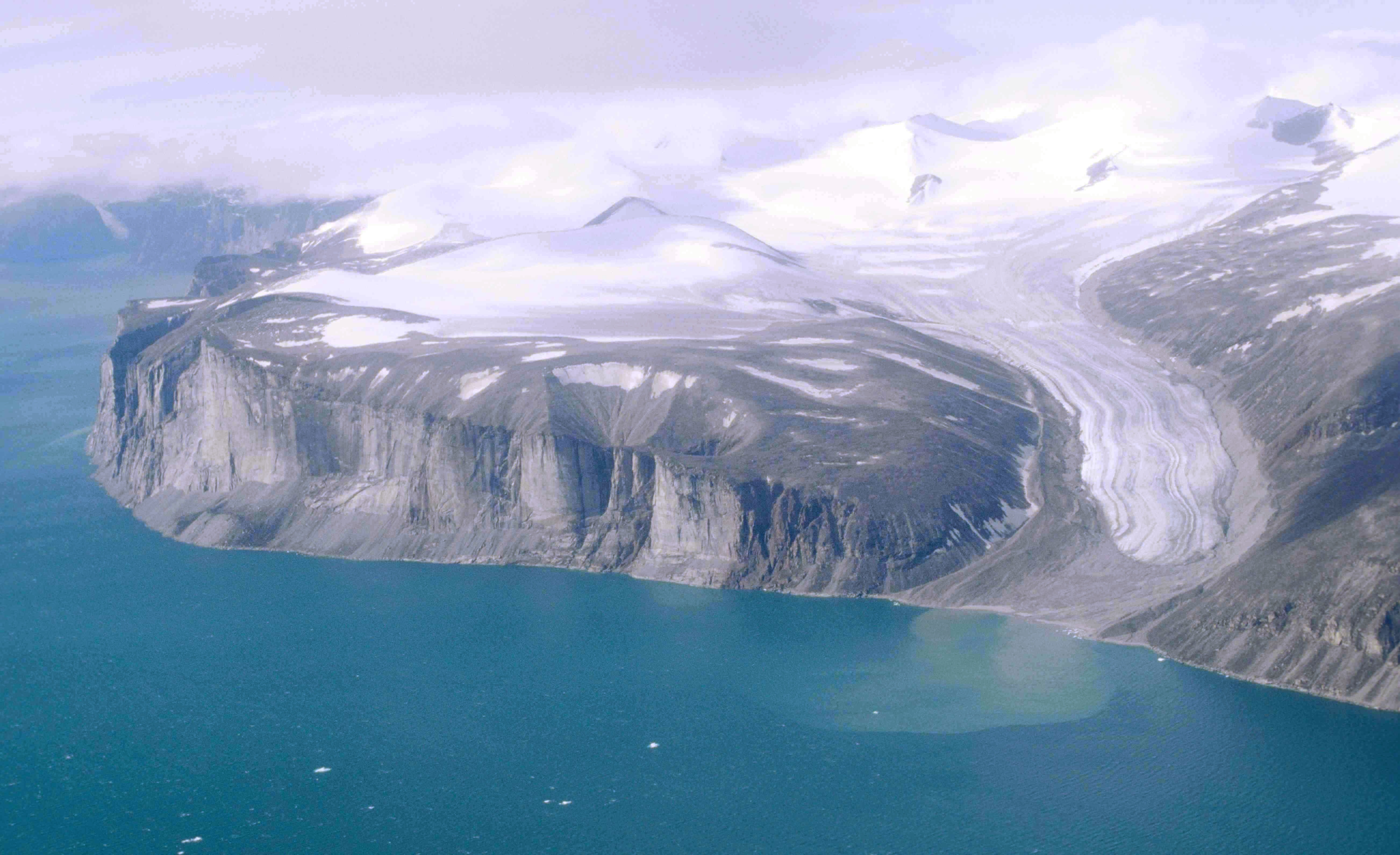
- Eastern shore of the Remote Peninsula a few miles south of Hangover Hill

- Location within Nunavut

Geography
- Location: Baffin Island
- Coordinates: 70°50′N 70°55′W
- Adjacent to: Gibbs Fiord; Baffin Bay; Sam Ford Fiord
- Length: 61 km (37.9 mi)
- Width: 27 km (16.8 mi)
- Highest elevation: 1,809 m (5935 ft)
- Highest point: Ukpik Peak

Administration
- Canada
- Territory: Nunavut

Demographics
- Population: 0

The Remote Peninsula is a peninsula located on the eastern coast of Baffin Island. It is part of the Qikiqtaaluk Region of the Canadian territory of Nunavut. The Inuit settlement of Pond Inlet is 295 km (183 mi) to the northwest and Clyde River is 90 km (56 mi) to the southeast.

== Geography ==
The Remote Peninsula extends northwards into the Baffin Bay from the island's mainland. It is bounded by Gibbs Fiord and the Stewart Valley in the east, the Baffin Bay in the north, Sam Ford Fiord in the east, and in the south by Walker Arm, the latter fjord's offshoot. The peninsula is attached to the mainland by a narrow isthmus in the southwest.

The Remote Peninsula is approximately 61 km (38 mi) long and has a maximum width of 27 km (17 mi). It is mountainous and has many active glaciers. Its highest point is Ukpik Peak, a 1,809 m (5,935 ft) high prominent summit. Other noteworthy mountains include the formidable-looking Sail Peaks facing Stewart Valley, and also Tiiturvik Peak, Nauttiaq Peak, Qablunaaq Peak, Aglu Peak, Mount Longstaff, Nallaqtaq Peak and Atqut Ridge —all located in the southern and SW area of the peninsula, as well as Hangover Hill in the east.

The Remote Lake is an isolated 10 m deep lake in the northeast of the peninsula where a phenomenon of unnatural warming has been detected. Other noteworthy geographic features of the peninsula include Cape Come Again (Qaqulluit Nuvua) —its northernmost headland, and Refuge Harbour in the west.

== Bibliography ==
- D. Ives, Jack; T. Buckley, Jane (1969). "Glacial Geomorphology of Remote Peninsula, Baffin Island, N.W.T., Canada". Arctic and Alpine Research. 1 (2). INSTAAR, University of Colorado: 83–95. doi:10.2307/1550015. JSTOR 1550015.
