= Cape Hewett =

Peninsula in Nunavut, Canada

Coordinates: 70.255°N 67.780°W

Cape Hewett is a peninsula on eastern Baffin Island, Qikiqtaaluk Region, Nunavut, Canada. Located on Baffin Bay near Clyde Inlet, the closest settlement is Clyde River, 39.6 kilometres (24.6 mi) away.
