= Tunnunik impact structure =

Meteorite impact structure in Canada

- Prince Albert impact crater

- Location within Northwest Territories Location within Canada
- Location: Prince Albert Peninsula, Northwest Territories, Canada; 72°28′N 113°56′W

Impact crater structure
- Confidence: Confirmed
- Diameter: ~25 km (16 mi)
- Age: ~450–430 million years
- Exposed: Yes

The Tunnunik impact structure, formerly known as the Prince Albert Impact Crater, is a recently confirmed meteorite impact structure. It is located on Prince Albert Peninsula in the northwestern part of Victoria Island^{[A]} in Canada's Northwest Territories.

The 25 km (16 mi) wide structure was discovered in 2010 by Brian Pratt, professor of geology at the University of Saskatchewan, and Keith Dewing of the Geological Survey of Canada during an aerial survey of the region. The structure is estimated to have formed between 450 and 430 million years ago, during the Ordovician period, based mainly on paleomagnetic analysis. It is estimated that it was created when a meteor a few kilometres in diameter struck the Earth. The desert-like landscape of impact structure like Tunnunik can be useful in understanding the geology of other rocky planets such as Mars.

It is Canada's 30th known meteorite impact feature.

== Notes ==
^[A] Not to be confused with the unconfirmed Victoria Island structure in California, United States.
