= Ayr Pass =

Mountain pass in Nunavut, Canada

- Location within Nunavut
- Elevation: 252 metres (827 ft)

Third Approach
- Location: Baffin Island
- Range: Baffin Mountains
- Coordinates: 70°29′3″N 70°12′50″W
- Topo map: NTS 27F6 (untitled)

Ayr Pass is a mountain pass in the central Baffin Mountains, Nunavut, Canada.

It is located between the central part of the Ayr Lake and the Eglinton Fiord, east of the Sam Ford Fiord.

== See also ==
- Revoir Pass
