= George Forneret =

Canadian Anglican priest

George Augustus Forneret (b Berthierville 23 September 1851 - Hamilton, Ontario 28 Aug 1925) was a Canadian Anglican priest.

Rigby was educated at McGill University and ordained in 1876. After a curacy at Montreal Cathedral he was an SPG missionary on the Prince Albert Peninsula. He held incumbencies at Dunham, Dundas and Hamilton. He was Archdeacon of Wellington, ON from 1907 to 1911; and Archdeacon of Niagara from 1911 until his death.
