= Hargrave River (Nunavut) =

River in Nunavut, Canada

- Location of the mouth of the Hargrave River in Nunavut

Location
- Country: Canada
- Territory: Nunavut
- Region: Kitikmeot

Physical characteristics
- Mouth: Dease Strait
  - coordinates: 68°40′00″N 107°35′00″W
  - elevation: 0 m (0 ft)

Basin features
- River system: Arctic Ocean drainage basin

The Hargrave River is a river in the Arctic Ocean drainage basin in Kitikmeot Region, Nunavut, Canada. It is on the Kent Peninsula, and has its mouth on Dease Strait.

== See also ==
- List of rivers of Nunavut
