= Sutton Island (Nunavut) =

Island in Nunavut, Canada

Geography
- Location: Arctic Canada
- Coordinates: 68°55′N 114°18′W
- Archipelago: Arctic Archipelago

Administration
- Canada
- Territory: Nunavut
- Region: Kitikmeot

Sutton Island is located in northern Canada's territory of Nunavut. It is situated in the Dolphin and Union Strait immediately next to Liston Island. Rymer Point and Simpson Bay, on Victoria Island's Wollaston Peninsula are to the northeast. Bernard Harbour, on the mainland, is to the southwest, as is Chantrey Island.

The island is the ancestral home of several Inuit including the Puiplirmiut (or Puiblirmiut) and Noahonirmiut, Copper Inuit subgroups.
