= Hatoayok Island =

Island in Nunavut, Canada

- Location within Nunavut Location within Canada

Geography
- Location: Coronation Gulf
- Coordinates: 68°13′N 113°30′W
- Archipelago: Canadian Arctic Archipelago

Administration
- Canada
- Territory: Nunavut
- Region: Kitikmeot

Demographics
- Population: Uninhabited

Hatoayok Island is an island located within Coronation Gulf, south of Victoria Island, in the Kitikmeot Region, Nunavut, Canada.

Other islands in the vicinity include Anchor Island, Douglas Island, Haodlon Island, Hokagon Island, Ivonayak Island, Kabviukvik Island, Mangak Island, Nanortut Island, and Nanukton Island. The community of Kugkluktuk (formerly Coppermine) is located on the mainland, 84.4 km (52.4 mi) to the south.
