= Outcast Islands (Nunavut) =

Island group in Nunavut, Canada

- Location within Nunavut Location within Canada

Geography
- Location: Coronation Gulf
- Coordinates: 68°26′N 112°28′W

Administration
- Canada
- Territory: Nunavut
- Region: Kitikmeot

Demographics
- Population: Uninhabited

The Outcast Islands are an island group located in the Coronation Gulf, south of Victoria Island, in the Kitikmeot Region, Nunavut, Canada. Other island groups in the vicinity include the Aiyohok Islands, Akvitlak Islands, Miles Islands, Nauyan Islands, and Sisters Islands.
