= Richardson River (Canada) =

Location
- Country: Canada
- Territory: Nunavut

Physical characteristics
- Mouth
  - location: Coronation Gulf
  - coordinates: 67.909026235°N 115.52546122°W
  - elevation: Sea level

The Richardson River is a waterway that flows into Richardson Bay, Coronation Gulf in the northern Canadian territory of Nunavut. Its mouth is situated northwest of Kugluktuk, Nunavut. The Rae River is 1.3 km (0.81 mi) away.

The Richardson River is named in honour of Sir John Richardson, a Scottish naval surgeon, naturalist and arctic explorer of the region.

== See also ==
- List of rivers of Nunavut
