= Wolf River (Nunavut) =

River in Nunavut Province, Canada

- Location of mouth

Location
- Country: Canada
- Territory: Nunavut

Physical characteristics
- Source
  - coordinates: 79°26′52″N 90°56′12″W
  - elevation: 838 m (2,749 ft)
- Mouth: Arctic Ocean
  - coordinates: 79°23′00″N 91°07′00″W
  - elevation: 0 m (0 ft)

Basin features
- River system: Arctic Ocean drainage basin

The Wolf River is a river on Axel Heiberg Island in Qikiqtaaluk Region, Nunavut, Canada. It flows to the Arctic Ocean.

The river begins at Black Crown Glacier on the slopes of Wolf Mountain, flows south, then turns southwest to reach its mouth at Expedition Fjord, adjacent to the mouth of the Expedition River. Expedition Fjord connects via Strand Bay and the Sverdrup Channel to the Arctic Ocean.

== See also ==
- List of rivers of Nunavut
- List of rivers of the Americas by coastline
