= Tasiujaq (Inugsuin Fiord) =

Bay in Nunavut, Canada

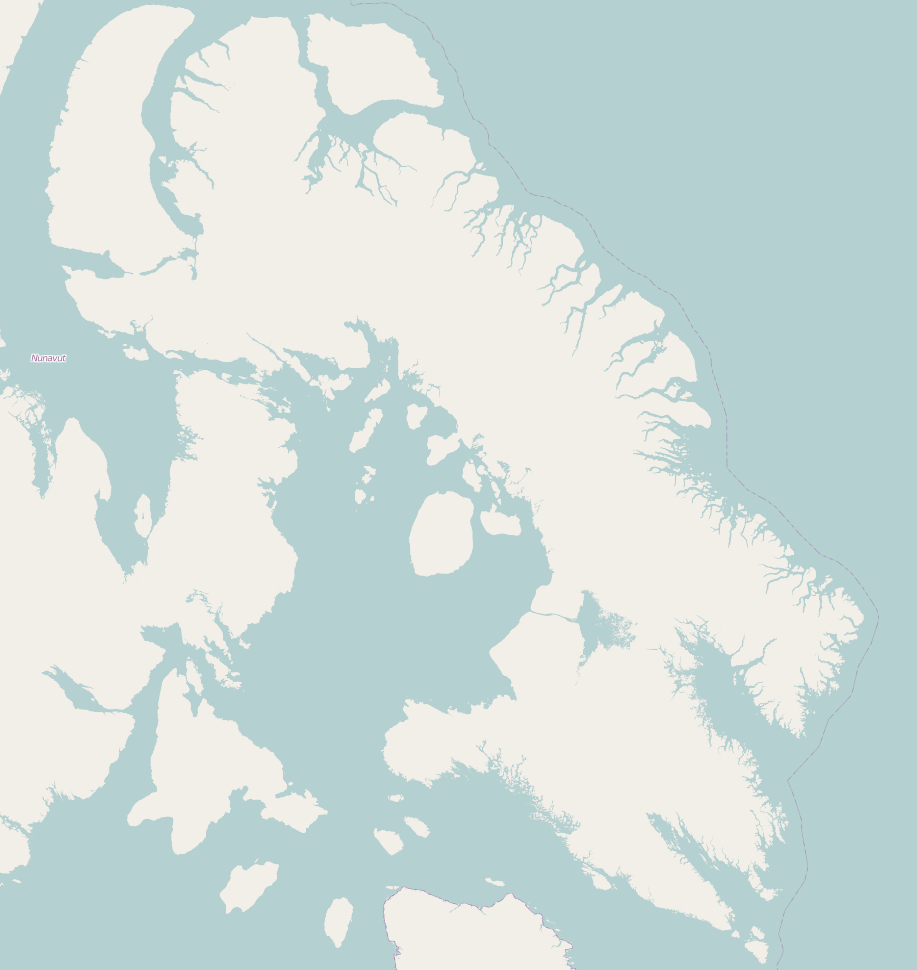
- Location within Baffin Island Location within Nunavut Location within Canada
- Location: Kangiqtugaapik
- Coordinates: 70°09′52″N 68°19′09″W
- Ocean/sea sources: Arctic Ocean
- Basin countries: Canada
- Settlements: Uninhabited

Tasiujaq, formerly Igloo Bay, is an uninhabited bay of Baffin Island in the Qikiqtaaluk Region, Nunavut, Canada. It flows into Inugsuin Fiord and then into Kangiqtugaapik and onto Davis Strait. The community of Clyde River is located 35 km (22 mi) northwest.
