= Kaleet River =

River in Nunavut, Canada

The Kaleet River is one of the lakes in Canada. It effectively starts north of Lower Macdougall Lake in the Kitikmeot Region, Nunavut, Canada just east of Joe Lake, 66°16′31″N 098°20′13″W. It is a small, silty river constituting the eastern boundary of the Queen Maud Gulf Bird Sanctuary. It is a main feeder river to Sherman Basin, 67°46′59″N 097°34′59″W, at its final outlet. There is evidence of earlier Inuit presence in the form of inuksuit. There is also evidence of a more modern presence in the form of cairns. There is at least one cabin on the north side of the Kaleet, as it widens entering Sherman Basin.

== See also ==
- List of rivers of Nunavut
