= Bernard Harbour =

Abandoned settlement and bay in Nunavut, Canada

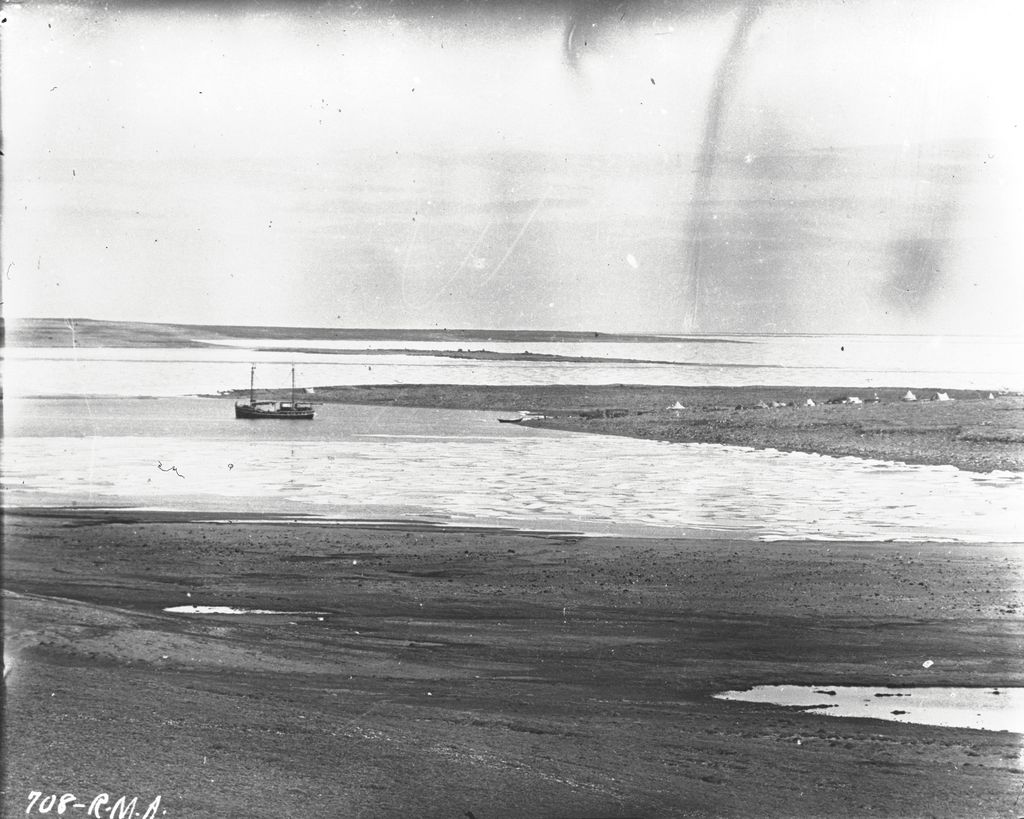

- Location within Nunavut
- Location: Nunavut, Canada
- Coordinates: 68°46′00″N 114°42′00″W
- Type: Bay
- Part of: Dolphin and Union Strait
- Islands: Chantry Island

Bernard Harbour (Inuit: Nulahugiuq) is a bay on the mainland of Nunavut, Canada. It is situated on Dolphin and Union Strait, southwest of Sutton Island. The closest inhabited community is Kugluktuk, about 100 km (62 mi) south of Bernard Harbour.

At one time, it was the site of a Hudson's Bay Company trading post. It is also a former Distant Early Warning Line (PIN-C) and current North Warning System site. As of August 2004, there were several abandoned structures remaining at the site.

The butterfly Colias johanseni is found in the area.

== Geography ==
Bernard Harbour is a bay that recedes southwestward about 3.2 kilometres (2 mi) from an entrance that is about 8.0 kilometres (5 mi) wide. Chantry Island and a smaller island extend nearly across the entrance of the bay. The mainland shore of the bay consists of numerous stony points and intervening bights, with beaches of sand or gravel, behind which the land, within a distance of 3.2 kilometres (2 mi), is intersected by many ravines and rises to elevations of 37 metres (120 ft).

The harbour is well sheltered and can accommodate ships up to 6.1 m (20 ft) in draught.

== History ==
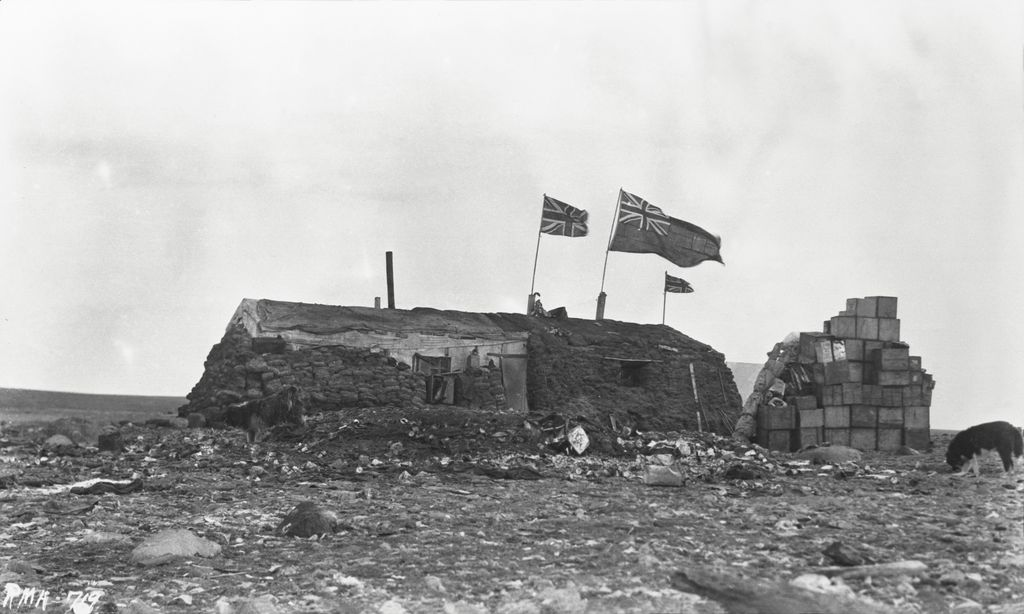
CAE house at Bernard Harbour, July 1916

From 1913 to 1916, Bernard Harbour was the base of the southern party of the Canadian Arctic Expedition (CAE), led by Rudolph Martin Anderson. It was named by Anderson in 1914 after Captain Joseph F. Bernard.

In 1916, a few weeks after the CAE had left, the Hudson's Bay Company (HBC) opened a fur trade post on Bernard Harbour, originally called Fort Bacon, after Fur Trade Commissioner N.H. Bacon. When James Thomson became commissioner in 1920, the post was renamed to Fort Thomson. Circa 1925, it became known as Bernard Harbour. In 1930, the Hudson's Bay Company vessel Aklavik over-wintered at Bernard Harbour, where she sank, but was refloated and repaired. In 1931, an outpost was built on Read Island (also spelled Reid Island) on the opposite side of Dolphin and Union Strait, and the following year, all operations were moved to Read Island and the Bernard Harbour post closed.

In 1957, a DEW Intermediate site was established at Bernard Harbour, designated "PIN-C". It was an expansive facility with airstrip and dock facility for resupplying. It was closed and site abandoned in 1963. In September 1991, it reopened as an unattended NWS Short Range Radar site 5.0 kilometres (3.1 mi) southwest of the former DEW site.

== See also ==
- List of communities in Nunavut
