= McConnell River =

Coordinates: 60°49′14″N 094°21′58″W

Location
- Country: Canada
- Territory: Nunavut

Physical characteristics
- Mouth
  - location: Northwestern Hudson Bay

Ramsar Wetland
- Designated: 24 May 1982
- Reference no.: 248

The McConnell River is located in the Kivalliq Region of northern Canada's territory of Nunavut. It drains into Hudson Bay and is the namesake for the Kuugaarjuk Migratory Bird Sanctuary.

It is home to snow (blue) and Canada geese.

== See also ==
- List of rivers of Nunavut
