= Arviqtujuq Kangiqtua =

Fjord in Nunavut, Canada

- Location in Nunavut
- Location: Baffin Island, Nunavut
- Coordinates: 70°42′02″N 69°57′15″W
- Ocean/sea sources: Baffin Bay
- Basin countries: Canada
- Max. length: 65 km (40 mi)
- Max. width: 14 km (8.7 mi)

Arviqtujuq Kangiqtua (Inuktitut syllabics: ᐊᕐᕕᖅᑐᔪᖅ ᑲᖏᖅᑐᐊ) formerly Eglinton Fiord is a fjord on Baffin Island's northeastern coast in the Qikiqtaaluk Region of Nunavut, Canada. The Inuit settlement of Pond Inlet is 355 km (221 mi) to the northwest and Clyde River is 55 km (34 mi) to the east.

== History ==
Arviqtujuq Kangiqtua was one of the traditional hunting areas of the Inuit. This fjord was visited by the Wordie Arctic Expedition in 1934.

== Geography ==
Arviqtujuq Kangiqtua is located between Kangiqtualuk Uqquqti and Tasialuk fjords. It stretches roughly from northeast to southwest for about 65 km (40 mi). The Esquimaux River flows into the eastern side of the fjord at Ravenscraig Harbour, to the northeast of the Cormack Arm, and the Cockscomb River discharges its waters into the southern end of the fjord.

The mouth of Arviqtujuq Kangiqtua mouth opens to Baffin Bay where the southern headland at the entrance is Eglinton Point. It is 14 km (8.7 mi) wide at its mouth and narrows to a width of 2.5 km (1.6 mi) about 40 km (25 mi) within the fjord.

Much in the same manner as its neighbouring fjords, there are spectacular landscapes in the Eglinton Fiord, especially at the second bend in the inner fjord where massive summits loom above it, such as the Eglinton Tower on the eastern side and the 1,446 m (4,744 ft) high Cockscomb Mountain on the western side. In this area Atagulisaktalik to the west connects the inner reaches of the fjord through Ottawa Creek with Swiss Bay in Kangiqtualuk Uqquqti and the Ayr Pass connects with the Tasialuk fjord to the east.

== See also ==
- List of fjords in Canada
