= Copperneedle River =

Coordinates: 61°57′N 095°50′W

Location
- Country: Canada
- Territory: Nunavut

Physical characteristics
- Mouth
  - location: Northwestern Hudson Bay

The Copperneedle River originates within the northern Hearne Domain, Western Churchill province of the Churchill craton, the northwest section of the Canadian Shield in Nunavut's Kivalliq Region. There are rapids along the river, approximately 15 km (9.3 mi) from Hudson Bay's Dawson Inlet.

Copperneedle River is populated with Arctic char. The portion of the river near Southern Lake is part of the Beverly and Qamanirjuaq caribou range.

== See also ==
- List of rivers of Nunavut
