= Clyde River (Baffin Island) =

- Mouth location

Location
- Country: Canada
- Territory: Nunavut
- Island: Baffin Island

Physical characteristics
- Source
  - location: Generator Lake
  - elevation: 373 m (1,224 ft)
- Mouth
  - location: Clyde Inlet
  - coordinates: 69°51′10″N 70°25′15″W
  - elevation: 0 m (0 ft)

Clyde River is a waterway on the eastern coast of Baffin Island in the Qikiqtaaluk Region of Nunavut, Canada.

== Geography ==
The river outflows from Generator Lake at the southeastern end of Barnes Ice Cap in the Baffin Mountains. It flows in a roughly northeastern direction before reaching the head of Clyde Fiord in Kangiqtugaapik, Baffin Bay.

The nearest settlement, also named Clyde River, is approximately 100 kilometres (62 mi) to the northeast of the river's mouth.

== See also ==
- List of rivers of Nunavut
- Geography of Nunavut
