= Atagulisaktalik =

Mountain pass in Nunavut, Canada

- Location within Nunavut
- Elevation: 60 m (200 ft)

Third Approach
- Location: Baffin Island
- Range: Baffin Mountains
- Coordinates: 70°29′41″N 70°48′05″W

Atagulisaktalik (Inuktitut syllabics: ᐊᑕᒍᓕᓴᒃᑕᓕᒃ) formerly known as Revoir Pass is a mountain pass in the central Baffin Mountains, Nunavut, Canada. It is named after the Revoir River.

Atagulisaktalik connects the inner reaches of Arviqtujuq Kangiqtua westwards through Ottawa Creek with Swiss Bay in Sam Ford Fiord.

== See also ==
- Ayr Pass
