= Clark Carter =

Australian explorer and filmmaker

- Born: 1984 (age 41–42); Australia
- Education: UNSW Sydney
- Occupation: Filmmaker
- Known for: Adventurer Filmmaker

Clark Carter (born 1984) is an Australian explorer and filmmaker. Clark Carter and Chris Bray became the first recorded people to walk across Victoria Island in the Arctic Archipelago.

== Education ==
Carter is a Film Studies graduate of UNSW Sydney B.Arts (Media and Communications) majoring in film.

== Career ==
At 21 years old, Carter attempted to cross Victoria Island in the Arctic. The exploration was cut short because of weather and other calamities. Carter returned with his partner Chris Bray and completed the crossing. The pair filmed both of the expeditions and the film was made into a documentary.

=== The Crossing (exploration of Victoria Island in the Arctic) ===
- The Crossing Director Julian Harvey (film about Carter's crossing of Victoria Island in the Arctic.
- The Crossing was nominated for the Foxtel Australian Documentary cash prize of $10,000 at the Sydney Film Festival.
- The crossing won the audience award for Best Documentary 2013.

=== 2012 ===
Clark Carter and Ben Turner attempted to row from Wilsons Promontory in Victoria to Hobart, Tasmania. After just a few days, the boat capsized and the trip was abandoned.

=== 2014 ===
Carter was an Associate Producer of a documentary called The Connection (2014). directed by former ABC journalist Shannon Harvey

=== Awards ===
- Australian Geographic Society's 2008 Spirit of Adventure Award

=== Books ===
- The 1000 Hour Day: Two Adventurers Take on the World's Harshest Island
