= Shaler Mountains =

Mountain range in Canada

Location in the Northwest Territories and Nunavut

The Shaler Mountains are a mountain range that cross the Northwest Territories-Nunavut border on north-central Victoria Island, Canada. Although located partly in Nunavut the majority of the range lies in the Northwest Territories. Its highest point is 655 m (2,149 ft), making it the highest point on Victoria Island.
