= Burnside River =

- Location within Nunavut

Location
- Country: Canada
- Territory: Nunavut

Physical characteristics
- Source: Contwoyto Lake
  - coordinates: 66°2′36″N 111°14′33″W
  - elevation: 444 m (1,457 ft)
- Mouth: Bathurst Inlet
  - location: Bathurst Inlet, Nunavut
  - coordinates: 66°51′N 108°04′W
  - elevation: 0 m (0 ft)
- Basin size: 16,800 km^{2} (6,500 sq mi)
- Discharge
  - average: 135 m^{3}/s (4,800 cu ft/s)
  - minimum: 46.8 m^{3}/s (1,650 cu ft/s)
  - maximum: 313 m^{3}/s (11,100 cu ft/s)

The Burnside River is a river in the Canadian territory of Nunavut. It has its headwaters at Contwoyto Lake, flows across the Precambrian Shield's Contwoyto Plateau, flows through isolated and rugged tundra, into Lake Kathawachaga, and through the Wilberforce Hills region. Before emptying into Bathurst Inlet on the Arctic Ocean, the Mara River empties into the Burnside River. The river has an island, Nadlak, historically notable for Inuit use of caribou antlers as hut roof infrastructures.

The river is surrounded by continuous permafrost. It is migratory crossing path of Bathurst barren-ground caribou. Wildlife includes Arctic wolf, grizzly bears and muskox, while birds include golden eagle, rough-legged hawk and gyrfalcon. Arctic char, Arctic grayling, lake trout, and whitefish are also found in the river. Plants along the shoreline include dwarf willow and alder, plus 125 different wild flowers.

Copper Inuit artifacts and gravestones are located in the Burnside River area, along with trade items (needles, tools) they received from Dene. The area was explored in 1821 and 1822 by Sir John Franklin. From 1930 to 1964, a Hudson's Bay Company trading post operated at the river's mouth where the community of Bathurst Inlet formed. Present day, it is a popular wilderness whitewater canoe route, offering long stretches of continuous whitewater, as well as several more challenging sets of rapids.

Over the period 1976 to 2022, the Burnside River has a mean flow of 135 cubic metres per second (4,800 cu ft/s). Mean minimal flow is 48.6 cubic metres per second (1,720 cu ft/s) and mean maximum flow is 313 cubic metres per second (11,100 cu ft/s). Record maximum flow was 995 cubic metres per second (35,100 cu ft/s) in June 2001, while record minimum flow was 0 cubic metres per second (0 cu ft/s) in April 1983.

== See also ==
- List of rivers of Nunavut
