= Kuugaaluk =

River in Nunavut, Canada

Kuugaaluk Kogalu River
- Kuugaaluk

Location
- Country: Canada
- Territory: Nunavut

Physical characteristics
- Source: Ayr Lake
  - location: Baffin Island
  - coordinates: 70°31′28″N 69°28′04″W
- Mouth: Baffin Bay
  - coordinates: 70°34′36″N 69°15′06″W
  - elevation: 0 m (0 ft)

Kuugaaluk (Inuktitut syllabics: ᑰᒑᓗᒃ) formerly Kogalu River is a river on the eastern coast of Baffin Island in the Qikiqtaaluk Region of Nunavut, Canada. The river outflows from Ayr Lake and travels 40 km (25 mi) before reaching Baffin Bay. The nearest settlement, Clyde River, is approximately 30 km (19 mi) away.

== See also ==
- List of rivers of Nunavut
- Geography of Nunavut
