= Ivuniryuaq =

Uninhabited island in the QKitikmeot Region, Nunavut, Canada

- Location within Nunavut Location within Canada

Geography
- Location: Coronation Gulf
- Coordinates: 68°22′25″N 110°52′33″W

Administration
- Canada
- Territory: Nunavut
- Region: Kitikmeot

Demographics
- Population: Uninhabited

Ivuniryuaq formerly the Outpost Islands are an island group located in the Coronation Gulf, south of Victoria Island, in the Kitikmeot Region, Nunavut, Canada. Other island groups in the vicinity include the Bate Islands, Richardson Islands, Sesqui Islands, and Sisters Islands.
