= Mara River (Nunavut) =

Coordinates: 66°34′05″N 108°55′54″W

Location
- Country: Canada
- Territory: Nunavut

Physical characteristics
- Source
  - location: Nose Lake
- Mouth
  - location: Burnside River, Bathurst Inlet
- Length: 260 km (160 mi)

The Mara River is a river in Nunavut which flows into the Burnside River to empty into Bathurst Inlet on the Arctic Ocean. It flows north from headwaters at Nose Lake and is 260 kilometres (160 mi) long.

== See also ==
- List of rivers of Nunavut
