= Bacon River =

River in Nunavut Province, Canada

- Location of mouth

Location
- Country: Canada
- Province: Nunavut

Physical characteristics
- Mouth
  - coordinates: 74°52′54″N 95°49′0″W

The Bacon River is a river on Cornwallis Island in the Qikiqtaaluk Region of Nunavut, Canada.

== See also ==
- List of rivers of Nunavut
- Geography of Nunavut
