= Kuugaarjuk Migratory Bird Sanctuary =

Migratory bird sanctuary in Nunavut, Canada

- McConnell River Migratory Bird Sanctuary
- IUCN category Ia (strict nature reserve)
- Interactive map of Kuugaarjuk Migratory Bird Sanctuary
- Nearest city: Arviat
- Coordinates: 60°50′N 94°20′W
- Area: 36,803 hectares (90,940 acres)
- Established: 1960
- Website: Kuugaarjuk Migratory Bird Sanctuary

Ramsar Wetland
- Official name: McConnell River
- Designated: May 24, 1982
- Reference no.: 248

The Kuugaarjuk Migratory Bird Sanctuary, formerly the McConnell River Migratory Bird Sanctuary, is located in the Kivalliq Region of Nunavut, Canada. The 36,803 hectares (90,940 acres) sanctuary is on Hudson Bay's west coast, 27 km (17 mi) south of Arviat, and 50 km (31 mi) north of the Manitoba border. Its prior name was derived from the McConnell River which flows to the Hudson Bay. The Bird Sanctuary is home to and an important breeding ground for cackling goose, lesser snow goose, Ross's goose, and Canada goose.

Established in 1960 under the Migratory Bird Sanctuary Regulations of the Migratory Birds Convention Act of 1917, the sanctuary is privately owned by the Inuit of Nunavut. It received Ramsar Convention designation May 24, 1982, making it Canada's 14th Ramsar site.

== See also ==
- List of Migratory Bird Sanctuaries of Canada
- Migratory Bird Treaty Act of 1918
