= Rae River =

Location
- Country: Canada
- Territory: Nunavut

Physical characteristics
- Source
  - location: Akuliakattak Lake
- Mouth
  - location: Coronation Gulf
  - coordinates: 67.917°N 115.550°W
  - elevation: Sea level

The Rae River (Pallirk) is a waterway that flows from Akuliakattak Lake into Richardson Bay, Coronation Gulf. Its mouth is situated northwest of Kugluktuk, Nunavut. Its shores were the ancestral home of Copper Inuit subgroups: the Kanianermiut (also known as Uallirgmiut) (located at the river's headwaters) and the Pallirmiut (located at the river's mouth).

The Rae River is named in honour of Scottish Arctic explorer John Rae.

== See also ==
- List of rivers of Nunavut
