= Little Partridge River (Buick River tributary) =

- Location of the mouth of the Little Partridge River in Manitoba

Location
- Country: Canada
- Province/ Territory: Manitoba, Nunavut

Physical characteristics
- Source: Roosevelt Lake
  - location: Kivalliq Region, Nunavut
  - coordinates: 60°04′28″N 101°36′48″W
  - elevation: 405 m (1,329 ft)
- Mouth: Jonasson Lake
  - location: Division No. 23, Manitoba
  - coordinates: 59°41′03″N 101°17′22″W
  - elevation: 334 m (1,096 ft)

Basin features
- River system: Hudson Bay drainage basin

The Little Partridge River is a river in Manitoba and Nunavut, Canada. It is in the Hudson Bay drainage basin and is a left tributary of the Buick River.

The river begins at Roosevelt Lake in the Kivalliq Region of Nunavut and travels south into Division No. 23 in Manitoba before reaching its mouth at Jonasson Lake. The lake drains via the Buick River and the Thlewiaza River to Hudson Bay.
