= Kangiqtugaapik =

Body of water in Baffin Island, Nunavut, Canada

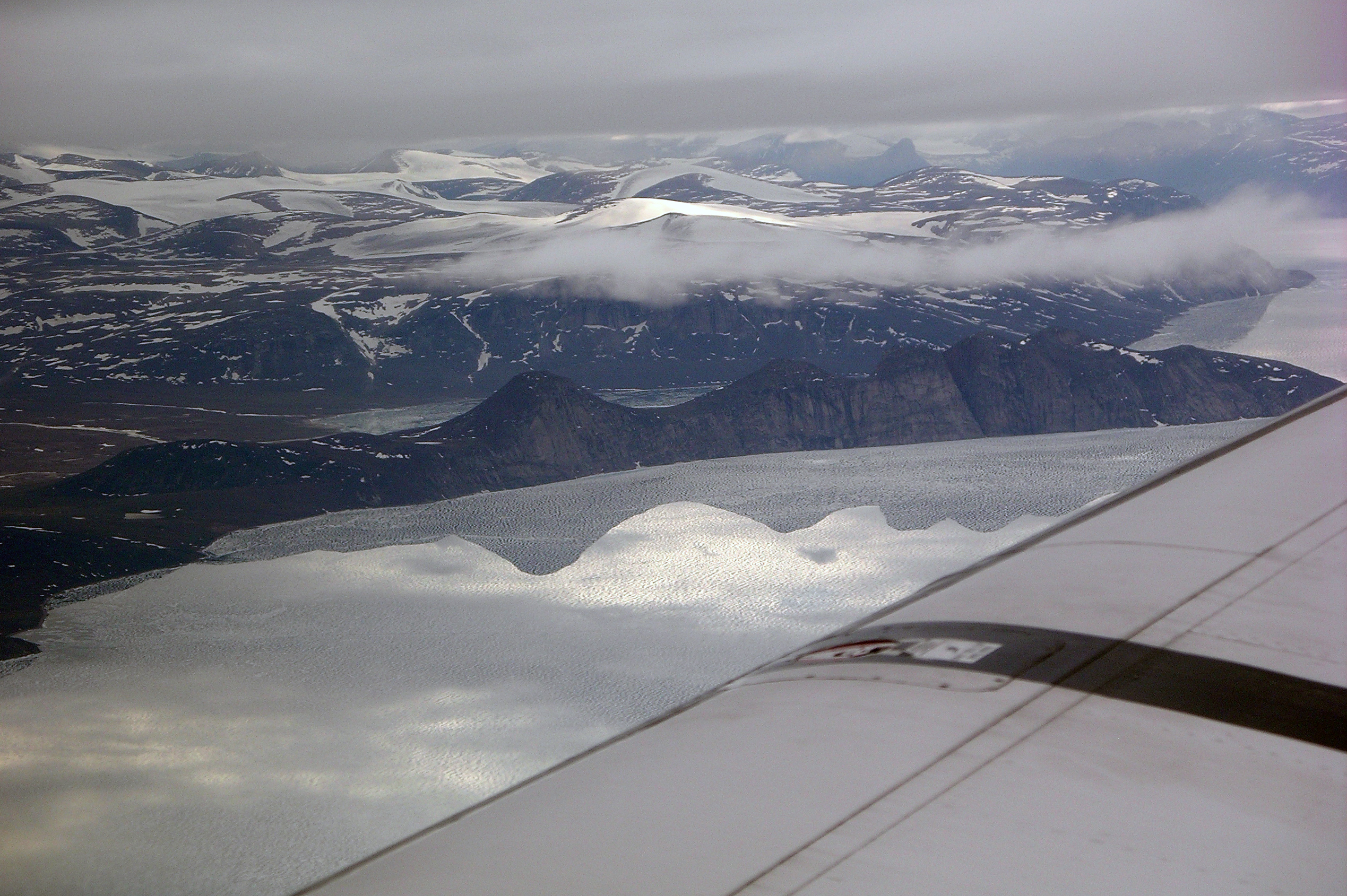
- View of Kangiqtugaapik

- Location in Nunavut
- Location: Baffin Island
- Coordinates: 70°14′37″N 68°57′37″W
- Ocean/sea sources: Baffin Bay
- Basin countries: Nunavut, Canada
- Max. length: 120 km (75 mi)
- Max. width: 16 km (9.9 mi)
- Settlements: Clyde River

Kangiqtugaapik (Inuktitut syllabics: ᑲᖏᖅᑐᒑᐱᒃ) formerly Clyde Inlet is a body of water in eastern Baffin Island, Qikiqtaaluk Region, Nunavut. Its mouth opens into the Davis Strait from the west.

The Inuit community of Clyde River is located on the inlet's Patricia Bay. The community is a popular launching-off point for remote big wall climbing on the east coast of Baffin. The nearby fiords are home to many granite walls with some established routes and plenty of space for new first ascents.

== Geography ==
At one time, before its deglaciation, Kangiqtugaapik was a 120 km (75 mi) long fjord.

The Kangiqtugaapik system includes three main geographic features, the 12 km (7.5 mi) long Patricia Bay close to the northern side of the entrance, where the inhabited settlement of Clyde River is located, as well as two long fjords branching roughly about 20 km (12 mi) from the mouth of the bay with their heads in the southwest.

=== Kangiqtugaapik ===
Kangiqtugaapik, is the northern branch. It is 95 km (59 mi) long and has the Clyde River at its head,

=== Inugsuin Fiord ===
The Inugsuin Fiord in the south is 90 km (56 mi) long and has a number of unnamed islands at its mouth. Tasiujaq is a small bay that flows into the fiord.

== See also ==
- List of fjords in Canada
