= Lawford Islands =

Island group in Nunavut, Canada

- Location within Nunavut Location within Canada

Geography
- Location: Coronation Gulf
- Coordinates: 67°55′59″N 113°04′59″W
- Area: 52 km^{2} (20 sq mi)

Administration
- Canada
- Territory: Nunavut
- Region: Kitikmeot

Demographics
- Population: Uninhabited

The Lawford Islands are an island group located inside western Coronation Gulf, south of Victoria Island, in the Kitikmeot Region, Nunavut, Canada. Other island groups in the vicinity include the Berens Islands, Black Berry Islands, Couper Islands, Deadman Islands, Leo Islands, and Sir Graham Moore Islands.
