= Kangiqtualuk Agguqti =

Fjord in Nunavut, Canada

- Location in Nunavut
- Location: Baffin Island, Nunavut
- Coordinates: 70°30′46″N 071°37′55″W
- Type: Fjord
- Ocean/sea sources: Baffin Bay
- Basin countries: Canada

Kangiqtualuk Agguqti (Inuktitut syllabics: ᑲᖏᖅᑐᐊᓗᒃ ᐊᒡᒍᖅᑎ) formerly Walker Arm is a tributary fjord of the Kangiqtualuk Uqquqti located on the northeast coast of Baffin Island in the Qikiqtaaluk Region in Nunavut, Canada. The Inuit settlement of Pond Inlet (or Mittimatalik in Inuktitut) is about 325 km (202 mi) to the northeast and that of Clyde River (or Kanngiqtugaapik in Inuktitut) is about 100 km (62 mi) to the east.
