= Lambert Island =

Island in Thunder Bay, Canada

- Interactive map of Lambert Island

Geography
- Location: Lake Superior
- Coordinates: 48°32′15″N 88°53′11″W

Administration
- Canada
- Province: Ontario
- District: Thunder Bay District
- Municipality: Shuniah

Lambert Island is an island located within Thunder Bay on the north shore of Lake Superior adjacent to Amethyst Harbour and Amethyst Beach. It falls within the boundaries of McGregor Township, Ontario, a part of the Municipality of Shuniah, Ontario.

It is a privately owned island developed by Lambert Island Ltd. and is connected to the mainland by a bridge maintained by the shareholders of the company. It enjoys the reputation of being an exclusive summer resort for affluent citizens of the city of Thunder Bay, Ontario.

Another Lambert Island is located on Georgian Bay of Lake Huron (44°55′13″N 79°52′16″W) and was previously owned by the aviation pioneer Orville Wright, who spent summers there between 1916 and 1941. During her lifetime, he was often accompanied by his sister Katharine. A 32-foot mahogany cruiser that Wright bought in 1931, which had been built by the Gidley Boat Works in Penetanguishene, was operated by him in Georgian Bay for many years. Wright named it the "Kittyhawk," recalling the site of the brothers' historic 1903 flight. The boat is still in use in the area.
