= Dease Strait =

Waterway in Nunavut, Canada

Coordinates: 68°50′N 107°30′W

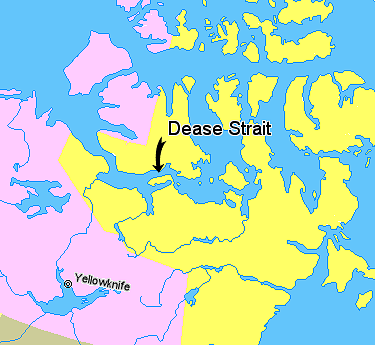
Dease Strait, Nunavut, Canada. Nunavut Northwest Territories

Dease Strait is an east–west waterway between the mainland's Kent Peninsula and Victoria Island in Nunavut, Canada. It is part of the Northwest Passage. At its eastern end, approximately 19 km (12 mi) wide, is Cambridge Bay; to the west it widens to approximately 61 km (38 mi) and becomes Coronation Gulf. The strait is 163 km (101 mi) long.

The Strait is named after the Canadian explorer Peter Warren Dease, who was the first to navigate it along with the Scottish explorer Thomas Simpson.
