= Prince Albert Peninsula =

Coordinates: 72°30′02″N 117°00′09″W

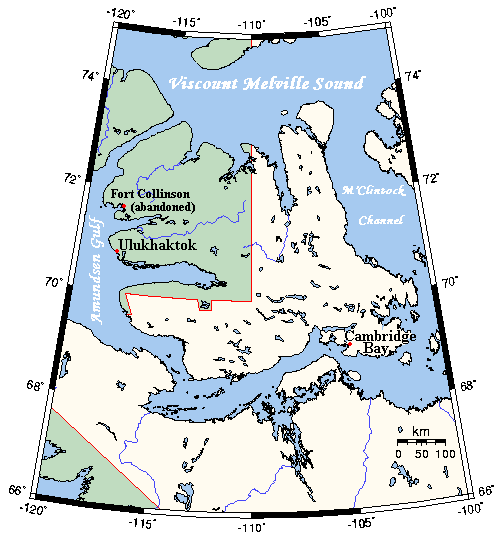
Map of Victoria Island

Prince Albert Peninsula is located on northwest Victoria Island in the Northwest Territories, Canada. It is separated from Banks Island by the Prince of Wales Strait. Two large waterways, Richard Collinson Inlet and Minto Inlet are to the north and south respectively. The Hudson's Bay Company's former trading post, Fort Collinson, is located on the south end of the peninsula.

It was named by Edward Augustus Inglefield.
