= Black Berry Islands =

Island group in Nunavut, Canada

- Location within Nunavut Location within Canada

Geography
- Location: Coronation Gulf
- Coordinates: 68°13′59″N 113°18′00″W

Administration
- Canada
- Territory: Nunavut
- Region: Kitikmeot

Demographics
- Population: Uninhabited

The Black Berry Islands are located in Coronation Gulf, south of Victoria Island. They are part of the Kitikmeot Region, in the Canadian territory of Nunavut.

Other island groups in the vicinity include the Berens Islands, Couper Islands, Deadman Islands, Lawford Islands, Leo Islands, and Sir Graham Moore Islands.
