= Duke of York Archipelago =

Island group in Nunavut, Canada

- Location within Nunavut Location within Canada

Geography
- Location: Coronation Gulf
- Coordinates: 68°12′N 112°22′W
- Archipelago: Arctic Archipelago

Administration
- Canada
- Territory: Nunavut
- Region: Kitikmeot

Demographics
- Population: Uninhabited

The Duke of York Archipelago is an uninhabited island group in the Kitikmeot Region, Nunavut, Canada. It is located in the Coronation Gulf. The archipelago was named in 1932 and named for the then Duke of York and later George VI.

The archipelago is composed of the islands of Akvitlak Islands, Anchor Island, Bate Islands, Hatoayok Island, Hokagon Island, Kabviukvik Island, Kingak Island, Mangak Island, Nagyuktok Island (historical home to Nagyuktogmiut, or Killinermiut, Copper Inuit) Nanukton Island, Outpost Islands, and Takhoalok Island.
