= Sir Graham Moore Islands (Nunavut) =

Island group in Nunavut, Canada

- Location within Nunavut Location within Canada

Geography
- Location: Coronation Gulf
- Coordinates: 67°50′N 113°55′W

Administration
- Canada
- Territory: Nunavut
- Region: Kitikmeot

Demographics
- Population: Uninhabited

The Sir Graham Moore Islands in the Canadian Arctic (67°50′N 113°55′W) are an island group located inside western Coronation Gulf, south of Victoria Island, in the Kitikmeot Region, Nunavut, Canada. Other island groups in the vicinity include the Berens Islands, Black Berry Islands Couper Islands, Deadman Islands, Lawford Islands, and Leo Islands.

Vice-Admiral Sir Graham Moore (1764–1843) was a British career officer in the Royal Navy.
