= Asiak River =

River in Canada

Coordinates: 67°45′52″N 114°25′01″W

- Location in Nunavut

Location
- Country: Canada
- Territory: Nunavut

Physical characteristics
- Mouth
  - location: Coronation Gulf
  - elevation: 0 m (0 ft)
- Basin size: Arctic Ocean

The Asiak River is a waterway in the Kitikmeot Region of Nunavut in Canada. It flows generally north to Coronation Gulf, an arm of the Arctic Ocean. It runs parallel to the Coppermine River, 29 kilometres (18 mi) to the west.

The Inuit community of Kugluktuk (formerly Coppermine) is located at the mouth of the Coppermine River, approximately 30.5 kilometres (19.0 mi) to the west.

== See also ==
- List of rivers of Nunavut
