= Kangiqtualuk Uqquqti =

Fjord in Nunavut, Canada

- Location in Nunavut
- Location: Baffin Island, Nunavut
- Coordinates: 70°43′51″N 070°43′53″W
- Type: Fjord
- Ocean/sea sources: Baffin Bay
- Basin countries: Canada
- Max. length: 110 km (68 mi)
- Max. width: 19 km (12 mi)

Kangiqtualuk Uqquqti (Inuktitut syllabics: ᑲᖏᖅᑐᐊᓗᒃ ᐅᖅᑯᖅᑎ) formerly Sam Ford Fiord is an isolated, elongated Arctic fjord on Baffin Island's northeastern coast in the Qikiqtaaluk Region of Nunavut, Canada. The Inuit settlement of Pond Inlet is 320 km (200 mi) to the northwest and Clyde River is 80 km (50 mi) to the east.

This fjord is reputed for the harsh beauty of its landscapes with rocky cliffs rising steeply from the shore. It is also a popular place with climbers.

== History ==
Kangiqtualuk Uqquqti had been one of the traditional hunting areas of the Inuit. It was renamed in memory of Inuk linguist Sam Ford, who died in a helicopter crash but it has since reverted to its original name.

== Geography ==
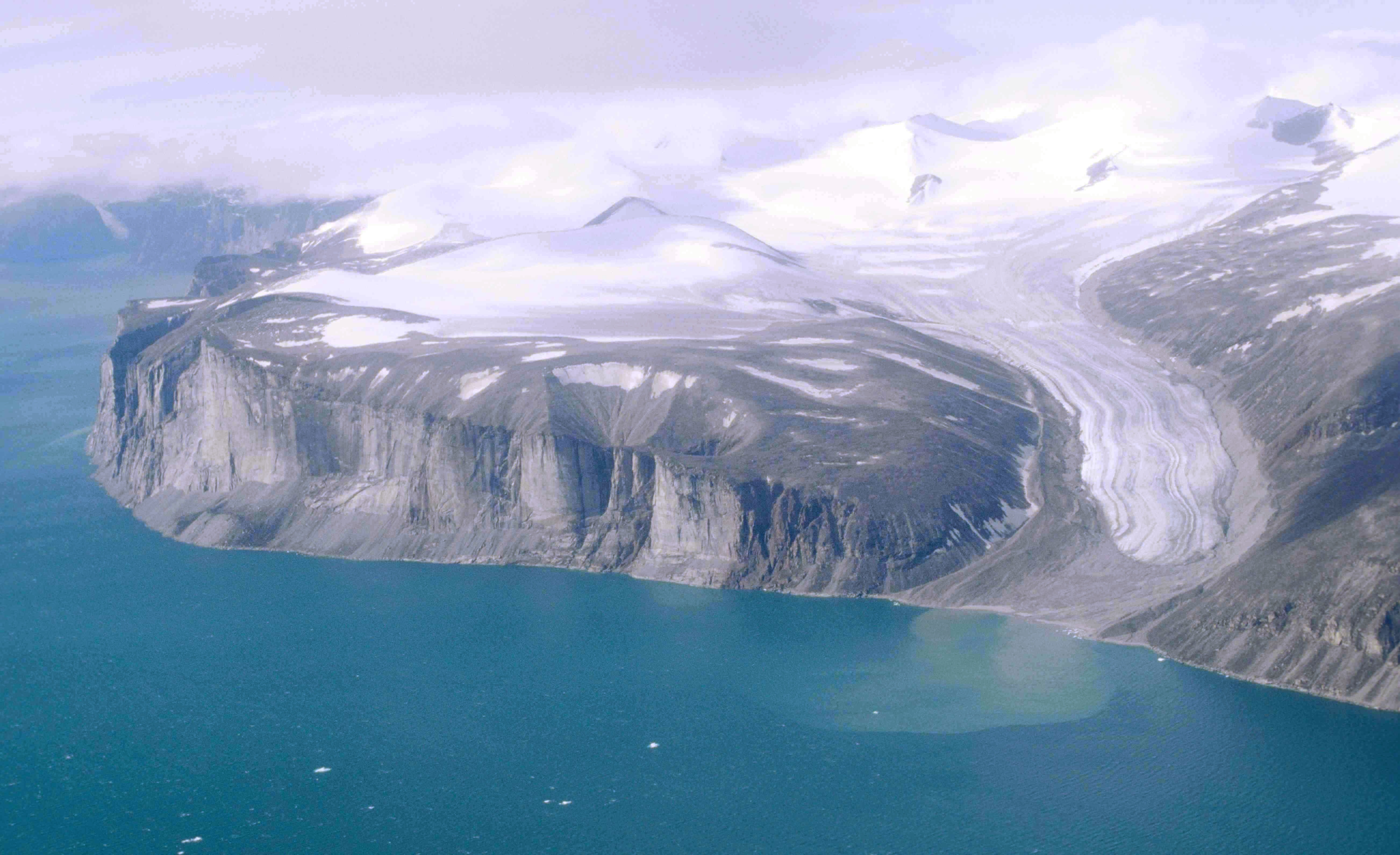
Western shoreline of Kangiqtualuk Uqquqti about 15 km (9.3 mi) from its mouth

Kangiqtualuk Uqquqti stretches roughly from north northeast to south southwest for about 110 km (68 mi). Its mouth, located between the Remote Peninsula and Erik Point, is over 18 km (11 mi) wide, the width of the fjord narrowing gradually to an average of 3 km (1.9 mi) about 50 km (31 mi) inland. Kangiqtualuk Agguqti is a tributary fjord branching west from the fjord's western shore about 45 km (28 mi) to the south of its mouth. The Stewart Valley —with Sail Peaks stretches northwards from Walker Arm's northwest corner and connects with the neighbouring Gibbs Fiord. Swiss Bay is a smaller inlet on the eastern shore of Sam Ford Fiord connecting through Ottawa Creek and Atagulisaktalik with the inner reaches of neighbouring Arviqtujuq Kangiqtua in the east. The Sam Ford River discharges its waters at the head of the fjord further south and Qikiqtakuluk is located within the inner section of the fjord off a small bay 15 km (9.3 mi) to the north northeast of the river's mouth.

Sam Ford Fiord is known for its glaciers and its awe-inspiring stark granite cliffs, rising steeply from its shores to heights up to 1,500 m (4,900 ft) above sea level in the area near Swiss Bay. Among the most impressive summits by the fjord Beluga Mountain, Rock Tower, Walrus Head Mountain, Broad Peak, Ottawa Peak, Sikunga Mountain, Turnagain Peak, and the Paalik Peak deserve mention.

A massive cliff on the eastern shore located at a bend in the fjord 49 km (30 mi) from its mouth at 70°37′51.82″N 70°55′0.33″W has a vertical wall dropping from a height of 1,368 m (4,488 ft) to the fjord's waters.

== See also ==
- List of fjords in Canada
- Baffin Mountains
