= Couper Islands =

Island group in Nunavut, Canada

- Location within Nunavut Location within Canada

Geography
- Location: Coronation Gulf
- Coordinates: 67°56′N 114°33′W

Administration
- Canada
- Territory: Nunavut

Demographics
- Population: Uninhabited

The Couper Islands are an island group located inside western Coronation Gulf, south of Victoria Island, in the Kitikmeot Region, Nunavut, Canada. Other island groups in the vicinity include the Berens Islands, Black Berry Islands, Deadman Islands, Lawford Islands, Leo Islands, and Sir Graham Moore Islands.

The community of Kugkluktuk (formerly Coppermine) is located 26.6 km (16.5 mi) to the southwest.
