= Berens Islands =

Island group in Nunavut, Canada

- Location within Nunavut Location within Canada

Geography
- Location: Coronation Gulf
- Coordinates: 67°55′30″N 114°00′00″W
- Area: 58 km^{2} (22 sq mi)

Administration
- Canada
- Territory: Nunavut
- Region: Kitikmeot

Demographics
- Population: Uninhabited

The Berens Islands are an island group located inside western Coronation Gulf in the Kitikmeot Region, Nunavut, Canada.

Other island groups in the vicinity include the Black Berry Islands, Couper Islands, Deadman Islands, Lawford Islands, Leo Islands, and Sir Graham Moore Islands.
