= Dolphin and Union Strait =

Coordinates: 69°05′10″N 116°02′30″W

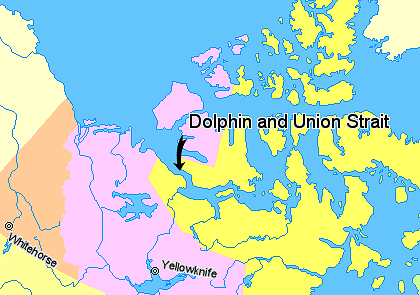
Dolphin and Union Strait, Canada. Nunavut Northwest Territories Yukon Territory Regions outside Canada (Alaska, Greenland)

Dolphin and Union Strait lies in both the Northwest Territories (Inuvik Region) and Nunavut (Kitikmeot Region), Canada, between the mainland and Victoria Island. It is part of the Northwest Passage. It links Amundsen Gulf, lying to the northwest, with Coronation Gulf, lying to the southeast. The southeastern end of the strait is marked by Austin Bay. It gets its name from the two boats used by the Scottish naval surgeon and explorer John Richardson, who was the first known European to explore it in 1826.

The Inuit who use this area have been variously known as the Copper Inuit, the Copper Eskimos, or the "People at the end of the world," because few other Indigenous groups had continuously used the area before. This is partly why the first Europeans who ventured into this area, were amazed by the "blond" Inuit they had encountered.

There are several islands within the strait, including the Liston and Sutton Islands, historically home to the Noahonirmiut band of Copper Inuit.

The strait is about 161 km (100 mi) long and ranges from 32 to 64 km (20 to 40 mi) in width. When frozen, it is used by barren-ground caribou, known as the Dolphin and Union herd, to reach Victoria Island for the summer and to return to the mainland for the winter. Eider ducks are also found in the strait.

The caribou are known locally as tuktu which is understood across the circumpolar world. Conversely, eider ducks are called kingalik which means, simply, "big-nose".

In recent decades, the local Inuvialuit have seen the reduction in average winter sea-ice thickness from roughly 1.8 to 2.1 m (6 to 7 ft) in the early 1960s to about 110 to 120 cm (43 to 47 in) even in the dead of winter today. There is also a preponderance of new species from flies to wasps, and new birds arriving that have never been seen before; grizzly bears roam where they were once that most rare curiosity.
