= Coronation Gulf =

Gulf between Victoria Island and mainland Nunavut in Canada

Coordinates: 68°08′N 112°00′W

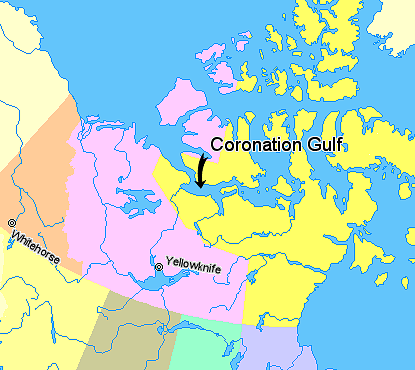
Coronation Gulf, Nunavut, Canada. Nunavut Northwest Territories Yukon Territory British Columbia Alberta Saskatchewan Manitoba Regions outside Canada (Greenland, Alaska)

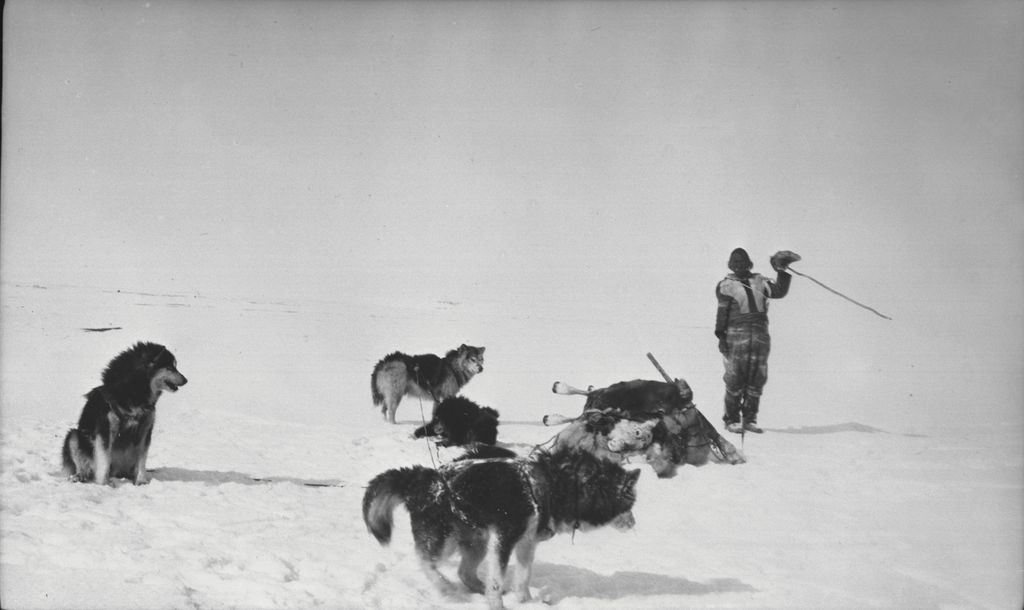
An Inuk man uses his sled and dogs to haul caribou carcasses at Coronation Gulf, April 1916

Coronation Gulf lies between Victoria Island and mainland Nunavut in Canada. To the northwest it connects with Dolphin and Union Strait and thence the Beaufort Sea and Arctic Ocean; to the northeast it connects with Dease Strait and thence Queen Maud Gulf.

The northwest point is Cape Krusenstern (not the Cape Krusenstern in Alaska). South of that is Richardson Bay and the mouths (from west to east) of the Rae River, Richardson River and the large Coppermine River, Napaaktoktok River, and the Asiak River. The Tree River enters at the south centre. At the southeast end is the large Bathurst Inlet. At the northeast end is Cape Flinders on the Kent Peninsula. In the centre of the gulf lies the Duke of York Archipelago.

The gulf was named by Sir John Franklin in 1821, in honour of the coronation of King George IV. The environment and Native culture of the area were studied by Rudolph Anderson and Diamond Jenness in 1916 as part of the Canadian Arctic Expedition.

The mainland south of the gulf may have substantial diamond and uranium deposits.

In 2010, the Coronation Gulf was the site of maritime disaster, when the Clipper Adventurer ran aground on a rock shoal. The accident punctured the ship's ballast and fuel tanks, releasing pollution into the pristine waters, and stranded 128 passengers and 69 crew members until the CCGS Amundsen came to rescue them.

== See also ==
- Royal eponyms in Canada
