= Victoria Island =

Island in Arctic Canada

Native name: Kitlineq
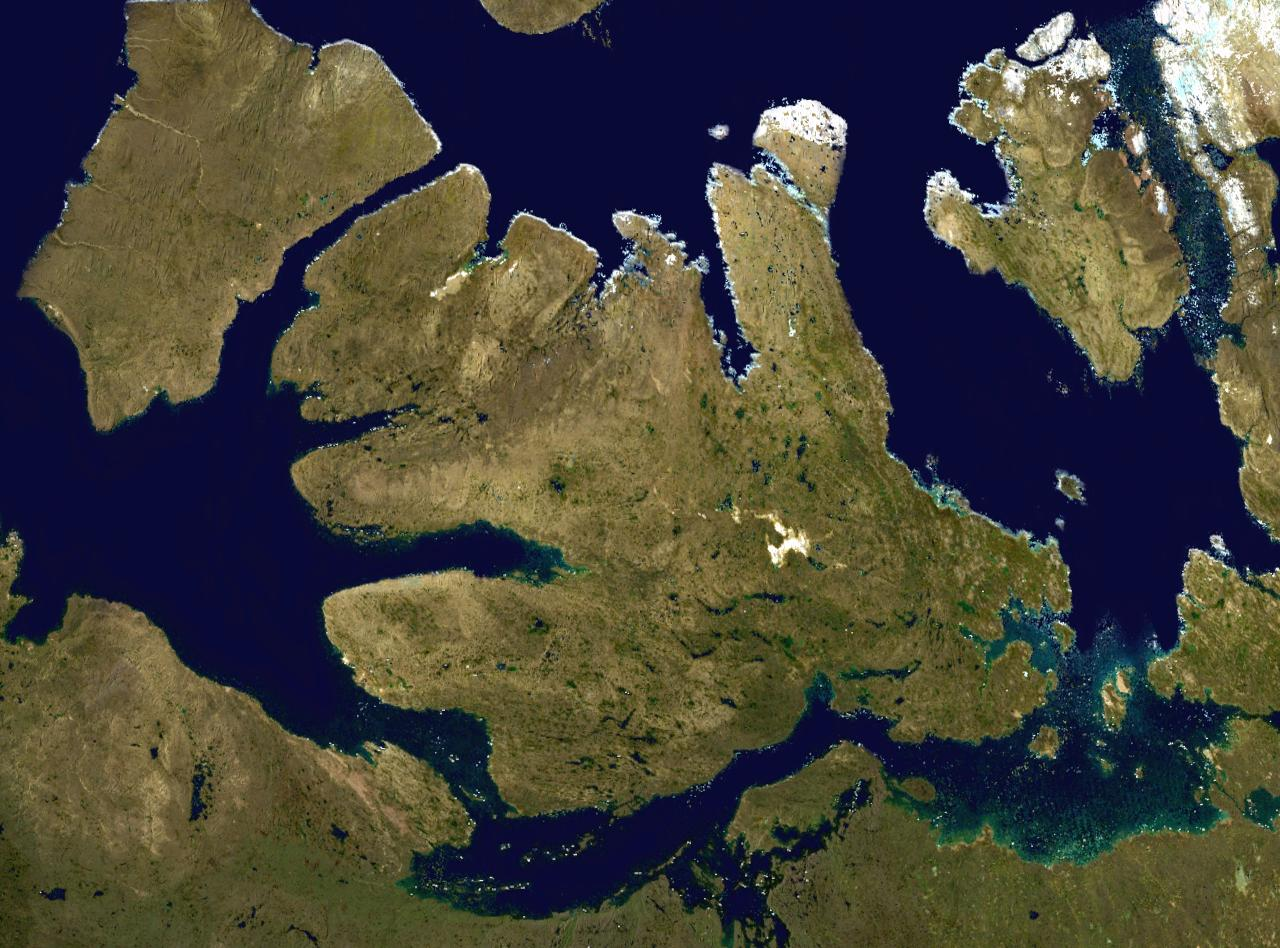

- Location within Nunavut Location within Canada

Geography
- Location: Northern Canada
- Coordinates: 70°25′N 107°45′W
- Archipelago: Arctic Archipelago
- Area: 219,191.31 km^{2} (84,630.24 sq mi) (2026)
- Area rank: 2nd in Canada & 8th worldwide
- Length: 700 km (430 mi)
- Width: 564–623 km (350–387 mi)
- Highest elevation: 655 m (2149 ft)
- Highest point: Unnamed

Administration
- Canada
- Territories: Northwest Territories; Nunavut
- Largest settlement: Cambridge Bay, Nunavut (pop. 1,760)

Demographics
- Population: 2,168 (2021)
- Ethnic groups: Inuit

Victoria Island (Note: Inuinnaqtun: Kitlineq) is a large island in the Arctic Archipelago that straddles the boundary between Nunavut and the Northwest Territories of Canada. It is the eighth-largest island in the world, and at 219,191.31 km^{2} (84,630.24 sq mi) in area, it is Canada's second-largest island. It is just double the size of Newfoundland (108,878.06 km^{2} [42,038.05 sq mi]), and is slightly larger than the island of Great Britain (218,634.50 km^{2} [84,415.25 sq mi]) but smaller than Honshu (228,296.26 km^{2} [88,145.68 sq mi]). The western third of the island lies in the Inuvik Region of the Northwest Territories; the remainder is part of Nunavut's Kitikmeot Region. The population of 2,168 is divided between two settlements, the larger of which is Cambridge Bay (Nunavut) and the other Ulukhaktok (Northwest Territories). The island is named after Queen Victoria, the British sovereign from 1837 to 1901. The features bearing the name "Prince Albert" are named after her consort, Albert.

== History ==
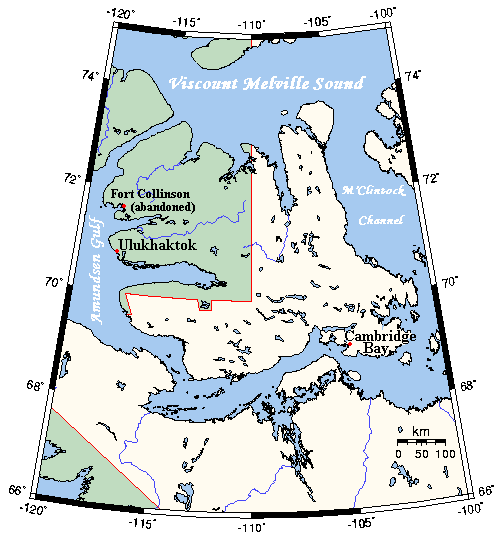
Closeup map of Victoria Island

Victoria Island was inhabited by the Thule culture, with five prehistoric qamutiik (sleds) belonging to the Neoeskimo culture being found on the Wollaston Peninsula, dating to 1250–1573 AD. The Inuinnaqtun name for the island is Kitlineq, with the local Inuit called Kitlinermiut (Copper Inuit). In 1826 John Richardson was the first European to see the southwest coast and called it "Wollaston Land". In 1839, Peter Warren Dease and Thomas Simpson followed its southeast coast and called it "Victoria Land". A map published by John Barrow in 1846 shows a complete blank from these two lands north to "Banks Land" which is the north coast of Banks Island. In 1851 John Rae charted its entire south coast and connected the two "lands". In 1850 and 1851 Robert McClure circumnavigated most of Banks Island, thereby separating it from the rest of Victoria Land. His men also charted the northwest and west coasts of Victoria Island. One of Roald Amundsen's men, Godfred Hansen, charted its east coast as far as Cape Nansen in 1905, and in 1916 and 1917 Storker T. Storkerson, of Vilhjalmur Stefansson's Canadian Arctic Expedition, charted its northeast coast, sighting the Storkerson Peninsula. In 2008 Clark Carter and Chris Bray became the first recorded people to walk across Victoria Island. Their first attempt at the 1,000 km (620 mi) trek in 2005 failed, so they returned and completed the remaining 660 km (410 mi) in 2008.

== Geography ==
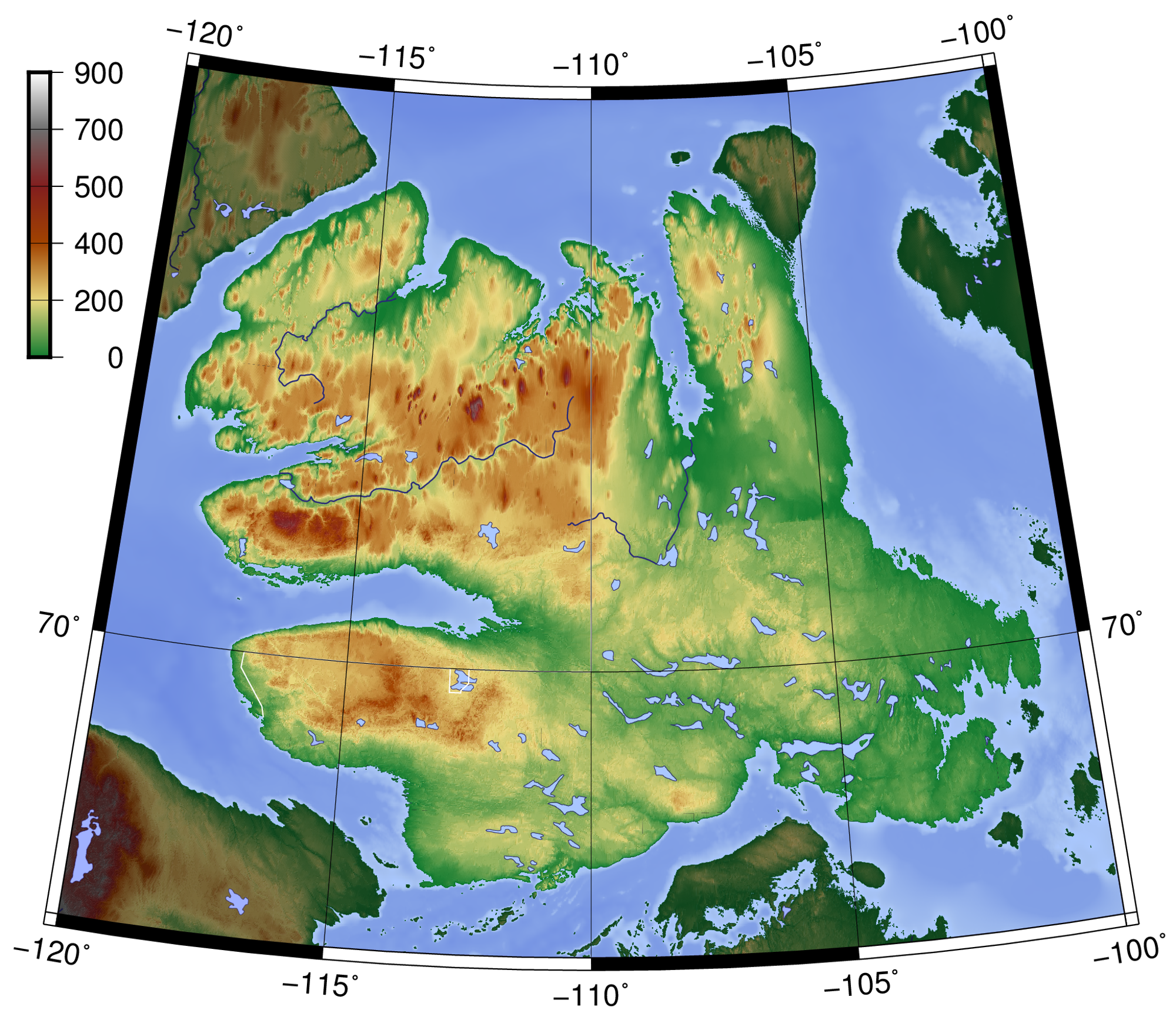
Topography of Victoria Island

Large native copper specimen from the Saneraum Hills, Victoria Island

Viscount Melville Sound^{map1} lies to the north, and the M'Clintock Channel^{map2} and Victoria Strait^{map3} lie eastward. On the west are Amundsen Gulf^{map4} and Banks Island,^{map5} which is separated from Victoria by a long sound called the Prince of Wales Strait.^{map6} To the south (from west to east) lie the Dolphin and Union Strait,^{map7} Austin Bay,^{map8} Coronation Gulf^{map9} and the Dease Strait.^{map10} The southern waterways, and sometimes the Prince of Wales Strait, form part of the disputed Northwest Passage which the Government of Canada claims are Canadian Internal Waters, while other nations state they are either territorial waters or international waters. Victoria Island is an island of peninsulas, having a heavily indented coastline with many inlets. In the east, pointing northwards, is the Storkerson Peninsula,^{map11} which ends with the Goldsmith Channel,^{map12} the body of water separating Victoria from Stefansson Island.^{map13} The Storkerson Peninsula is separated from the island's north-central areas by Hadley Bay,^{map14} a major inlet. Another, broad peninsula is found in the north, Prince Albert Peninsula.^{map15} This ends at the Prince of Wales Strait. In the south, and pointing westwards, is the Wollaston Peninsula,^{map16} separated from the island's central areas by Prince Albert Sound. The highest point of Victoria Island is 655 m (2,149 ft) in the Shaler Mountains^{map17} in the north-central region. Located in the southeast, just north of Cambridge Bay, is Tahiryuaq (formerly Ferguson Lake)^{map18}. With an area of 562 km^{2} (217 sq mi), it is the largest lake on the island. It was said by Andrew Hund in his book, Antarctica and the Arctic Circle: A Geographic Encyclopedia of the Earth's Polar Regions, that the island resembles a stylized maple leaf, the predominant symbol of Canada. Victoria Island contains the world's largest island within an island within an island.

=== Climate ===
Victoria Island has a polar climate, with no month having an average temperature of 10 °C (50 °F) or higher, and is listed as ET on the Köppen climate classification. Summers are typically cool and rainy, with pleasant days and chilly nights. Winters are cold, dark, and long, with October being the snowiest month. Snowfall and frosts are possible all year round. Rainfall is usually limited to the summer months, when the temperature shortly rises above freezing for a few months before dipping back down for another 9 months of winter. Springs are typically sunny but still very chilly. Autumns are short and crisp, with more frequent cloud cover starting to appear during August and with September being almost constantly cloudy. At Cambridge Bay, the sun is continuously below the horizon, polar night, from approximately November 30 to January 11 and above the horizon, midnight sun, May 19 to July 22.

Climate data for Cambridge Bay (Cambridge Bay Airport) WMO ID: 71925; coordinates 69°06′29″N 105°08′18″W; elevation: 31.1 m (102 ft); 1991–2020 normals (Note: Climate data 1991–2020 is a composite also recorded at Cambridge Bay GSN; WMO ID: 71288; coordinates 69°06′29″N 105°08′18″W; elevation: 18.7 m (61 ft) and Cambridge Bay Airport at WMO ID: 71925; coordinates 69°06′29″N 105°08′14″W; elevation: 31.1 m (102 ft))
Month	Jan	Feb	Mar	Apr	May	Jun	Jul	Aug	Sep	Oct	Nov	Dec	Year
Record high humidex	−5.0	−9.7	−4.1	3.9	10.5	25.3	30.8	28.6	16.3	5.8	−0.6	−3.5	30.8
Record high °C (°F)	−4.9 (23.2)	−9.4 (15.1)	−4.0 (24.8)	6.1 (43.0)	11.5 (52.7)	23.6 (74.5)	28.9 (84.0)	26.1 (79.0)	16.4 (61.5)	6.9 (44.4)	0.0 (32.0)	−3.4 (25.9)	28.9 (84.0)
Mean daily maximum °C (°F)	−27.7 (−17.9)	−28.6 (−19.5)	−24.9 (−12.8)	−16.2 (2.8)	−5.2 (22.6)	6.0 (42.8)	13.3 (55.9)	10.3 (50.5)	2.6 (36.7)	−6.6 (20.1)	−17.5 (0.5)	−24.3 (−11.7)	−9.9 (14.2)
Daily mean °C (°F)	−31.2 (−24.2)	−32.1 (−25.8)	−28.8 (−19.8)	−20.7 (−5.3)	−8.9 (16.0)	3.0 (37.4)	9.4 (48.9)	7.4 (45.3)	0.5 (32.9)	−9.5 (14.9)	−21.1 (−6.0)	−27.8 (−18.0)	−13.3 (8.1)
Mean daily minimum °C (°F)	−34.6 (−30.3)	−35.6 (−32.1)	−32.7 (−26.9)	−25.1 (−13.2)	−12.6 (9.3)	0.0 (32.0)	5.4 (41.7)	4.3 (39.7)	−1.7 (28.9)	−12.3 (9.9)	−24.7 (−12.5)	−31.3 (−24.3)	−16.7 (1.9)
Record low °C (°F)	−52.8 (−63.0)	−50.6 (−59.1)	−48.3 (−54.9)	−42.8 (−45.0)	−35.0 (−31.0)	−17.8 (0.0)	−8.2 (17.2)	−8.9 (16.0)	−17.2 (1.0)	−33.0 (−27.4)	−43.9 (−47.0)	−49.4 (−56.9)	−52.8 (−63.0)
Record low wind chill	−73.4	−72.6	−69.8	−60.1	−43.2	−29.2	−7.9	−18.1	−28.6	−49.4	−60.7	−66.3	−73.4
Average precipitation mm (inches)	5.6 (0.22)	5.9 (0.23)	9.2 (0.36)	6.9 (0.27)	6.7 (0.26)	16.4 (0.65)	28.0 (1.10)	23.5 (0.93)	18.4 (0.72)	14.8 (0.58)	8.9 (0.35)	6.2 (0.24)	150.4 (5.92)
Average rainfall mm (inches)	0.0 (0.0)	0.0 (0.0)	0.0 (0.0)	0.0 (0.0)	0.8 (0.03)	11.4 (0.45)	28.0 (1.10)	22.4 (0.88)	13.2 (0.52)	0.9 (0.04)	0.0 (0.0)	0.0 (0.0)	76.7 (3.02)
Average snowfall cm (inches)	6.3 (2.5)	5.5 (2.2)	8.1 (3.2)	7.5 (3.0)	6.4 (2.5)	3.4 (1.3)	0.2 (0.1)	1.8 (0.7)	5.4 (2.1)	16.6 (6.5)	10.9 (4.3)	7.4 (2.9)	79.4 (31.3)
Average precipitation days (≥ 0.2 mm)	8.4	7.5	11.7	7.9	6.9	9.4	11.1	12.3	12.0	13.8	10.8	8.6	120.5
Average rainy days (≥ 0.2 mm)	0.0	0.0	0.0	0.0	0.8	6.5	10.4	11.8	6.8	0.83	0.0	0.0	37.2
Average snowy days (≥ 0.2 cm)	8.0	6.2	10.0	7.5	6.2	3.5	0.2	0.8	5.7	13.1	10.2	8.4	79.9
Average relative humidity (%) (at 1500 LST)	66.4	66.4	68.7	73.9	82.8	78.0	68.0	73.4	82.2	86.2	75.8	68.6	74.2
Source: Environment and Climate Change Canada (June maximum

Climate data for Ulukhaktok (Ulukhaktok/Holman Airport) Climate ID: 2502501; coordinates 70°45′46″N 117°48′22″W; elevation: 36.0 m (118.1 ft); 1991–2020 normals, extremes 1979−present
Month	Jan	Feb	Mar	Apr	May	Jun	Jul	Aug	Sep	Oct	Nov	Dec	Year
Record high humidex	−6.5	−9.1	−3.8	7.1	10.4	23.0	26.3	27.2	17.0	5.2	−1.8	−3.6	27.2
Record high °C (°F)	−4.0 (24.8)	−6.5 (20.3)	−3.5 (25.7)	7.6 (45.7)	11.5 (52.7)	22.6 (72.7)	29.0 (84.2)	25.5 (77.9)	15.8 (60.4)	5.9 (42.6)	1.1 (34.0)	−3.0 (26.6)	29.0 (84.2)
Mean daily maximum °C (°F)	−23.5 (−10.3)	−24.3 (−11.7)	−21.5 (−6.7)	−12.6 (9.3)	−2.8 (27.0)	7.9 (46.2)	13.0 (55.4)	9.9 (49.8)	3.3 (37.9)	−5.4 (22.3)	−14.3 (6.3)	−21.0 (−5.8)	−7.6 (18.3)
Daily mean °C (°F)	−27.2 (−17.0)	−28.0 (−18.4)	−25.5 (−13.9)	−16.9 (1.6)	−6.0 (21.2)	4.8 (40.6)	9.3 (48.7)	7.1 (44.8)	1.1 (34.0)	−8.1 (17.4)	−17.6 (0.3)	−24.4 (−11.9)	−10.9 (12.4)
Mean daily minimum °C (°F)	−30.8 (−23.4)	−31.6 (−24.9)	−29.5 (−21.1)	−21.2 (−6.2)	−9.2 (15.4)	1.6 (34.9)	5.6 (42.1)	4.2 (39.6)	−1.0 (30.2)	−10.6 (12.9)	−20.9 (−5.6)	−27.7 (−17.9)	−14.3 (6.3)
Record low °C (°F)	−47.5 (−53.5)	−49.0 (−56.2)	−45.0 (−49.0)	−42.1 (−43.8)	−30.3 (−22.5)	−12.5 (9.5)	−3.5 (25.7)	−5.5 (22.1)	−15.5 (4.1)	−36.8 (−34.2)	−37.5 (−35.5)	−42.8 (−45.0)	−49.0 (−56.2)
Record low wind chill	−59.8	−65.9	−62.0	−49.2	−39.4	−21.3	−7.6	−12.1	−19.3	−36.0	−50.8	−53.1	−65.9
Average precipitation mm (inches)	10.2 (0.40)	8.9 (0.35)	10.5 (0.41)	7.5 (0.30)	8.9 (0.35)	10.9 (0.43)	23.6 (0.93)	31.5 (1.24)	22.5 (0.89)	17.2 (0.68)	13.4 (0.53)	10.6 (0.42)	175.7 (6.92)
Average rainfall mm (inches)	0.0 (0.0)	0.0 (0.0)	0.0 (0.0)	0.0 (0.0)	1.2 (0.05)	8.7 (0.34)	21.9 (0.86)	30.6 (1.20)	13.0 (0.51)	0.7 (0.03)	0.0 (0.0)	0.0 (0.0)	76.1 (3.00)
Average snowfall cm (inches)	9.7 (3.8)	7.9 (3.1)	8.3 (3.3)	5.8 (2.3)	5.9 (2.3)	1.3 (0.5)	0.0 (0.0)	2.0 (0.8)	7.2 (2.8)	18.9 (7.4)	15.0 (5.9)	9.9 (3.9)	91.8 (36.1)
Average precipitation days (≥ 0.2 mm)	8.8	8.0	8.3	6.7	6.9	6.4	9.3	12.6	11.9	11.5	10.6	8.7	109.7
Average rainy days (≥ 0.2 mm)	0.06	0.0	0.0	0.0	0.56	4.5	8.0	11.1	6.6	0.31	0.0	0.0	31.1
Average snowy days (≥ 0.2 cm)	6.1	5.6	6.2	4.5	4.7	1.2	0.06	0.71	3.8	10.6	9.3	6.4	58.9
Average relative humidity (%) (at 1500 LST)	76.4	75.9	75.2	71.2	74.4	73.1	69.4	75.8	79.7	84.5	83.3	78.5	76.4
Source: Environment and Climate Change Canada

== Biology ==
The Dolphin-Union caribou herd locally known as Island Caribou are a migratory population of barren-ground caribou, Rangifer tarandus groenlandicus, that occupy Victoria Island in Canada's High Arctic and the nearby mainland. They are endemic to Canada. They migrate across the Dolphin and Union Strait from their summer grazing on Victoria Island to their winter grazing area on the Nunavut-NWT mainland. It is unusual for North American caribou to seasonally cross sea ice and the only other caribou to do so are the Peary caribou, which are smaller in size and population, and also occur on Victoria Island. Beyond caribou, Victoria Island supports a rich lichen flora that underpins tundra food webs. A 2018–2019 survey around Cambridge Bay and the nearby Wellington Inlier documented 237 lichen species (186 collected during the survey and 51 from earlier records), including 35 not previously reported from the Canadian Arctic Archipelago. Lichens, which are a major winter food for muskox and caribou, are especially common in drier habitats on rock and organic soils. Species turnover is high at local scales (only three species were found across all six surveyed areas, while about 40% occurred at a single locality) and distributions are governed mainly by water availability and bedrock chemistry: lime-rich tills around Cambridge Bay favour crustose communities, whereas the older, more acidic rocks of the Wellington Inlier support a different suite with relatively more foliose and Cladonia species. The flora shows little endemism, likely because much of the landscape has been ice-free for only about 5,000 years; with ongoing Arctic warming and "greening", continued monitoring is warranted to track any shifts in species and cover.

== Demographics ==
In the 2021 Canadian census the population of the island was 2,168; 1,760 in Nunavut and 408 in the Northwest Territories. Of the two settlements on the island the larger is Cambridge Bay,^{map19} which lies on the south-east coast and is in Nunavut. Ulukhaktok^{map20} is on the west coast and is in the Northwest Territories. Trading posts, such as Fort Collinson^{map21} on the northwest coast, have long been abandoned.

== List of places by population ==
Name	Population
Cambridge Bay	1,760
Ulukhaktok	408

== Maps ==
- ^map1Viscount Melville Sound – 74°15′N 105°00′W
- ^map2M'Clintock Channel – 72°00′N 102°00′W
- ^map3Victoria Strait – 69°31′N 100°30′W
- ^map4Amundsen Gulf – 71°00′01″N 124°00′10″W
- ^map5Banks Island – 72°45′02″N 121°30′10″W
- ^map6Prince of Wales Strait – 72°21′14″N 118°46′57″W
- ^map7Dolphin and Union Strait – 69°05′10″N 116°02′30″W
- ^map8Austin Bay – 68°33′N 113°10′W
- ^map9Coronation Gulf – 68°08′N 112°00′W
- ^map10Dease Strait – 68°50′N 107°30′W
- ^map11Storkerson Peninsula – 72°30′N 106°30′W
- ^map12Goldsmith Channel – 73°10′N 106°05′W
- ^map13Stefansson Island – 73°20′N 105°45′W
- ^map14Hadley Bay – 72°31′N 108°12′W
- ^map15Prince Albert Peninsula – 72°30′02″N 117°00′09″W
- ^map16Wollaston Peninsula – 69°41′05″N 115°10′30″W
- ^map17Shaler Mountains – 71°55′02″N 111°30′07″W
- ^map18Tahiryuaq – 69°25′16″N 105°16′03″W
- ^map19Cambridge Bay – 69°06′50″N 105°03′10″W
- ^map20Ulukhaktok – 70°44′12″N 117°46′19″W
- ^map21Fort Collinson – 71°37′02″N 117°52′09″W

== See also ==
- Parker's Notch
- Royal eponyms in Canada
- Tunnunik impact crater
