= List of rivers of the Northwest Territories =

This is a list of rivers that are in whole or partly in the Northwest Territories, Canada.

== By watershed ==
=== Arctic Ocean watershed ===
- Back River (Nunavut)

Canadian Arctic Archipelago

- Hornaday River (Nunavut)
- Kagloryuak River (Nunavut)
- Nanook River (Nunavut)
- Roscoe River (Nunavut)
- Thomsen River

Beaufort Sea watershed

- Anderson River
- Horton River (Nunavut)
- Mackenzie River & watershed
  - Great Slave Lake watershed
    - Slave River (Alberta)
      - Grease River (Saskatchewan)
      - Salt River (Alberta)
    - Hay River (Alberta & British Columbia)
    - Yellowknife River
    - Cameron River
    - Taltson River
    - Lockhart River
  - Kakisa River (Alberta)
  - Horn River
  - Bouvier River
  - Redknife River
  - Trout River
  - Jean Marie River
  - Spence River
  - Rabbitskin River
  - Liard River (Yukon & British Columbia)
    - South Nahanni River (Yukon)
    - Muskeg River
    - Kotaneelee River (Yukon)
    - Frances River
  - Harris River
  - Martin River
  - Trail River
  - North Nahanni River
  - Root River
  - Willowlake River
  - River Between Two Mountains
  - Wrigley River
  - Ochre River
  - Johnson River
  - Blackwater River
  - Dahadinni River
  - Saline River
  - Redstone River
  - Keele River
  - Great Bear River
  - Snare River
    - Great Bear Lake watershed
      - Bloody River
      - Whitefish River
  - Little Bear River
  - Carcajou River
  - Mountain River
  - Donnelly River
  - Tsintu River
  - Hare Indian River
  - Loon River
  - Tieda River
  - Gillis River
  - Gossage River
  - Thunder River
  - Tree River (Nunavut)
  - Rabbit Hay River
  - Arctic Red River
  - Peel River (Yukon)
    - Ogilvie River
    - Blackstone River (Yukon)
    - Hart River
  - Rengleng River

Coronation Gulf watershed

- Coppermine River (Nunavut)
  - Kendall River

=== Atlantic Ocean watershed ===
Hudson Bay watershed

- Thelon River & watershed (Nunavut)
  - Elk River
  - Hanbury River

== Alphabetical ==
=== A ===
- Anderson River
- Arctic Red River

=== B ===
- Back River
- Blackstone River
- Blackwater River
- Bloody River
- Bouvier River

=== C ===
- Cameron River
- Carcajou River
- Coppermine River

=== D ===
- Dahadinni River
- Donnelly River

=== E ===
- Elk River

=== F ===
- Frances River

=== G ===
- Gillis River
- Gossage River
- Grease River
- Great Bear River

=== H ===
- Hanbury River
- Hare Indian River
- Harris River
- Hart River
- Hay River
- Horn River
- Hornaday River
- Horton River

=== J ===
- Jean Marie River
- Johnson River

=== K ===
- Kagloryuak River
- Kakisa River
- Keele River
- Kendall River
- Kotaneelee River

=== L ===
- Liard River
- Little Bear River
- Lockhart River
- Loon River

=== M ===
- Mackenzie River
- Martin River
- Masik River
- Mountain River
- Muskeg River

=== N ===
- Nanook River
- North Nahanni River

=== O ===
- Ochre River
- Ogilvie River

=== P ===
- Peel River

=== R ===
- Rabbit Hay River
- Rabbitskin River
- Redknife River
- Redstone River
- Rengleng River
- River Between Two Mountains
- Root River
- Roscoe River

=== S ===
- Saline River
- Salt River
- Slave River
- Snare River
- South Nahanni River
- Spence River

=== T ===
- Taltson River
- Thelon River
- Thomsen River
- Thunder River
- Tieda River
- Trail River
- Tree River
- Trout River
- Tsintu River

=== W ===
- Whitefish River
- Willowlake River
- Wrigley River

=== Y ===
- Yellowknife River

== See also ==
- List of rivers of Canada
