= François Beaulieu II =

Arctic guide and interpreter (1771 – 1872)

- Born: c. 1771; Northwest Territories
- Died: November 1872; Salt River, Northwest Territories, Canada
- Occupation(s): Metis leader, chief, interpreter, guide

François Beaulieu II (c. 1771 – November 1872) was a chief of the Yellowknife tribe. He was an Arctic guide and interpreter who played an important role in exploration of the Northwest Territories of Canada.

== Guide and chief ==
Beaulieu was a Metis, the son of François Beaulieu and Ethiba, a woman of Chipewyan and Cree descent. The circumstances of his childhood are speculation at present. As a young man, requested for his knowledge of the region, Beaulieu accompanied Sir Alexander Mackenzie on his overland trek to the Pacific in 1793. In 1820 he met Arctic explorer, John Franklin, and provided him with valuable information regarding a base camp on the Dease Arm of Great Bear Lake for his planned exploration to the mouth of the Coppermine River. (Franklin was unable to follow Beaulieu's advice, possibly resulting in the loss of life on that journey).

Beaulieu was the guide and interpreter on the second expedition from 1825–27 which was based at Fort Franklin on the west shore of Great Bear Lake. His knowledge and input into the planning and completion of this trip made it the most successful of its kind in the Canadian Arctic.

Beaulieu was well known as a chief of his tribe as well. As a chief of the Yellowknife tribe, Beaulieu became the "terror" of the neighboring tribes of Dogribs, Slaveys and Sekanis; he is said to have killed 12 of the last group with his own hand. He and his followers settled on the Salt River, where he maintained a trade in salt retrieved from the river with the Hudson's Bay Company, which granted him a monopoly. He was still active as a hunter at the age of 85 and lived to be just over 100.

Through marriage, he was a brother-in-law of Yellowknives chief Akaitcho, whom he succeeded as chief.

He died at the Salt River settlement in November 1872, his 101st year, though the date of his death is somewhat unsure.

== Salt River, NWT ==
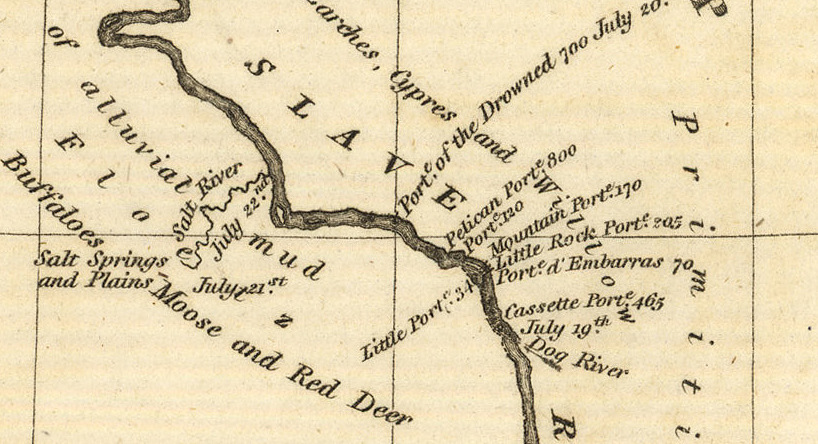
John Franklin's 1819-1820 expedition map showing Salt River, N.W.T.

In his book En route pour la mer Glaciale, Emile Petitot recounts his visit with Francois Beaulieu in 1862 at Salt River (near Fort Smith).
"That same night we set up our tent at Salt River. It is an undrinkable river whose source is the Caribou Mountains. The salt of this river is deposited naturally on the shore where a great quantity is taken to supply all the forts and missions of the north. This river belongs to its discoverer, a French Metis called Beaulieu, who has worked a piece of land into a nice farm where he lives with several of his children. He is one of the oldest who witnessed the events that happened in the north. His father, a Frenchman, was a coureur de bois working for the "Compagnie des Sioux". He came to this region that no one in Canada knew about. His son, our hero, who he had from a Chipewyan wife, saw arrive, in 1780, the first explorer of Great Slave Lake, Peter Pond; then in 1789, Sir Alexander Mackenzie. His uncle, Jacques Beaulieu, served as interpreter for the first of the officers of the Hudson's Bay Company. Himself at 18, accompanied to Great Bear Lake another Mackenzie who was a professional hunter. In 1825, he was the interpreter of Sir John Franklin.
Chosen by the Yellowknife tribe as their chief, Beaulieu became the terror of the Dogribs, the Slaveys and the Sekanis of whom he killed a dozen, around Fort Halkett. This Metis sultan, "sybarite" of the desert, who was of French blood but raised like a pagan, had three wives; one Cree, one Dene and one Metis. He also had children in all the tribes he had visited, without counting six married children, fathers and mothers or grown children, that lived with him.
In 1845, Beaulieu, saw the first Canadian missionary, Father Jean-Baptiste Thibault, at Portage La Loche. The faith of his father, that covered his pagan soul, was awakened. He became a serious convert, put away two of his wives and kept only the old Metis woman with whom he would remain faithful. He helped the others, returned their children, and insured that they were fed and supported. After that, the patriarch, which is what Beaulieu was called in this place, retired to Salt River, and sold its produce to the Hudson's Bay Company. The salt, the crops from his fields, milk from his cows, fish "coregone" from the Slave River, and the hunt, was ample enough to assure him and his dependents an easy life. He also traded in furs.
When I saw Beaulieu, in 1862, he was 85 years old, yet he still hunted by himself, travelled hundreds of miles, running behind his dogs. He died a few days after his birthday at 101 years old, leaving behind a brother in law named Poitras who was almost as old as him." (translation of pages 312 to 314)

== Personal life ==
In 1848, 'Old Man Beaulieu' was baptized by Father Alexandre-Antonin Taché, O.M.I., at Portage La Loche and became an active adherent to the Roman Catholic religion, as a result of which, at the age of 80, he dismissed two of his wives. He thereafter spent much energy promoting the Catholic faith.
