= Grease River =

River in Saskatchewan and the Northwest Territories, Canada

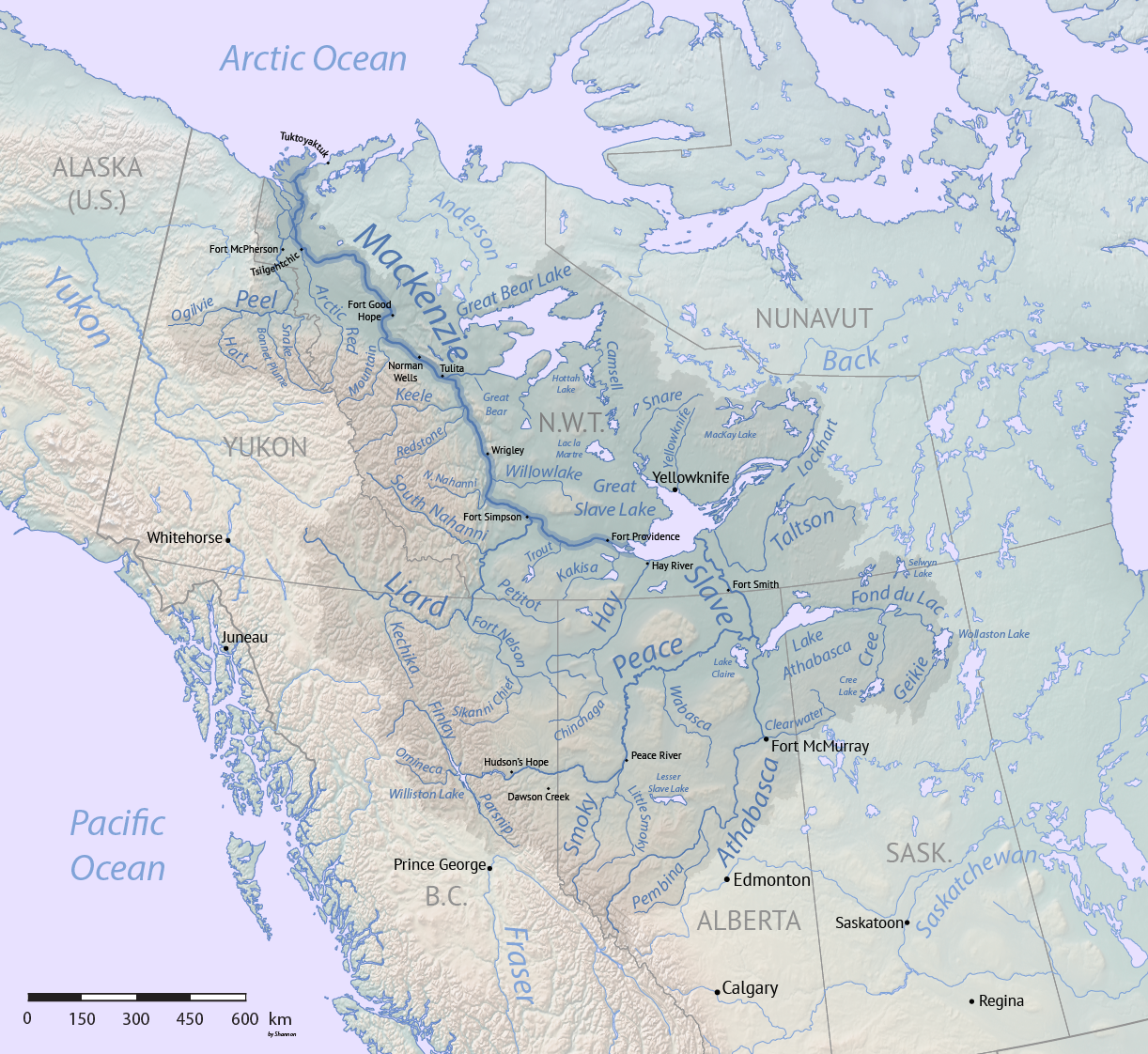
- Map of the Mackenzie River watershed

- Location of the river's mouth in Saskatchewan Grease River (Canada)

Location
- Country: Canada
- Province and territory: Saskatchewan; Northwest Territories (NWT)

Physical characteristics
- Source
  - location: South Slave Region, NWT
  - coordinates: 60.0436°N 106.5783°W
- Mouth: Lake Athabasca
  - location: Northern Administration District, Saskatchewan
  - coordinates: 59.3615°N 106.7909°W
  - elevation: 213 m (699 ft)

Basin features
- Progression: Lake Athabasca → Slave River → Great Slave Lake → Mackenzie River → Beaufort Sea (Arctic Ocean)
- River system: Mackenzie River
- Tributaries
  - left: Vernon Lake; Straight River
  - right: Picea River; Smith River
- Waterbodies: Lowery Lakes; Fontaine Lake; Eagle Rock Lake
- Waterfalls: McLeod Falls; Hunt Falls; Brown Falls

Grease River is a river in Saskatchewan and the Northwest Territories, Canada. It begins in the Northwest Territories and flows south into Saskatchewan where it empties into Lake Athabasca about 22 kilometres (14 mi) east of the community of Fond-du-Lac. The river is in the boreal forest ecoregion of the Canadian Shield. Along its course is Hunt Falls, which has one of the highest vertical drops for a waterfall in Saskatchewan. The river is fast moving and travels through rugged canyons and has multiple rapids and waterfalls along its course.

In 2002, an Arctic grayling was caught at Grease River that set a live release record. It was 96.5 centimetres (38.0 in) long.

== Description ==
Grease River begins at a small lake in the Northwest Territories, just north of the Saskatchewan border. It flows north out of the lake, and then it curves to the east and then to the south. As it approaches the border with Saskatchewan at the 60th parallel north, it flows through the Lowery Lakes. The Lowery Lakes are a chain of lakes along the Grease River that straddle the border. Continuing south, the Grease River empties into the large Fontaine Lake. Exiting at the lake's southern end, it flows over the Johnson Falls and the 2-metre (6 ft 7 in) high Brown Falls. After Brown Falls, the river continues south into the northern end of Eagle Rock Lake. Grease River exits Eagle Rock Lake from its eastern shore over the McLeod Falls. About 250 metres (820 ft) from McLeod Falls, the river flows over Hunt Falls. At 60 metres (200 ft) across, and a vertical drop of 15 metres (49 ft), Hunt Falls, which is situated on a fault line, is Saskatchewan's largest waterfall. In all, the falls drop 35 metres (115 ft) over a 3-kilometre (1.9 mi) distance. The Hunt Falls were originally named "Lefty's Falls" after bush pilot Hugh Boswell "Lefty" McLeod who had discovered it.

Continuing in a southerly direction from Hunt Falls, the Grease River is joined by the Straight River as it works its way through canyons and gorges towards its mouth at Grease Bay at Lake Athabasca. As it approaches the lake, it travels through Fond du Lac Indian reserve. The final 60 kilometres (37 mi) of the river to Lake Athabasca drops over 200 metres (660 ft) in elevation.

== See also ==
- List of rivers of Saskatchewan
- List of rivers of the Northwest Territories
