= Athabasca Sand Dunes Provincial Park =

Provincial park in Saskatchewan, Canada

- IUCN category Ib (wilderness area)
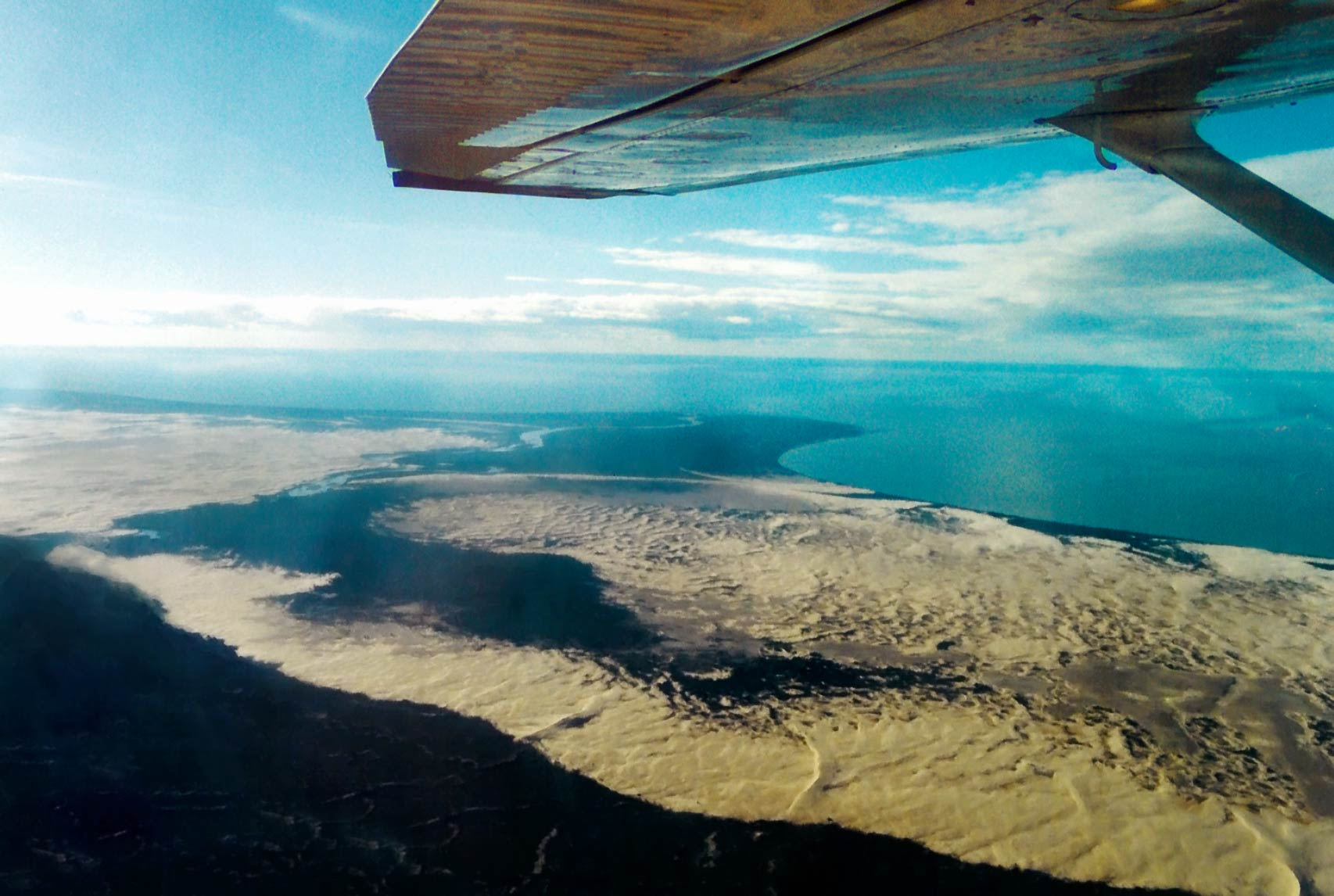
- Flyover of the sand dunes

- Location within Saskatchewan Location within Canada
- Interactive map of Athabasca Sand Dunes Provincial Park
- Location: Saskatchewan
- Nearest city: Uranium City
- Coordinates: 59°03′47″N 108°57′44″W
- Area: 1,925 km^{2} (743 sq mi)
- Established: August 1992
- Governing body: Saskatchewan Parks

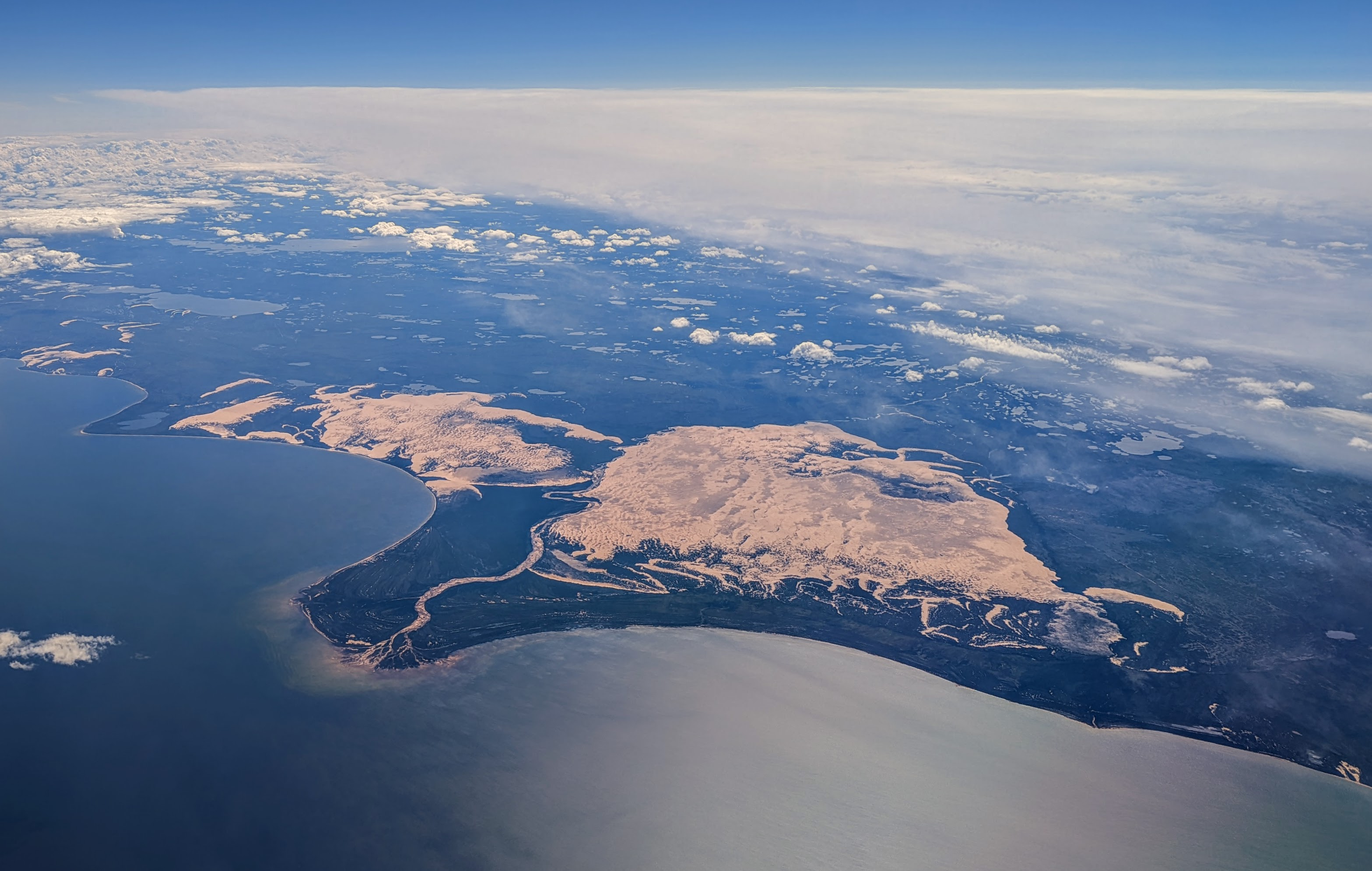
Athabasca sand dunes and vicinity aerial view

Athabasca Sand Dunes Provincial Park was created to protect the Athabasca sand dunes, a unique boreal shield ecosystem located in the far-northwest part of the Northern Saskatchewan Administration District. The Athabasca sand dunes are one of the most northerly active sand dune formations on Earth.

It first came to attention that it should be a protected area in 1969, finally becoming the Athabasca Sand Dunes Provincial Wilderness Park on August 24, 1992.

The park extends for 100 kilometres (62 mi) along the southern edge of Lake Athabasca and lies within the Athabasca Basin of the Canadian Shield. The sand dunes are 400 to 1,500 metres (1,300 to 4,900 ft) long, with a maximum height of approximately 30 metres (98 ft). The park is accessible by float plane or boat only.

The William River flows through the western section of the park, ending in a large river delta. The McFarlane River flows through the far eastern section of the park. The First Nations village of Fond du Lac is about 44 kilometres (27 mi), by air, from the park's eastern boundary. The park goes around the Fond du Lac 231 Indian reserve, located on the McFarlane.

== Geology ==
The Athabasca Sand Dunes are estimated to be approximately 8,000 years old, formed near the end of the last glacial period. As glaciers receded, meltwater washed enormous quantities of sand, silt and sediment from local sandstone into Lake Athabasca, whose water level was at the time much higher than currently. As the lake level declined to its modern depth, the large sand deposits were revealed. The sand dunes are quite unstable, being constantly shifted by winds, which push the dunes at the edges of the area into the surrounding forest. Evidence also suggests that fires have greatly influenced the winds shaping the dunes. Unlike the dunes closer to the lake, the southern dunes are in fact quite stable relative to other areas in the region.

Geological features that can be found in the region include eskers and beach ridges. In addition, portions of the Williams River in the region flow through braided channels in the sand. Some of the dune field is covered with desert pavement.

The dunes are generally parabolic in shape. The sand almost completely covers the underlying sandstone deposits; the bedrock is around 20 metres (66 ft) below ground on average. The entire sandy region, including areas south of the dunes, serves as an enormous aquifer, which as a result significantly affects plant life and dune development.

== Endemic flora ==
The area is home to numerous plant species (some of which are endemic or rare), including the felt-leaved willow (Salix silicicola), Mackenzie hairgrass (Deschampsia mackenzieana), Tyrrell's willow (Salix planifolia tyrrellii), pipsissewa (Chimaphila umbellata), woolly beachheather (Hudsonia tomentosa), black spruce (Picea mariana), sea thrift (Armeria maritima) and floccose tansy (Tanacetum huronense var. floccosum).

== Maps ==
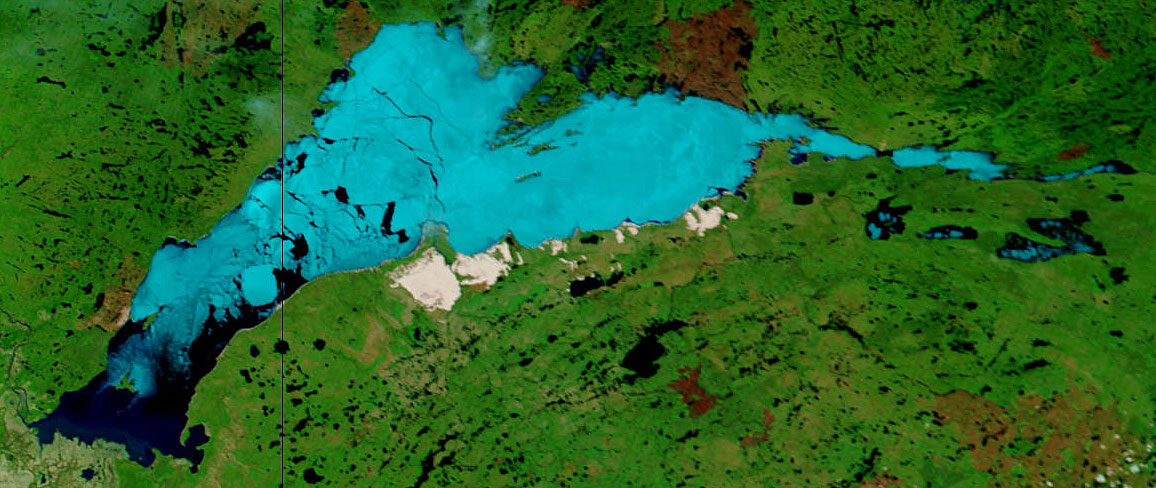
Lake Athabasca (data date June 9, 2002): the ice is light blue, dark blue is open water and the sand dunes located within the park on the south shore are white.

- Mouth of the William River 59°8′48.16″N 109°18′28.02″W
- Mouth of the McFarlane River 59°12′38.21″N 107°57′44.75″W
- Map

== See also ==
- List of provincial parks in Saskatchewan
- List of protected areas of Saskatchewan
- Geography of Saskatchewan
- Tourism in Saskatchewan
