= Anderson River (Northwest Territories) =

Anderson River Beghula
- Location of the Anderson River in Canada
- Native name: Kuuk (Inuinnaqtun)

Location
- Country: Canada
- Territory: Northwest Territories

Physical characteristics
- Source: lakes north of Great Bear Lake
  - location: Sahtu Region
  - coordinates: 67°18′N 125°43′W
  - elevation: 244 m (801 ft)
- Mouth: Arctic Ocean
  - location: Beaufort Sea, Inuvik Region
  - coordinates: 69°43′N 129°00′W
  - elevation: 0 m (0 ft)
- Length: 692 km (430 mi)
- Discharge
  - location: below Carnwath River
  - average: 141.56 m^{3}/s (4,999 cu ft/s)
  - minimum: 4.65 m^{3}/s (164 cu ft/s)
  - maximum: 1,520 m^{3}/s (54,000 cu ft/s)

Basin features
- Tributaries
  - left: Carnwath River
- River source, names

The Anderson River (Inuvialuktun: Kuuk, river) is in the Northwest Territories in northern Canada. It originates in lakes northwest of Great Bear Lake; its headwaters are possibly on the north side of Colville Lake in the vicinity of the hamlet of Colville Lake. It flows north and west in the area between the Mackenzie and Coppermine Rivers. Its mouth is on the Beaufort Sea on the Arctic Ocean near the eastern end of Liverpool Bay at about 70 degrees north latitude. Its main tributary is the Carnwath River. Originally known as the Beghula River it was renamed to the Anderson River in 1857 by Roderick MacFarlane after James Anderson, both of the Hudson's Bay Company. Anderson was the Chief Factor in the Mackenzie District.

== Geography ==
The Anderson River's northwestern sloping drainage basin is a part of the Anderson Plain High Subarctic (HS) Ecoregion, itself a subsection of the Taiga Plains Ecozone and the Anderson Upland Low Arctic north (LAn) Ecoregion, which is part of the Southern Arctic Ecozone. The river encompasses wildly varied landscape. Canyons are common in the upper and middle sections, the largest of which is Falcon Canyon, at 6 km (3.7 mi) long and approximately 40 m (130 ft) deep. The upper sections of the river are in taiga, with black spruce being the dominant tree. White spruce and shrublands grow on the river's floodplain and valley slopes. There are large deposits of alluvial terraces, along with cretaceous shales, Devonian limestone, and Devonian dolomite. Closer to the ocean, the river pulls above tree line, and continues through rolling tundra east of Inuvik.

Whitewater is most intense in the middle section of the river (around Falcon Canyon and upstream), with a couple of class III rapids, many class I and II, and no major falls.

== Wildlife ==
Wildlife is abundant on the Anderson. The Bluenose barren-ground caribou herd, which calves further east near Bluenose Lake, Nunavut, migrates south down parts of the Anderson River valley in July. Muskox, moose, and grizzly bears are also common along the river.

Bird life is also abundant and varied. However, the Canadian Wildlife Service's 1999 to 2008 Field Project at the Anderson River Delta entitled "Impact of Increased Harvest on the Western Arctic Snow Goose Population" shows a decline in snow geese.

The last 50 km (31 mi) of the river is listed as an Important Bird Area with an area of 759.2 km^{2} (75,920 ha; 187,600 acres). There is a larger area, 118,417 ha (292,610 acres; 1,184.17 km^{2}), known as the Anderson River Delta Migratory Bird Sanctuary.

On the delta and on the Arctic Ocean, ringed seals and bearded seals may be seen. On the ocean itself, pods of beluga whales are not uncommon.

== History ==
The Anderson River area was the historic home of an Inuvialuit group of Inuit called the Siglit, or Mackenzie Inuit, known as the Anderson River People. Although the Inuvialuktun name of the people is no longer known it is thought that they may have been called the Kuukugmiut, the Kuungmiut, as used by Emmanuel Felix, or Kramalit by Father Émile Petitot. The first two names are derived from the Inuvialuktun name of the river Kuuk (river) and means "people of the river".

In 1857, Roderick MacFarlane, known to the Inuit as "Mitchi Paloum", of the Hudson's Bay Company travelled the area looking to establish trade with the Inuit who, due to conflicts with the Gwich'in and the travel required, did not want to visit the post at Fort McPherson. On this trip he was met by a group of Inuit who proved to be hostile and he returned to Fort Good Hope. He returned again in 1858 and 1859, experiencing no difficulties and was able to begin trading with the Inuit. In 1860 he was again sent to the area, this time to establish a post for permanent trading. Construction of the post was begun in the spring of 1861 and finished before the onset of winter. The post, called Fort Anderson (named after James Anderson, chief factor of the Mackenzie River District from 1856 to 1857), was located on the east bank of the river about 183 km (114 mi) south of Liverpool Bay and 50 km (31 mi) north of the Anderson River Forks. While there MacFarlane was visited by Robert Kennicott and at Kennicott's urging began collecting for the Smithsonian Institution. He collected over 5,000 objects which are housed in the MacFarlane Collection. The post was successful until 1864–65. In 1864 a number of the dogs used to pull the sled were killed by distemper and then in 1865 a combination of scarlet fever and measles killed the majority of the Inuit and First Nations hunters in the area. MacFarlane remained at the fort until 15 July 1866, at which time the post was closed since it was unprofitable, and he was sent to Fort Simpson.

The Hudson's Bay Company also had a trading post at the river's mouth, later renamed as Stanton after Father Stanton (69°48′N 128°41′W), which is now abandoned. Sometime after 1925, possibly as late as 1950, a reindeer substation, called Anderson River (69°42′N 128°58′W), was opened around 16 kilometres (10 mi) south of Stanton.

== See also ==
- List of longest rivers of Canada
- List of rivers of the Northwest Territories
