= Whitefish River (Northwest Territories) =

Location
- Country: Canada
- Territory: Northwest Territories
- Region: Sahtu
- District: Deline

Physical characteristics
- Source: Unnamed lake
  - coordinates: 65°44′20″N 122°44′51″W
  - elevation: 480 m (1,570 ft)
- Mouth: Great Bear Lake
  - coordinates: 65°55′00″N 124°48′07″W
  - elevation: 186 m (610 ft)
- Length: 144 km (89 mi)
- Basin size: 4,740 km^{2} (1,830 sq mi)
- Discharge
  - average: 13.6 m^{3}/s (480 cu ft/s)

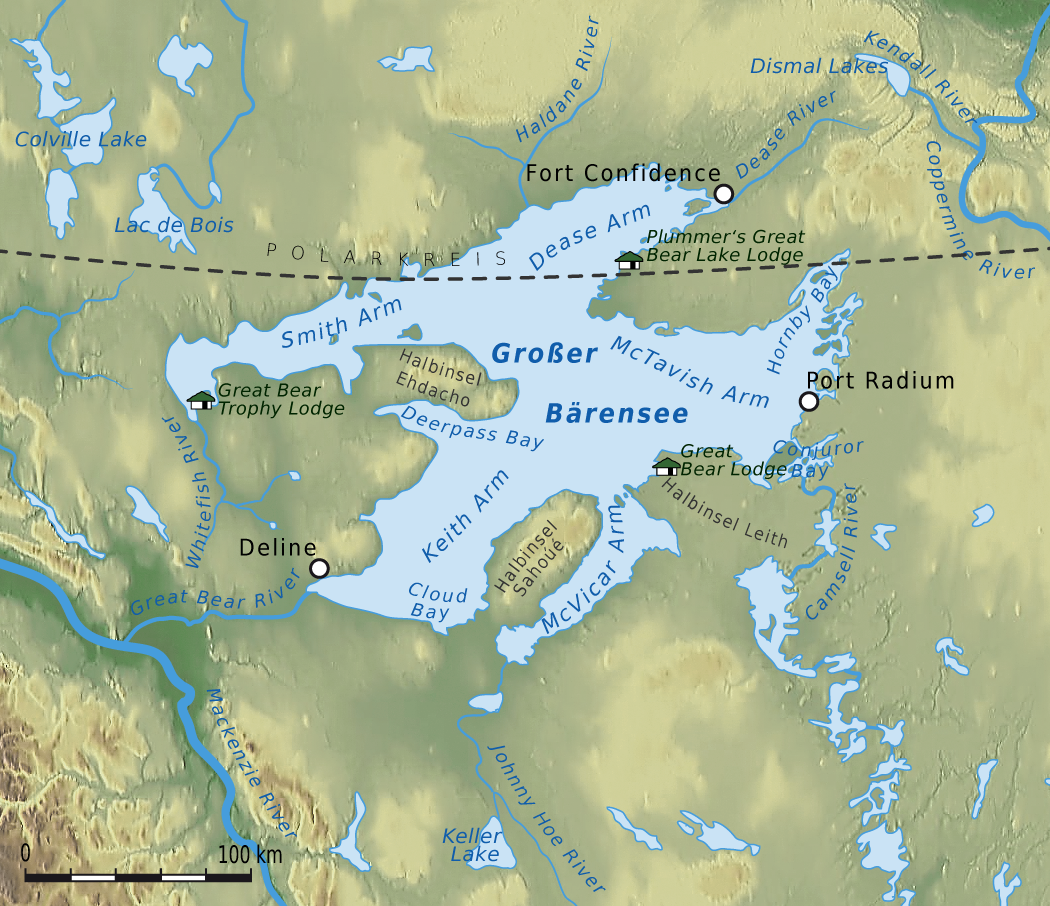
Great Bear lake

The Whitefish River is a river in the Deline District, Sahtu Region, Northwest Territories, Canada. It is in the Arctic Ocean and Mackenzie River drainage basins, is a tributary of Great Bear Lake and has a watershed of 4,740 square kilometres (1,830 sq mi).

== Course ==
The river begins at an unnamed lake and flows west then southwest to the west side of Man Drowned Himself Lake. It exits the lake at the south, takes in the unnamed left tributary arriving from Kekwinatui Lake, and heads southwest, west and northwest. It passes Whitefish River Airfield on the left bank of the river valley, and reaches its mouth at Bydand Bay on the Smith Arm of Great Bear Lake, about 14 kilometres (9 mi) south of Ford Bay Airport and 110 kilometres (68 mi) northeast of the community of Norman Wells. Great Bear Lake empties via the Great Bear River and the Mackenzie River into the Arctic Ocean.

== Hydrology ==
A hydrometric station operated near the mouth of the Whitefish River between 1977 and 1992. It recorded a mean annual flow of 13.6 cubic metres (480.3 cu ft) per second. The hydrometric station was re-established in July 2017.

== See also ==
- List of rivers of the Northwest Territories
