= Thomsen River =

River in Northwest Territories, Canada

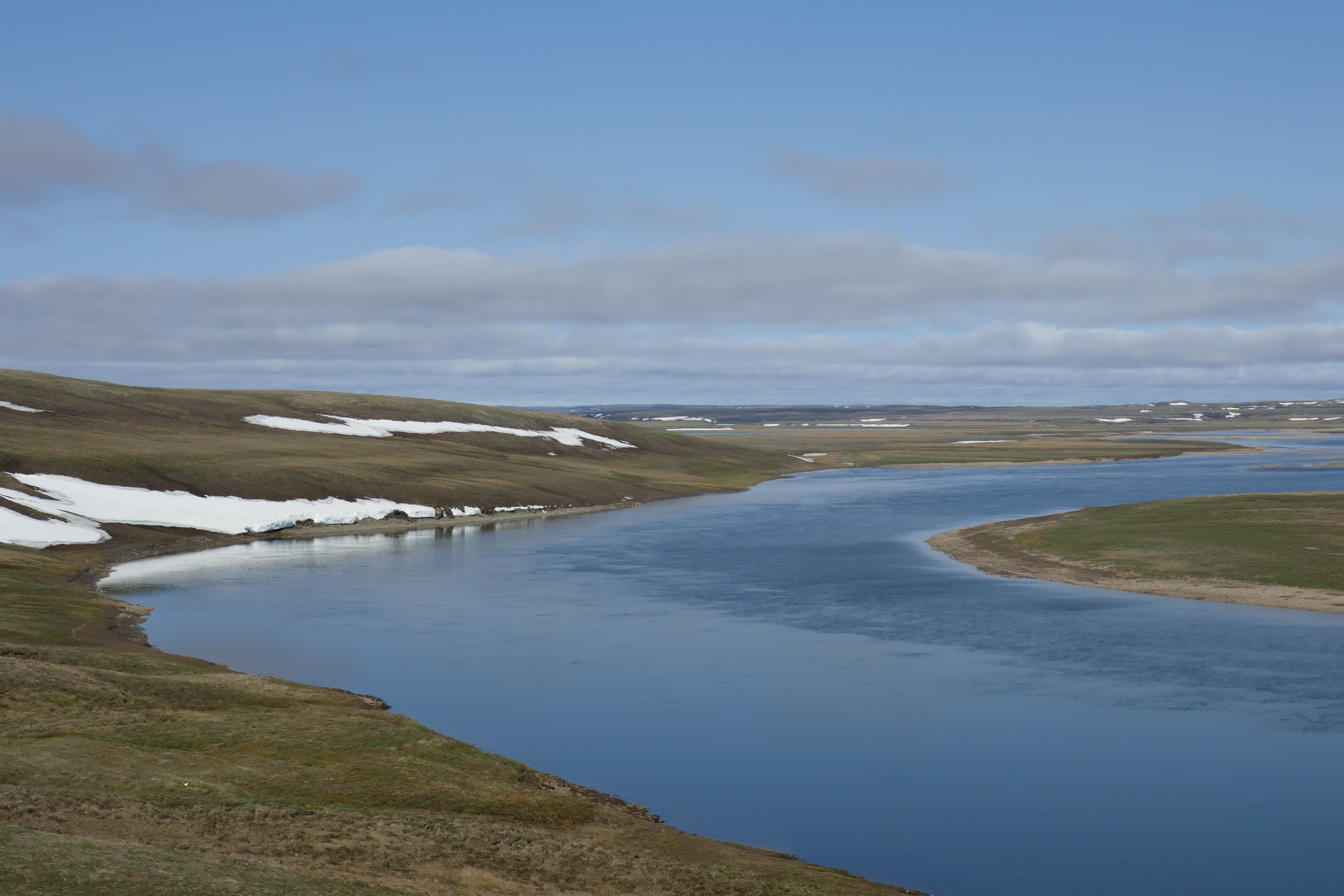
- Thomsen River in July

- Location of mouth

Location
- Country: Canada
- Territory: Northwest Territories

Physical characteristics
- Mouth
  - location: Castel Bay
  - coordinates: 73°59′41″N 119°43′27″W

The Thomsen River, located in the Northwest Territories of Canada, is the northernmost usable river of the country. It is famous for canoeing.

== Course ==
It flows across Banks Island in the Canadian Arctic Archipelago, and flows northward through Aulavik National Park before it empties through the Castel Bay into the M'Clure Strait (part of the Viscount Melville Sound of the Arctic Ocean).

== Fishing ==
The Thomsen River on northern Banks Island has been described as the most northerly multi-species river in North America. At least three fish species, lake trout (Salvelinus namaycush), least cisco (Coregonus sardinella), and ninespine stickleback (Pungitius pungitius), reach their known northern limit of distribution in the Thomsen River while the Arctic char (Salvelinus alpinus) is a common species. Lake whitefish (Coregonus clupeaformis) may also occur in upper reaches of the Thomsen and marine fourhorn sculpin (Myoxocephalus quadricornis) are occasionally found in the lower reaches of the river. Approximately one half of the Thomsen River watershed lies within Aulavik National Park.

== See also ==
- List of rivers of the Northwest Territories
- List of rivers of the Americas by coastline
