= Dismal Lakes =

- Location within Nunavut
- Location: Nunavut
- Coordinates: 65°25′0″N 117°0′0″W
- Type: lake
- Primary inflows: Teshierpi River
- Primary outflows: Kendall River
- Basin countries: Canada

The Dismal Lakes are a series of three interconnected lakes in the Canadian territory of Nunavut, located roughly midway between the Coronation Gulf and Great Bear Lake, east of the Dease River. The Teshierpi River discharges into the narrows between the second and third Dismal Lakes, and the third lake discharges into the Kendall River. The lakes were named by explorer Thomas Simpson.

Three kilometres west of the western lake is Sandy Creek, which flows south into the Dease River. The west end of western lake is surrounded by bare hills covered in sharp broken rock, and it is from this barren area that the lakes get their name. Three small brooks enter the lake at this end, one from the south, and two from the west. About 10 km from the western end of the lake it narrows to about 800 metres and, on the other side of these narrows, the lake is surrounded by rounded slopes covered with grass and heaths. There is a shallow sandbar extending across the eastern end of the lake.

The narrows between the first and second lakes are a favoured crossing-place for the caribou. The narrow river is confined between steep gravel hills and has a fairly strong current.

The centre lake is hemmed in by mountains. On the north side, the Coppermine Mountains rise in terraces to around 300 metres (1,000 ft). There are some small spruce in a cove on the north shore. On the south side of the lake is Teshierpi Mountain, the southernmost spur of the Coppermine Mountains, about 250 metres (800 ft) high. At the east end of the lake is a shallow sandbar which extends across the width of the lake, followed by a series of small willow covered islands.

The narrows between the second and third lakes is a short river with a sandy channel. The Teshierpi River joins this channel from the south.

The eastern lake is the smallest of the three, about five kilometres long and one-and-a-half kilometres wide. It is surrounded by gently rising grassy shores and, at a distance, mountains. There is a shallow sandbar extending across the eastern end of the lake. The third lake discharges into the Kendall River, which flows southwest into the Coppermine River. The extreme end of the third lake is sparsely wooded with small spruce, which extend down the Kendall.

The Dismal Lakes are one of the historical homes of Nagyuktogmiut, a Copper Inuit subgroup.
