= Fond du Lac 228 =

Indian reserve in Saskatchewan, Canada

Coordinates: 59°18′01″N 107°12′22″W

- Indian reserve
- Fond du Lac Indian Reserve No. 228
- Location in Saskatchewan
- First Nation: Fond du Lac
- Country: Canada
- Province: Saskatchewan

Area
  - Total: 1,082.5 ha (2,675 acres)

Fond du Lac 228 is an Indian reserve of the Fond du Lac Denesuline First Nation in Saskatchewan.

== See also ==
- List of Indian reserves in Saskatchewan
