= Nangmagvik Lake =

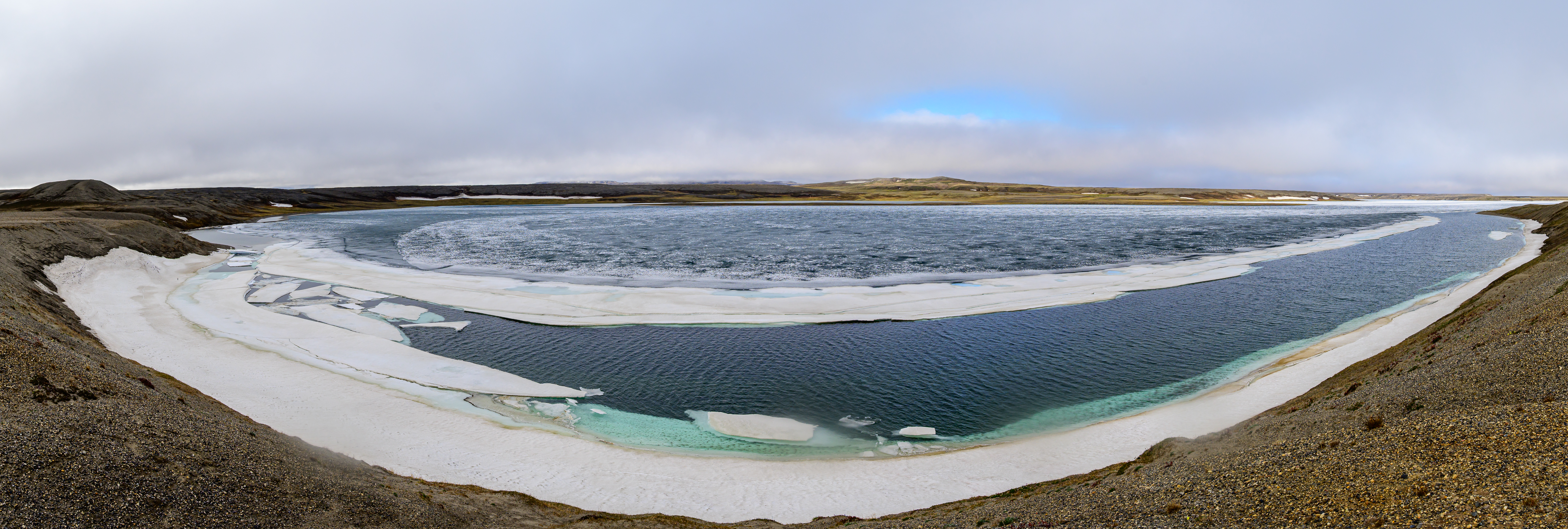
- Nangmagvik Lake (July 2025)

- Location of Nangmagvik Lake in Northwest Territories
- Location: Northwest Territories, Canada
- Coordinates: 74.15056°N 120.00302°W
- Type: Lake
- Surface area: 3.61 km^{2} (1.39 sq mi)
- Surface elevation: 1 m (3 ft 3 in)

Nangmagvik Lake is a lake within the Aulavik National Park in the northern part of Northwest Territories, Canada. Nangmagvik Lake is 3.6 square kilometres and 1 metre above sea level. It stretches 4.4 kilometres in the north–south direction, and 1.4 kilometers in the east–west direction.

The area around Nangmagvik Lake is barren, with little or no vegetation. The area around Nangmagvik Lake is almost unpopulated, with less than two inhabitants per square kilometre.
