= Kagloryuak River =

Location
- Country: Canada

Physical characteristics
- Source
  - elevation: 10 m (33 ft)
- Mouth
  - location: Prince Albert Sound
  - coordinates: 70°17′03″N 111°30′13″W
  - elevation: Sea level

The Kagloryuak River is located on Victoria Island in Northern Canada, commencing in Nunavut and ending in the Northwest Territories. Starting from the central plains, it flows west into Prince Albert Sound.

The Kagloryuak River Valley has a density of king eiders and Canada geese. In 2007, the Kagloryuak River Valley became a Key Migratory Bird Terrestrial Habitat Site

The river is an important source of Arctic charr for the community of Holman.

== See also ==
- List of rivers of the Northwest Territories
- List of rivers of Nunavut
