= Aulavik National Park =

National park in Northwest Territories, Canada

- Parc national Aulavik
- IUCN category II (national park)
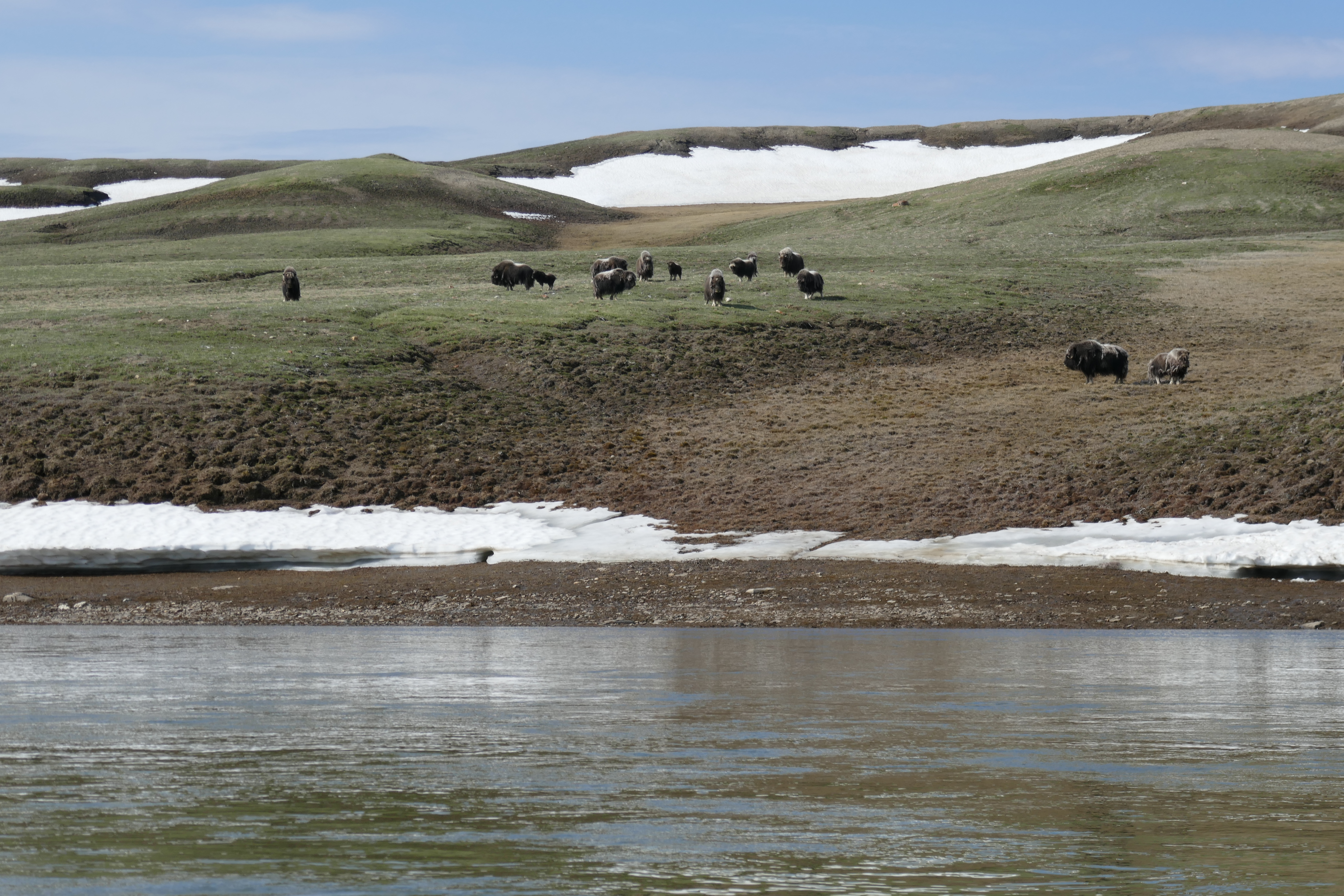
- Herd of muskox beside the Thomsen River

- Location within Canada Location within Northwest Territories
- Interactive map of Aulavik National Park
- Location: Banks Island, Northwest Territories, Canada
- Nearest city: Sachs Harbour, Yellowknife
- Coordinates: 73°45′N 119°37′W
- Area: 12,200 km^{2} (4,700 sq mi)
- Established: 1992
- Visitors: 34 (in 2022–23)
- Governing body: Parks Canada
- Website: Aulavik National Park

Aulavik National Park (/ˈaʊləvɪk/ OW-lə-vik); from the Inuvialuktun for "place where people travel") is a national park located on Banks Island in the Northwest Territories of Canada. It is known for its access to the Thomsen River, one of the most northerly navigable rivers in North America. The park is a fly-in park, and protects approximately 12,274 square kilometres (4,739 sq mi) of Arctic Lowlands at the northern end of the island. The most practical way to visit the park is to charter a plane, and currently the park has four landing sites. Aulavik is considered a polar desert and often experiences high winds. Precipitation for the park is approximately 300 mm (12 in) per year. In the southern regions of the park a sparsely vegetated upland plateau reaches a height of 450 m (1,480 ft) above sea level.

The park has the highest concentration of muskoxen on earth, with estimates of 68,000 to 80,000 animals on the island, approximately 20% of which are thought to reside in the park. It is also home to the endangered Peary caribou as well as the more common barren-ground caribou. Ptarmigan and ravens are considered the only year-round birds in the park, although 43 different species make seasonal use of the area. The park is completely treeless. It has 150 species of flowering plants. Arctic foxes, brown and northern collared lemmings, Arctic hares and wolves roam the rugged terrain. Marine mammals along the north coast include polar bears, ringed seals, bearded seals, beluga whales and bowhead whales. Birds of prey in the park include snowy owls, rough-legged hawks, gyrfalcons, and peregrine falcons, who feed on the lemmings.

Prior to the arrival of the Thule culture in southern Banks Island there were some Pre-Dorset culture people living in what is now the Aulavik National Park. Due to the cooling climate brought on by the Little Ice Age Banks Island was most likely deserted until the arrival of the Inuvialuit in the 17th century.

Aulavik National Park has two major bays, Castel Bay and Mercy Bay, and lies south of the McClure Strait. Captain Robert McClure, spent two winters in Mercy Bay on HMS Investigator, while searching for the missing John Franklin's lost expedition between 1850 and 1853. McClure's team abandoned their ship in Mercy Bay and hiked across the sea-ice of the strait to board another ship, HMS Resolute. Nangmagvik Lake is located within this national park.

The Mercy Bay area was visited by the Copper Inuit of Victoria Island to salvage materials left by McClure's party. They also hunted the caribou and muskox in the area as evidenced by the large number of food caches. In the 20th century the area was popular with Inuvialuit due to the large numbers of foxes. Until the fur trade went into decline, fox trapping provided a source of income for people from as far away as the Mackenzie Delta and the North Slope of Alaska. This influx of people led to the establishment of Sachs Harbour, the only community on the island.

== See also ==
- List of National Parks of Canada
- List of protected areas of the Northwest Territories
