= Roscoe River =

Location
- Country: Canada

Physical characteristics
- Mouth
  - location: Amundsen Gulf
  - coordinates: 69°39′51″N 120°57′27″W
  - elevation: Sea level

The Roscoe River is a waterway located above the Arctic Circle on the mainland of Northern Canada.

It originates at 68°41′55″N 120°12′35″W in western Kitikmeot Region, Nunavut, northwest of Bluenose Lake. The river passes through the Melville Hills and Tuktut Nogait National Park in the Northwest Territories, before emptying into Amundsen Gulf at its juncture with Dolphin and Union Strait, between Deas Thompson Point and Tysoe Point.

== History ==
During the Stefánsson-Anderson Arctic expedition of 1908–12, expedition party members found Inuit village ruins near the river.

== See also ==
- List of rivers of the Northwest Territories
- List of rivers of Nunavut
