= Artillery Lake =

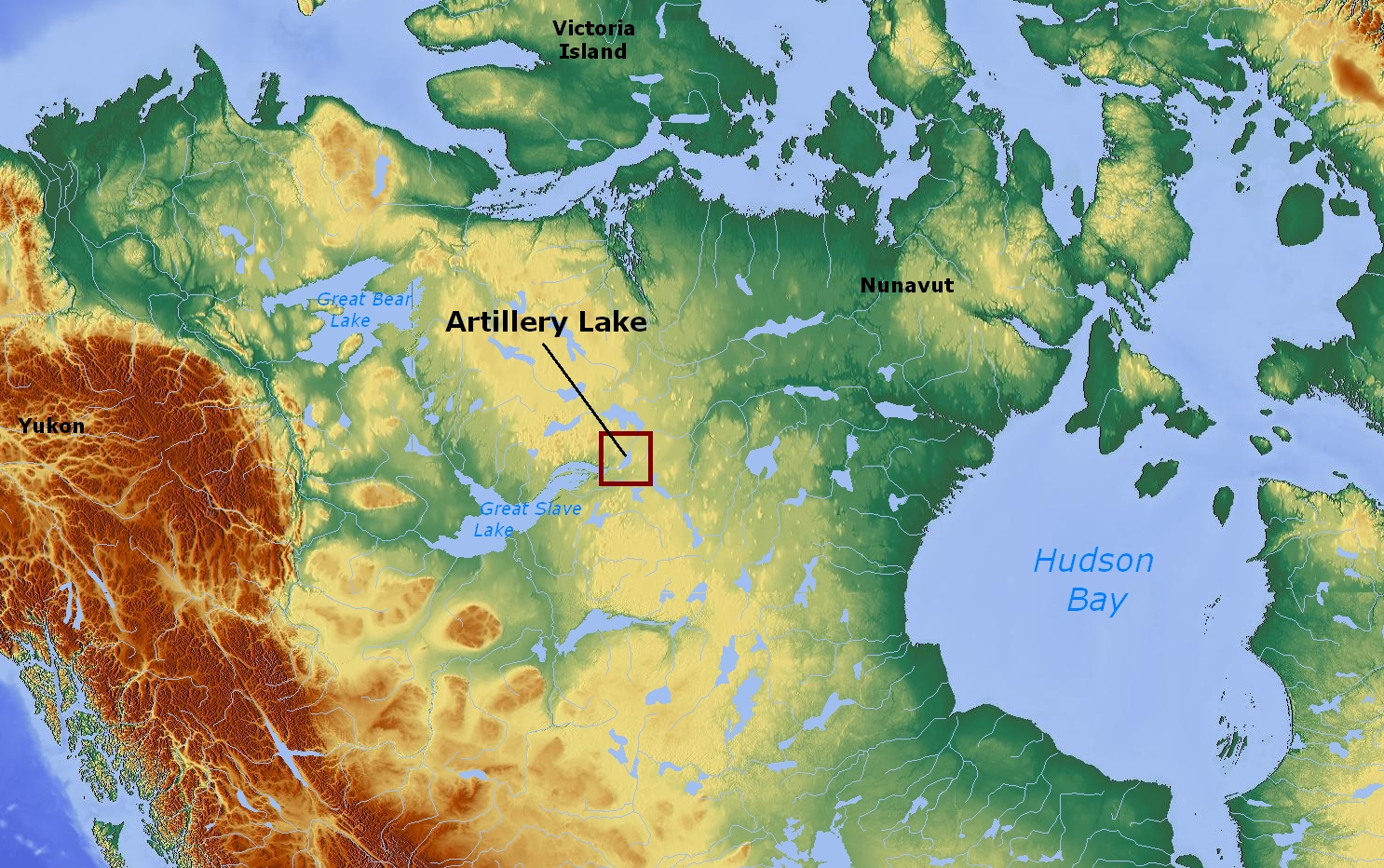

- Location within Canada
- Location: Northwest Territories
- Coordinates: 63°10′N 107°52′W
- Type: Lockhart River
- Primary inflows: Lockhart River
- Basin countries: Canada
- Surface area: 551 km^{2} (213 sq mi)
- Surface elevation: 364 m (1,194 ft)

Artillery Lake is a lake in the Northwest Territories, Canada on the Lockhart River about 20 miles east of Great Slave Lake. George Back reached it in 1834.

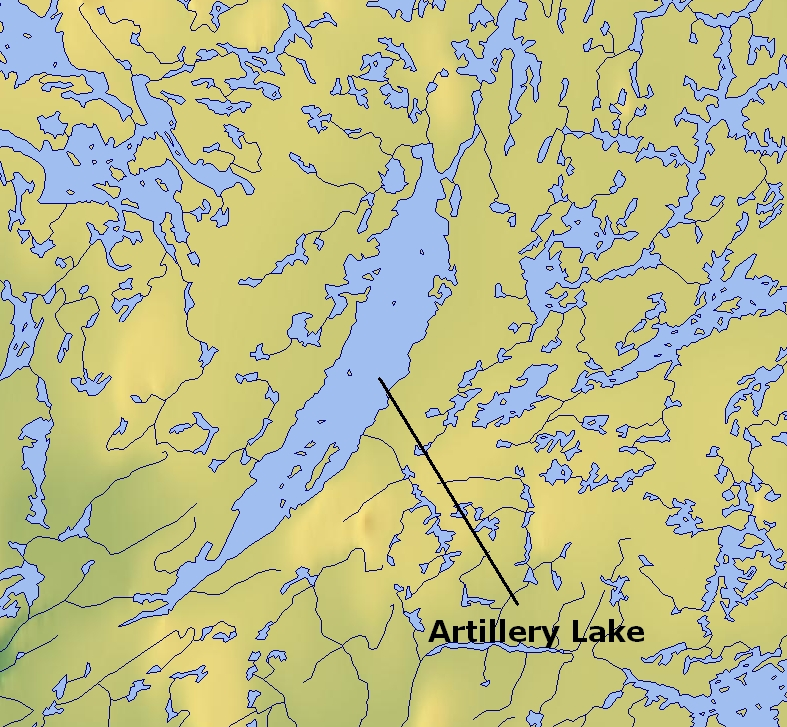
Map

== See also ==
- List of lakes in the Northwest Territories
