= Kendall River =

River in the Northwest Territories, Canada

Coordinates: 67°12′N 116°34′W

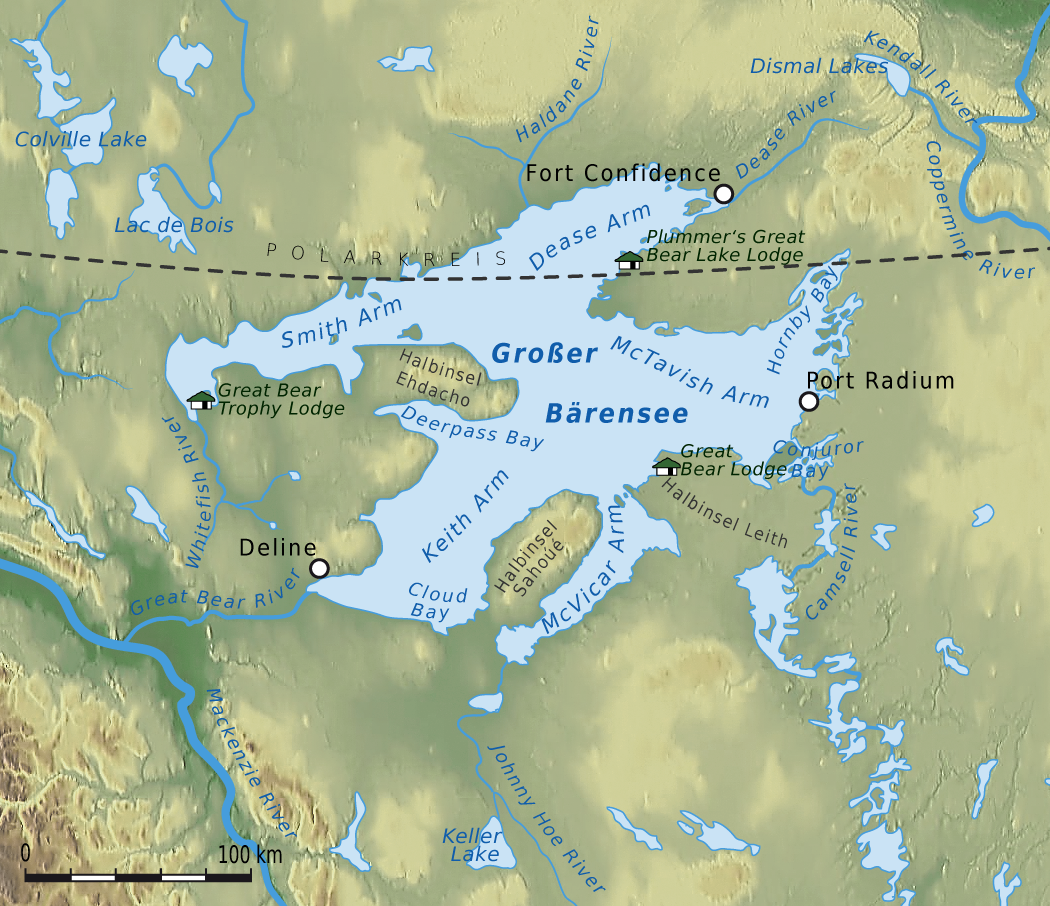
The Kendall River can be seen in the upper right corner of this map of the Great Bear Lake

Kendall River is a small river and tributary to the Coppermine River in the Canadian Northwest Territories that connects the Dismal Lakes to the Coppermine River. John Rae had a base camp here in 1851.

Based on data collected at a gauging station that operated between 1969 and 1990, the river has a drainage area is 2,790 square kilometres (1,077 sq mi), a mean annual flow of 15.0 cubic metres per second (530 cu ft/s), an average peak flow of 189 cubic metres per second (6,674 cu ft/s) and an average low flow of zero, when the river freezes, usually between mid November and late May. Summer flows from the Kendall represent approximately 6% of the flow of the Coppermine River.

== See also ==
- List of rivers of the Northwest Territories
