= Bloody River (Canada) =

- Location in Canada

Location
- Country: Canada

Physical characteristics
- Mouth
  - location: Great Bear Lake

Bloody River is a river of the North American Arctic tundra in Nunavut and the Northwest Territories, Canada. It flows into the Dease Arm of Great Bear Lake in the Northwest Territories at approximately 66°56′01″N 120°34′07″W.

An outcrop of Saline River gypsum was noted near Bloody River, 67°57′N 119°31′W (NTS 86 M)* +27.2 15. W. Kupsch "found tails of till-covered bedrock behind eroded rock bosses and referred to such compound landforms as crag-and-tail drumlins" west of Bloody River.

== See also ==
- List of rivers of the Northwest Territories
- List of rivers of Nunavut
