= Hunt Falls =

Waterfall in Saskatchewan, Canada

- Lefty's Falls
- Interactive map of Hunt Falls
- Location: Northern Administration District, Saskatchewan, Canada
- Coordinates: 59.4776°N 106.4261°W
- Total height: 35 m (115 ft)
- Longest drop: 15 m (49 ft)
- Total width: 60 m (200 ft)
- Run: 3 km (1.9 mi)
- Watercourse: Grease River

Hunt Falls, also known as Lefty's Falls, is a waterfall along the course of the Grease River in Northern Saskatchewan, Canada. With a verticle drop of 15 metres (49 ft), and a width of 60 metres (200 ft), it is the largest waterfall in Saskatchewan.

== Description ==
Hunt Falls is near Grease River's exit from Eagle Rock Lake. When the river leaves the lake, it flows over the 2-metre (6 ft 7 in) high McLeod Falls. Then, 250 metres (820 ft) downstream, the river plunges over the 15-metre (49 ft) high, 60-metre (200 ft) wide Hunt Falls. From the verticle drop, the river continues downstream cascading over steep rapids. In all, the Hunt Falls, which spill over a fault line, have an elevation drop of 35 metres (115 ft) over a 3-kilometre (1.9 mi) span.

== Naming ==
Hunt Falls were originally known as Lefty's Falls. Northern bush pilot Hugh Boswell "Lefty" McLeod discovered the falls while flying his plane in the area in the 1930s. Having discovered the falls, they were unofficially named after him. In 1952, the falls were "officially" named Hunt Falls after William Edward Davis (Bill) Hunt who died during World War II.

In 1979, Minister of Environment Ted Bowerman applied to have the original name of "Lefty's Falls" restored to honour Lefty McLeod. The renaming application was denied but it was decided that a smaller set of falls, 250 metres (820 ft) upstream at the outflow of Eagle Rock Lake, would be named "McLeod Falls" after him instead. In 1980, at the time of the naming, Lefty McLeod was still alive and living in Christopher Lake. People in the region still refer to Hunt Falls as Lefty's Falls.

== See also ==
- List of waterfalls in Canada
