= Aylmer Lake =

Lake in Northwest Territories, Canada

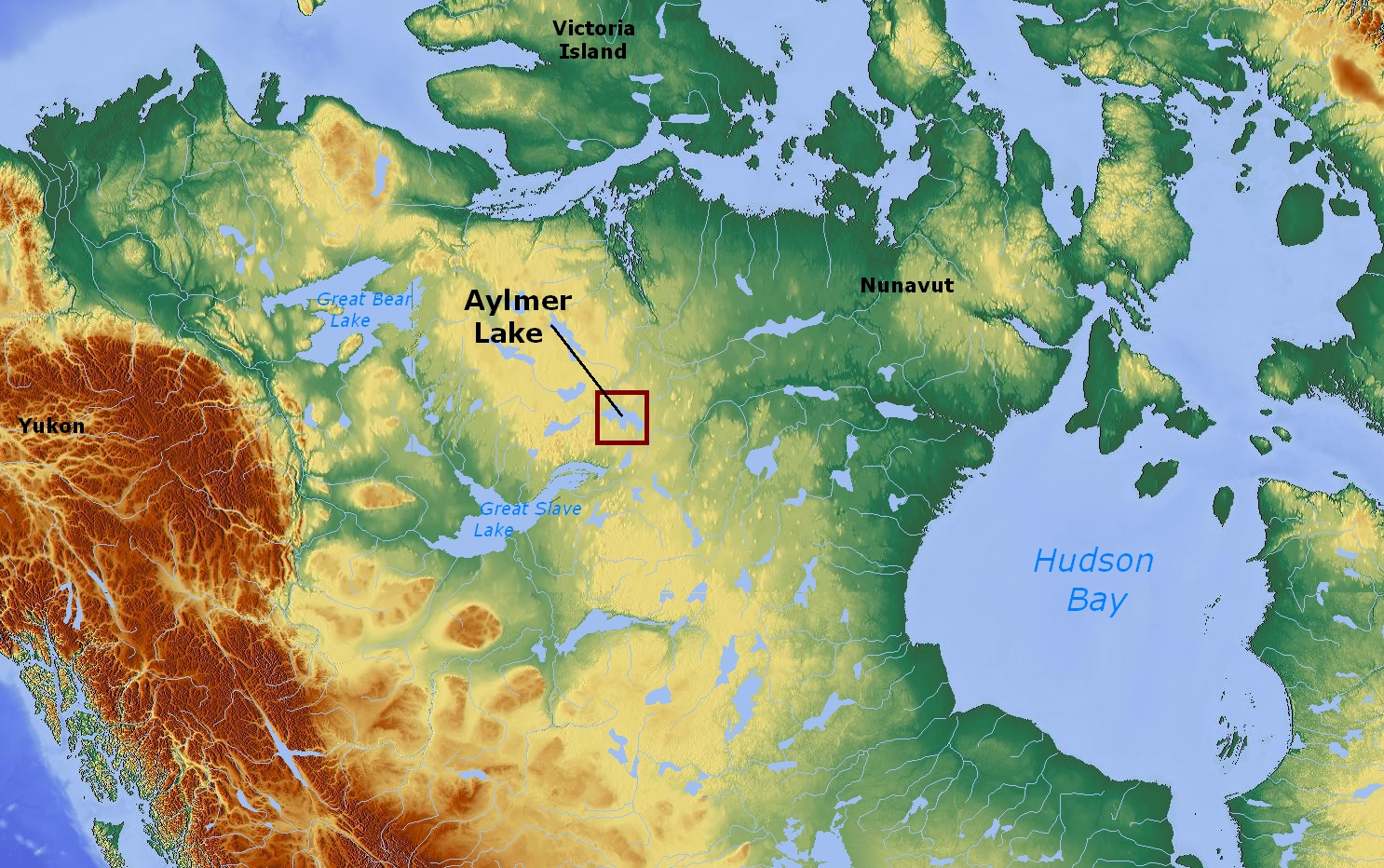

- Location within Canada
- Location: Northwest Territories
- Coordinates: 64°08′N 108°30′W
- Primary inflows: Lockhart River
- Primary outflows: Lockhart River
- Basin countries: Canada
- Surface area: 847 km^{2} (327 sq mi)
- Surface elevation: 375 m (1,230 ft)

Aylmer Lake is a lake along the Lockhart River in the Northwest Territories of Canada. Of lakes in the Northwest Territories, it is the seventh largest.

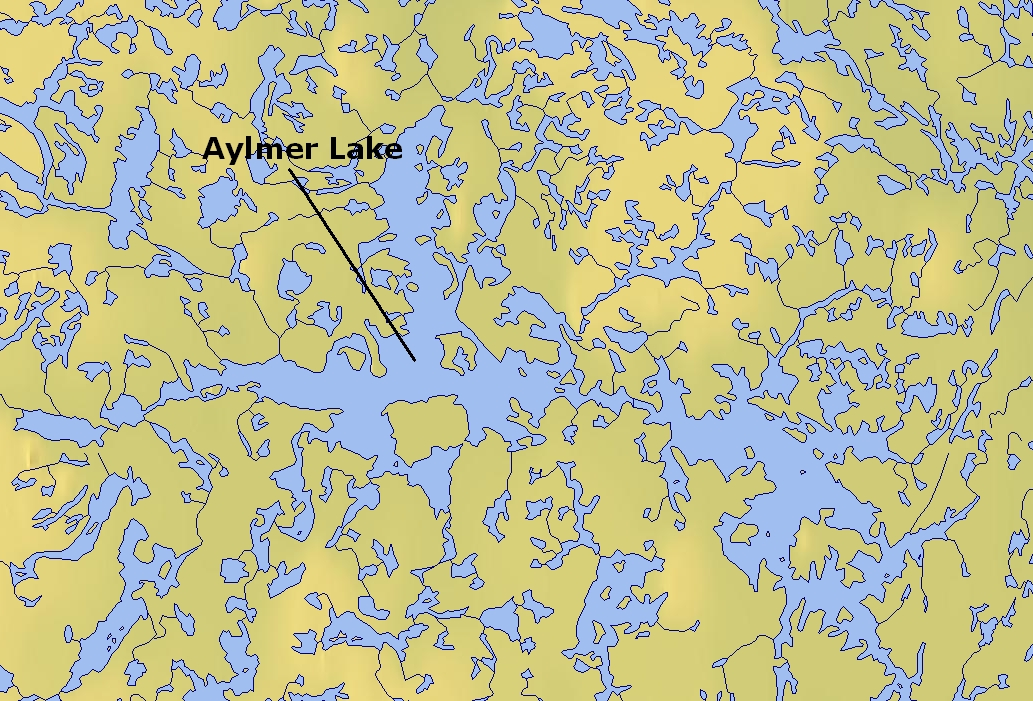
Map

== See also ==
- List of lakes of the Northwest Territories
