= Tsintu River =

River in Northwest Territories, Canada

Coordinates: 66°07′55″N 129°02′31″W

The Tsintu River is a river in the Northwest Territories, Canada. It is a tributary of the Mackenzie River.

== See also ==
- List of rivers of the Northwest Territories
