= Salt River (Canada) =

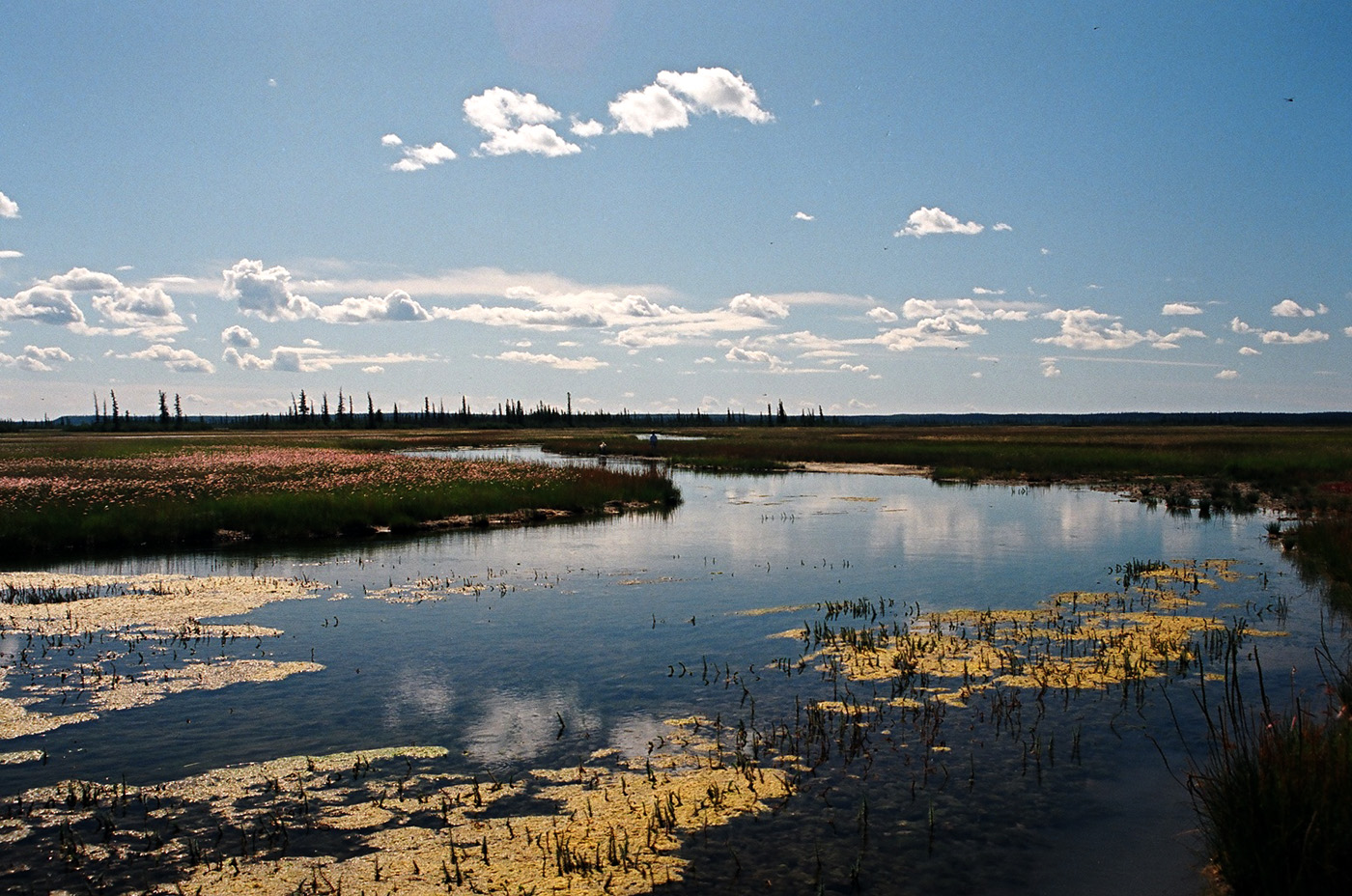

Location
- Country: Canada
- Provinces: Alberta and Northwest Territories

Physical characteristics
- Source: McNeil Lake
  - location: Alberta
  - coordinates: 59°32′33.9″N 112°27′38.7″W
- Mouth: Slave River
  - location: Salt River settlement, Northwest Territories
  - coordinates: 60°06′39.2″N 112°13′54″W

Salt River is a river in Canada whose source is McNeil Lake in Wood Buffalo National Park in northern Alberta. It enters the Slave River north of Fort Smith, Northwest Territories.

The main tributaries are Brine Creek (mouth coordinates 59°56′46.7″N 112°16′14.7″W) and Loop Creek (mouth coordinates 59°39′31.2″N 111°55′14.5″W).

== Salt River settlement ==
At the mouth of the river is a village known as Salt River. It was settled in the latter part of the 18th century. Francois Beaulieu (1771–1872) was its most notable resident. A Roman Catholic mission was in the village from 1850 until 1876 when it moved to Fort Smith.

Salt deposits were collected from the banks during the fur trade era.

== See also ==
- List of rivers of Alberta
- List of rivers of the Northwest Territories
