= Rivière des Rochers =

- Location of mouth within Alberta

Location
- Country: Canada
- Province: Alberta

Physical characteristics
- Source: Lake Athabasca
  - location: Alberta, Canada
- Mouth: Slave River
  - location: Alberta, Canada
  - coordinates: 58°58′53″N 111°24′13″W
- Length: 48 km (30 mi)
- Basin size: 292,496.9 km^{2} (112,933.7 mi^{2})
- Discharge
  - location: Near mouth
  - average: (Period: 1971–2000)1,197.7 m^{3}/s (42,300 cu ft/s)

Basin features
- River system: Mackenzie River

Rivière des Rochers (French for "River of Rocks") is a river in Alberta in the Peace–Athabasca Delta and Wood Buffalo National Park. It is the main outflow of Lake Athabasca and flows northward, around many islands, and meets with the Peace River to form the Slave River. During high water level periods in the late spring and summer, the flow of the Rivière des Rochers can sometimes reverse, with water flowing from the Peace River system back into Lake Athabasca.
