= Fond du Lac 227 =

Indian reserve in Saskatchewan, Canada

Coordinates: 59°20′59″N 107°00′50″W

- Indian reserve
- Fond du Lac Indian Reserve No. 227
- Location in Saskatchewan
- First Nation: Fond du Lac
- Country: Canada
- Province: Saskatchewan

Area
  - Total: 15,520 ha (38,400 acres)

Population (2016)
  - Total: 903
  - Density: 5.82/km^{2} (15.1/sq mi)
- Community Well-Being Index: 52

Fond du Lac 227 is an Indian reserve of the Fond du Lac Denesuline First Nation in Saskatchewan. It is at the east end of Lake Athabasca where the Grease River flows in. In the 2016 Canadian Census, it recorded a population of 903 living in 206 of its 231 total private dwellings. In the same year, its Community Well-Being index was calculated at 52 of 100, compared to 58.4 for the average First Nations community and 77.5 for the average non-Indigenous community.

== See also ==
- List of Indian reserves in Saskatchewan
