= Fond du Lac 229 =

Indian reserve in Saskatchewan, Canada

Coordinates: 59°26′12″N 107°41′52″W

- Indian reserve
- Fond du Lac Indian Reserve No. 229
- Location in Saskatchewan
- First Nation: Fond du Lac
- Country: Canada
- Province: Saskatchewan

Area
  - Total: 7,821.1 ha (19,326 acres)

Fond du Lac 229 is an Indian reserve of the Fond du Lac Denesuline First Nation in Saskatchewan.

== See also ==
- List of Indian reserves in Saskatchewan
