= Fond du Lac Denesuline First Nation =

- Band No. 351
- Gánį Kóé
- People: Denesųłiné
- Treaty: Treaty 8
- Headquarters: Fond du Lac
- Province: Saskatchewan

Land
- Other reserves: Fond du Lac 227; Fond du Lac 228; Fond du Lac 229; Fond du Lac 231; Fond du Lac 232; Fond du Lac 233
- Land area: 368.121 km^{2} (142.132 sq mi)

Population (2019)
- On reserve: 1133
- Off reserve: 995
- Total population: 2128

Tribal Council
- Prince Albert Grand Council

Website
- fonddulac.ca

Fond du Lac Gánį Kóé
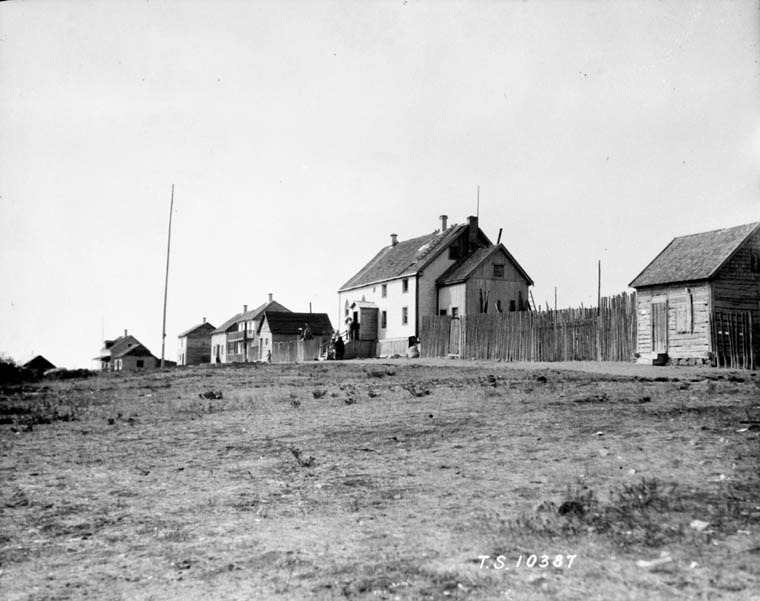
- Fond du Lac main street 1926
- Nickname: fdl
- Location of Fond du Lac in Saskatchewan
- Coordinates: 59°19′12.8″N 107°11′46.9″W
- Country: Canada
- Province: Saskatchewan

Government
  - MLA Athabasca: Buckley Belanger
  - MP Desnethé—Missinippi—Churchill River: Georgina Jolibois

Area
  - Total: 138.26 km^{2} (53.38 sq mi)

Population (2011)
  - Total: 874
  - Density: 6.3/km^{2} (16/sq mi)
- Time zone: UTC−6 (Central Standard Time)
  - Summer (DST): UTC−5
- Postal code: S0J 0W0

Fond du Lac Dene Nation (Chipewyan: Gánį Kóé) is a Dene First Nation located in the boreal forest area of northern Saskatchewan, Canada. The main settlement is Fond-du-Lac, situated on the east side of Lake Athabasca. It is a remote fly-in community. The population in 2011 was 874, mainly of Dene and Métis descent. 705 residents selected Dene as their mother tongue in 2011.

Fond du Lac is a geographic name meaning "far end of the lake" in the French language (literally it translates as "bottom of the lake").

== History ==
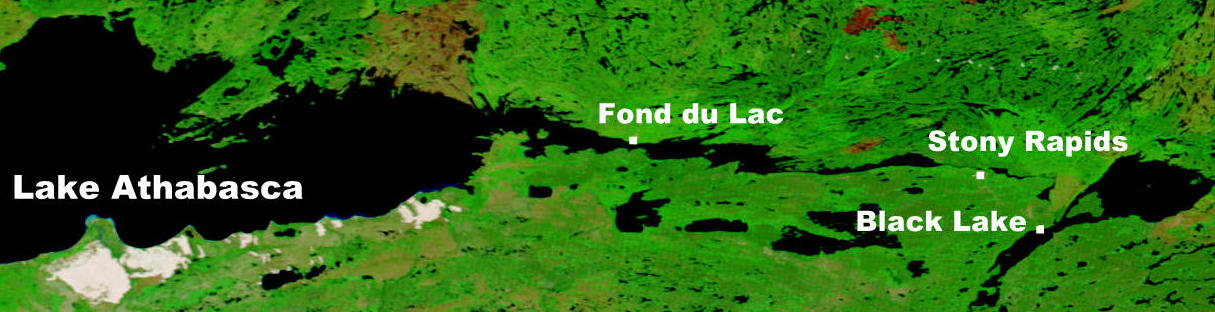
NASA image showing Fond-du-Lac on Lake Athabasca

Founded as a community over 150 years ago, by Denesuline First Nations in pursuit of furs, fishing, hunting and trapping the community has seen little changes. Many in the community can trace their ancestral roots to the early 19th century. "Living off the land" is still a way of life in Fond-du-Lac.

Many of the residents are descendants of the Maurice's Band who signed an adhesion to Treaty 8 in 1899. The Maurice's Band (Chief Maurice Piche's Band) split in 1949 forming the Fond-du-Lac Band and the Black Lake Band.

== Reserves ==
Fond du Lac Dene Nation is a First Nation band government with 6 territories around the eastern area of Lake Athabasca.

- Fond du Lac 227 is 15,520 hectares (38,400 acres) 59.3485°N 106.9729°W on the north shore of Lake Athabasca and contains the village of Fond du Lac.
- Fond du Lac 228 is 1,082.5 hectares (2,675 acres) 59.2999°N 107.2063°W across the lake from the village.
- Fond du Lac 229 is 7,821.1 hectares (19,326 acres) 59.4338°N 107.7124°W west of the village on the north shore of the lake. Population 0 in 2011.
- Fond du Lac 231 is 2,023.5 hectares (5,000 acres) 59.1222°N 107.9026°W borders the Athabasca Sand Dunes Provincial Park on the McFarlane River. Population 0 in 2011.
- Fond du Lac 232 is 2,023.5 hectares (5,000 acres) 59.1410°N 107.4107°W on the Otherside River east of Fond du Lac 231. Population 0 in 2011.
- Fond du Lac 233 is 8,341.5 hectares (20,612 acres) 59.2764°N 107.2757°W on the south side of the lake surrounding Fond du Lac 228. Population 0 in 2011.

Fond du Lac had a total registered membership of 1,895 with 1,066 members residing on-reserve and 829 members residing at locations off-reserve in September 2013. The Fond du Lac First Nation is a member of the Prince Albert Grand Council.

== Demographics ==
Canada census – Fond du Lac 227 community profile

	2021	2011
Population	926 (+2.5% from 2016)	874 (+9.1% from 2006)
Land area	125.45 km^{2} (48.44 sq mi)	138.26 km^{2} (53.38 sq mi)
Population density	7.4/km^{2} (19/sq mi)	6.3/km^{2} (16/sq mi)
Median age	25.6 (M: 25.6, F: 25.2)	22.9 (M: 22.3, F: 23.4)
Private dwellings	260 (total) 238 (occupied)	229 (total)
Median household income	$69,500

References: 2021 2011

== Economy ==
The main enterprise today in Fond du Lac is working in the mineral and other resource extraction business. Others follow a tradition of fishing, hunting, and trapping as well as providing guide services to the many fishing camps in the area.

== Transportation ==
There are minimal roads within the community and no year-round roads to the community. It is only accessible by air (through the Fond-du-Lac Airport), inland water transport and snowmobile. Common transportation for community members includes driving large trucks and ATVs better known as four wheelers. In the winter there is a seasonal ice road with access to Uranium City and Stony Rapids (with the latter community in turn connected to the rest of the province via another ice road). The community greatly relies on aircraft and barges for supplies and services. In the winter the occasional truck will venture in on the ice road with supplies.

== Climate ==
Fond-du-Lac has a typical northern Saskatchewan subarctic climate (Köppen Dfc) with long, frigid winters and short, mild to warm summers.

Climate data for Fond-du-Lac
Month	Jan	Feb	Mar	Apr	May	Jun	Jul	Aug	Sep	Oct	Nov	Dec	Year
Mean daily maximum °C (°F)	−24 (−11)	−20 (−4)	−12 (10)	0 (32)	9 (48)	17 (62)	20 (68)	18 (64)	11 (51)	2 (35)	−9 (15)	−17 (2)	0 (31)
Daily mean °C (°F)	−28 (−18)	−25 (−13)	−18 (0)	−6 (21)	4 (39)	11 (51)	15 (59)	13 (55)	7 (44)	0 (32)	−12 (10)	−23 (−9)	−5 (23)
Mean daily minimum °C (°F)	−32 (−25)	−30 (−22)	−24 (−11)	−12 (10)	−1 (30)	5 (41)	10 (50)	8 (46)	2 (35)	−3 (26)	−15 (5)	−26 (−14)	−10 (14)
Average precipitation mm (inches)	20 (0.8)	15 (0.6)	18 (0.7)	18 (0.7)	20 (0.8)	36 (1.4)	51 (2.0)	48 (1.9)	36 (1.4)	33 (1.3)	28 (1.1)	20 (0.8)	343 (13.5)
Source: http://www.weatherbase.com/weather/weather.php3?s=710762
