= Lockhart River (Northwest Territories) =

Location
- Country: Canada
- Territory: Northwest Territories

Physical characteristics
- Source
  - location: Mackay Lake, southern Northwest Territories
  - elevation: 416 metres (1,365 ft)
- Mouth
  - location: Great Slave Lake
  - coordinates: 62°48′03″N 108°54′13″W
  - elevation: 156 metres (512 ft)
- Discharge
  - average: 195 m^{3} (6,900 ft^{3})

The Lockhart River is a river in the Northwest Territories, Canada. The river begins at eastern end of Mackay Lake and flows east through Aylmer Lake into Clinton-Golden Lake, where it turns southward into Artillery Lake and the southeastward into Great Slave Lake. The final stretch between Artillery Lake and Great Slave Lake has many rapids and waterfalls, of which Parry Falls is the most notable.
