= Castel Bay =

Bay in the Northwest Territories, Canada

- Location within Northwest Territories
- Location: M'Clure Strait
- Coordinates: 74°12′02″N 119°35′11″W
- Ocean/sea sources: Arctic Ocean
- Basin countries: Canada
- Settlements: Uninhabited

Castel Bay is a Canadian Arctic waterway in the Northwest Territories. It is a southern arm of M'Clure Strait on northeast Banks Island. The mouth of the larger Mercy Bay is less than 20 km (12 mi) to the east.These bays are a part of Aulavik National Park.

It is named by Vilhjalmur Stefansson in honour of Arctic explorer Aarnout Castel.
