= Fond du Lac 231 =

Indian reserve in Saskatchewan, Canada

Coordinates: 59°07′20″N 107°54′10″W

- Indian reserve
- Fond du Lac Indian Reserve No. 231
- Location in Saskatchewan
- First Nation: Fond du Lac
- Country: Canada
- Province: Saskatchewan

Area
  - Total: 2,023.5 ha (5,000 acres)

Fond du Lac 231 is an Indian reserve of the Fond du Lac Denesuline First Nation in Saskatchewan.

== See also ==
- List of Indian reserves in Saskatchewan
