= Great Bear River =

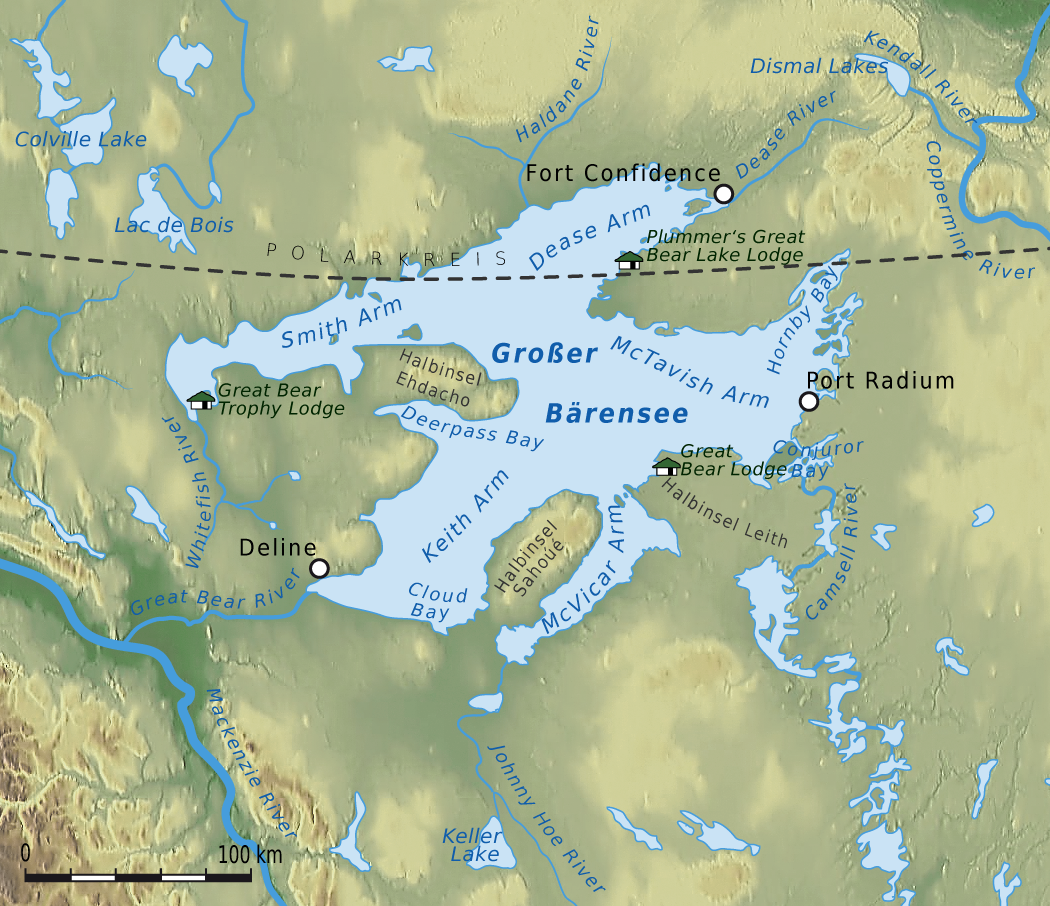
- Great Bear River exits Great Bear Lake near Délı̨nę
- Native name: Sahtúdé (Slavey)

Location
- Country: Canada

Physical characteristics
- Source
  - location: Great Bear Lake, Northwest Territories, Canada
  - coordinates: 65°08′03″N 123°30′45″W
  - elevation: 186 m (610 ft)
- Mouth: Mackenzie River
  - location: Tulita, Northwest Territories, Canada
  - coordinates: 64°54′21″N 125°36′12″W
  - elevation: 60 m (200 ft)
- Length: 113 km (70 mi)
- Basin size: 156,500 km^{2} (60,400 sq mi)
- Discharge
  - location: Mackenzie River
  - average: 528 m^{3}/s (18,600 cu ft/s)
  - maximum: 995 m^{3}/s (35,100 cu ft/s)

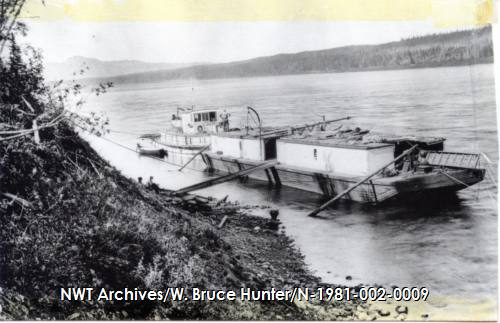
Barge traffic on the Great Bear River, in 1933.

The 113-kilometre-long (70 mi) Great Bear River, which drains the Great Bear Lake westward through marshes into the Mackenzie River, forms an important transportation link during its four ice-free months. It originates at south-west bay of the lake. The river has an irregular meander pattern 350-metre-wide (1,150 ft) channel with average depth 6 metres (20 ft). Historic air photos show no evidence of bank erosion or channel migration in a 50-year period.

The low discharge rate is due to a small amount of precipitation in watershed area. Great Bear River contained open reaches that had melted out in place over 80 percent of its length in 1972 and 1974.

The settlement of Tulita is located at the mouth of the river.

== Ecology ==
Great Bear River hosts a number of aquatic species, with some of the most notable being lake trout and lake whitefish. Other animals regularly found in the Great Bear River include various fish species such as Arctic grayling, burbot, Cisco (lake herring), northern pike, nelma (inconnu), walleye, fourhorn sculpin, slimy sculpin, round whitefish, longnose sucker, Sphaeriidae molluscs, and opossum shrimp; amphibians such as the wood frog; mammals such as the North American river otter and North American beaver; and amphipods such as gammarus lacustris, and pontoporia affinis. Chum salmon have also been reported and verified in both Great Bear Lake and the Great Bear River.

== Tributaries ==
The tributaries of the Great Bear River include:

- Porcupine River
- Rosalie Creek
- Stick Creek
- Wolverine Creek
- St. Charles Creek
- Brackett River

== See also ==
- List of rivers of the Northwest Territories
