= Slave River =

River in Alberta and Northwest Territories, Canada

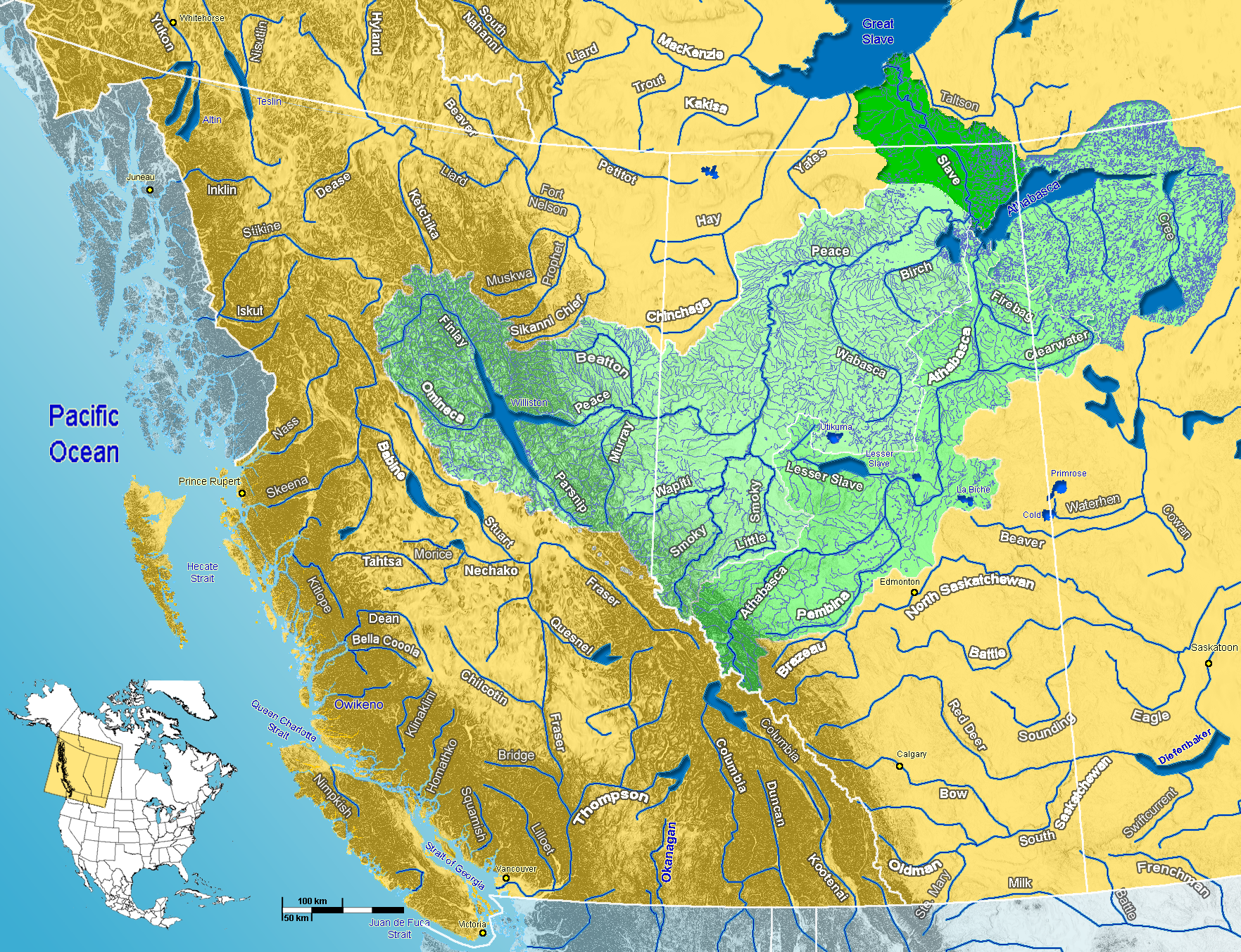
- Slave River Watershed

Location
- Country: Canada

Physical characteristics
- Source
  - location: Peace–Athabasca Delta
  - coordinates: 58.99793°N 111.40906°W
  - elevation: 210 m (690 ft)
- Mouth
  - location: Great Slave Lake
  - coordinates: 61.28019°N 113.58798°W
  - elevation: 160 m (520 ft)
- Length: 434 km (270 mi)
- Basin size: 616,400 km^{2} (238,000 sq mi)
- Discharge
  - average: 3,414 m^{3}/s (120,600 cu ft/s); max: 7,930 m^{3}/s (280,000 cu ft/s); min: 543 m^{3}/s (19,200 cu ft/s) (for Fitzgerald, Alberta)

The Slave River is a Canadian river that flows from the confluence of the Rivière des Rochers and Peace River in northeastern Alberta and runs into Great Slave Lake in the Northwest Territories. The river's name is thought to derive from the name for the Slavey group of the Dene First Nations, Deh Gah Gotʼine, in the Athabaskan languages. The Chipewyan had displaced other native people from this region.

== Rapids and kayaking ==
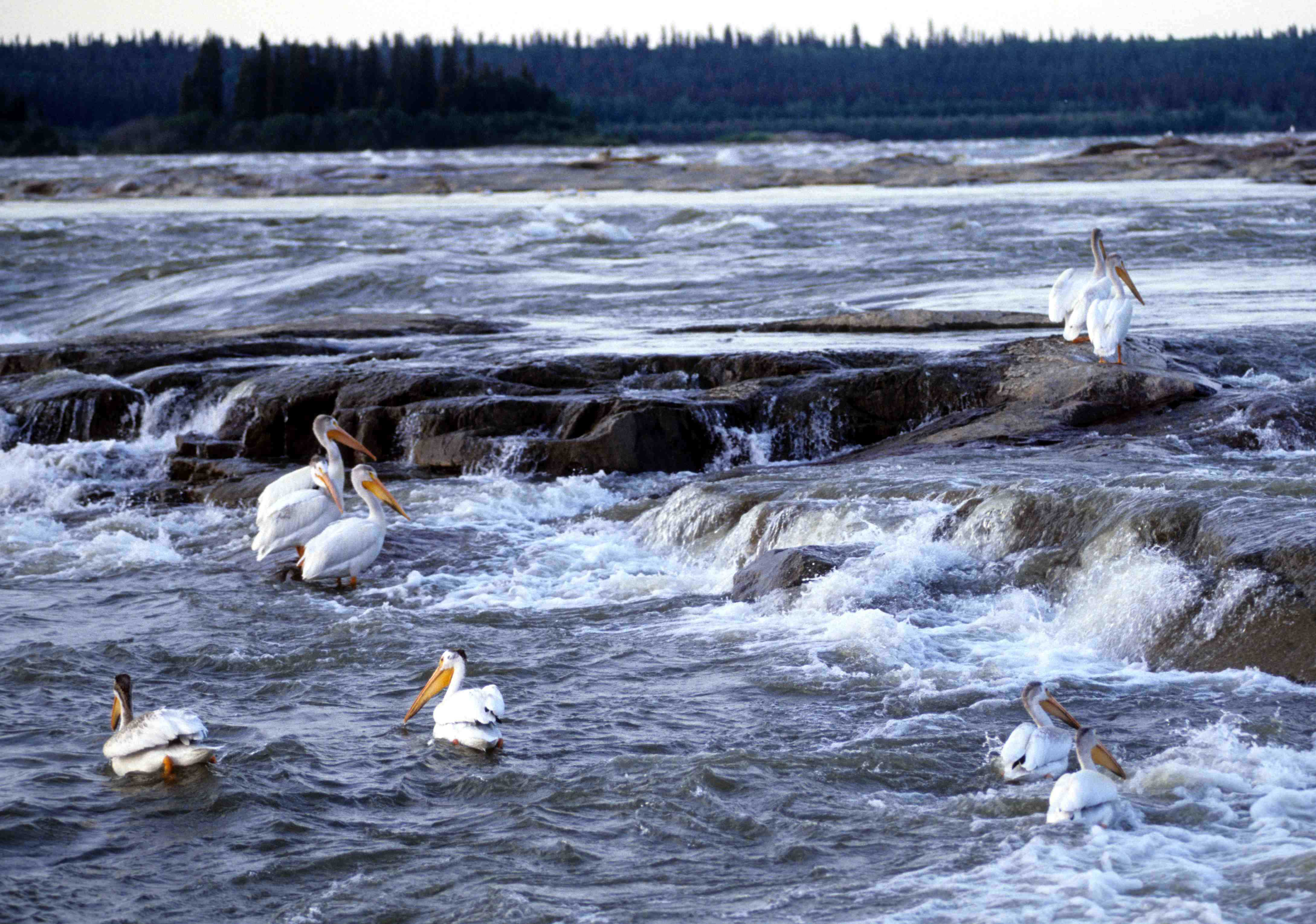
American white pelicans on the Slave River at the Rapids of the Drowned, near Fort Smith

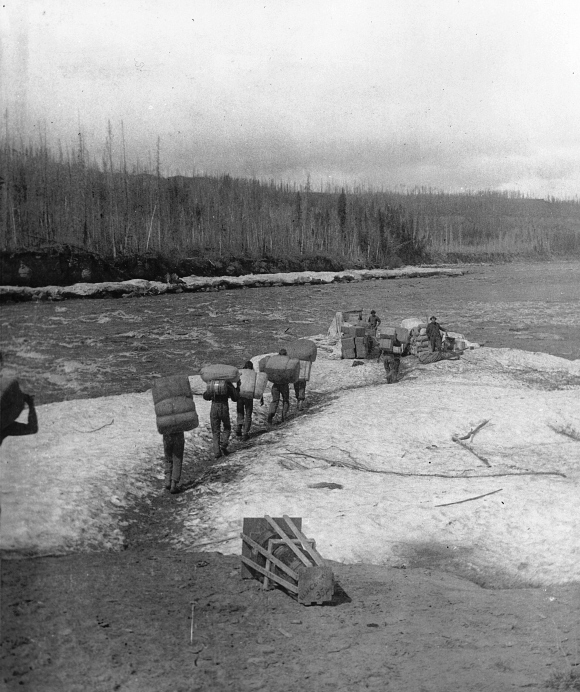
Portaging along the Slave River in 1900

The Slave River and the rapids surrounding Fort Smith are known for whitewater kayaking. The river consists of four sets of named rapids: Pelican, Rapids of the Drowned, Mountain Portage, and Cassette. The rapids range in their difficulty to traverse, ranked from Class I to Class VI according to the International Scale of River Difficulty. Huge volume, massive waves, and the home of the northernmost river pelican colony in North America characterize this river. These islands serve as a sanctuary to the birds and are closed to human traffic from April 15 to September 15.

Crossing the Slave River has proven to be fatal; the earliest recorded fatalities as a part of Cuthbert Grant's expedition of 1786 at the Rapids of the Drowned (a class II-IV rapid set).

== Course ==
The Slave River originates in the Peace-Athabasca Delta, at the forks of Peace River and Rivière des Rochers, which drains the Athabasca River and Lake Athabasca. The Slave River flows north into the Northwest Territories and into the Great Slave Lake north of Fort Resolution. From there the water reaches the Arctic Ocean through the Mackenzie River.

The river is 434 kilometres (270 mi) long and has a cumulative drainage area of 616,400 square kilometres (238,000 mi^{2}).

== Portage and navigation ==
Prior to the extension of railway service to Hay River, Northwest Territories, a river port on Great Slave Lake, cargo shipment on the Slave River was an important transport route. Locally built wooden vessels were navigating the river into the late 19th century. The rapids required a portage of 26 kilometres (16 mi). Tractors were imported from Germany to assist in the transport of goods around the rapids. Tugs and barges of the Northern Transportation Company's "Radium Line" were constructed in the south and disassembled. The parts were then shipped by rail to Waterways, Alberta, shipped by barge to the portage, and portaged to the lower river for reassembly, where they could navigate most of the rest of the extensive Mackenzie River basin.

== Tributaries ==
- Peace-Athabasca Delta
  - Athabasca River
  - Lake Athabasca
  - Rivière des Rochers
  - Chilloneys Creek
  - Revillon Coupe
  - Dempsey Creek
  - Peace River
  - Scow Channel
  - Murdock Creek
  - Darough Creek
- Powder Creek
- La Butte Creek
- Hornaday River
- Salt River
- Little Buffalo River

== See also ==
- List of rivers of Alberta
- List of rivers of the Northwest Territories
