= Great Bear Lake =

Large glacial lake in Northwest Territories, Canada

- Sahtú (Slavey); Grand lac de l'Ours (French)
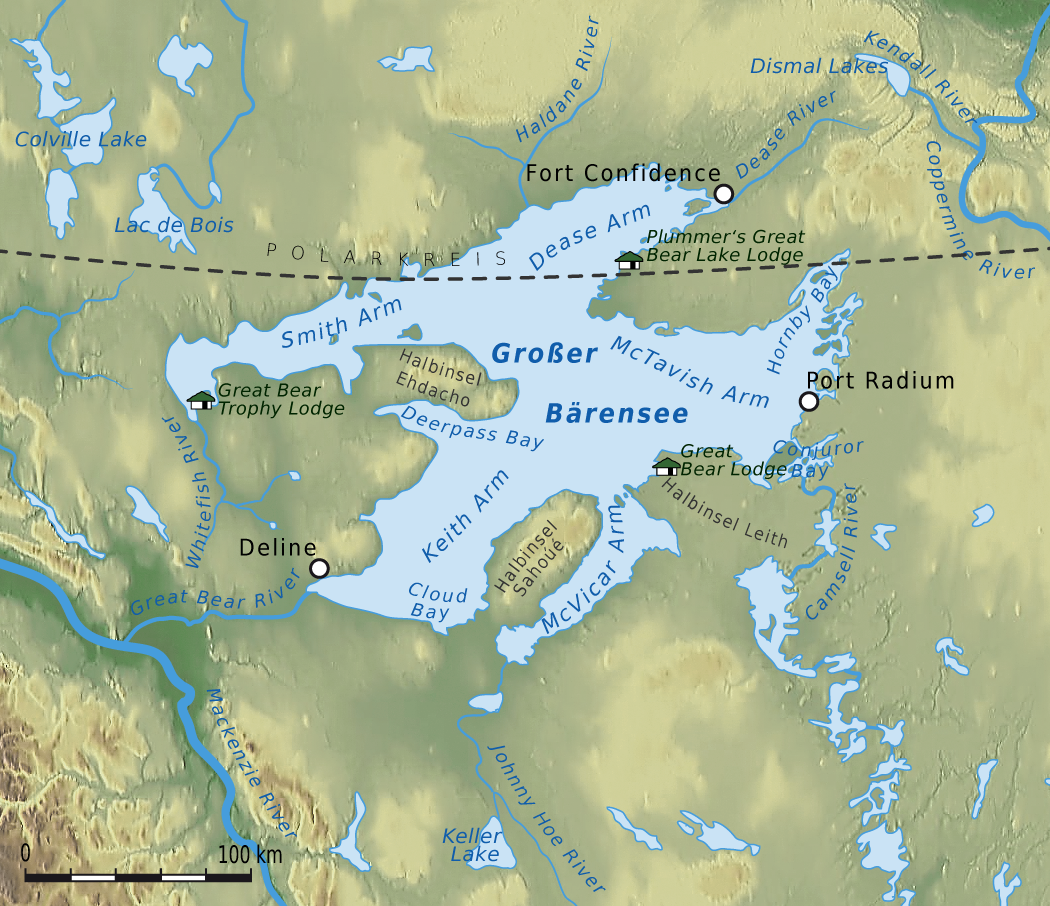
- Great Bear Lake, Northwest Territories

- Location within Northwest Territories
- Location: Northwest Territories
- Coordinates: 65°50′01″N 120°45′06″W
- Lake type: Glacial
- Primary outflows: Great Bear River
- Catchment area: 114,717 km^{2} (44,292 sq mi)
- Basin countries: Canada
- Surface area: 31,153 km^{2} (12,028 sq mi)
- Average depth: 71.7 m (235 ft)
- Max. depth: 446 m (1,463 ft)
- Water volume: 2,234 km^{3} (536 cu mi)
- Residence time: 124 years
- Shore length^{1}: 2,719 km (1,690 mi) (plus 824 km (512 mi) island shoreline)
- Surface elevation: 156 m (512 ft)
- Frozen: November - July
- Islands: 26 main islands, totalling 759.3 km^{2} (293.2 sq mi) in area
- Settlements: Délı̨nę
- ^{1} Shore length is not a well-defined measure.

Great Bear Lake (North Slavey: Sahtú; French: Grand lac de l'Ours) in the boreal forest of Canada is the largest lake entirely in Canada (Lake Superior and Lake Huron are larger but straddle the Canada–US border), the fourth-largest in North America, and the eighth-largest in the world. The lake is in the Northwest Territories, on the Arctic Circle between 65 and 67 degrees of northern latitude and between 118 and 123 degrees western longitude, 156 m (512 ft) above sea level. It drains into the Great Bear River, thence into the Mackenzie River.

The name originated from the Chipewyan word satudene, meaning "grizzly bear-water people". The Sahtu, a Dene people, are named after the lake. Grizzly Bear Mountain, or Sahoyue, on the shore of the lake also comes from Chipewyan, meaning "bear-large hill".

Sahoyue (Grizzly Bear Mountain), a peninsula on the south side of the lake, and Edacho (Scented Grass Hills), another peninsula on the west side, form the Saoyú-ʔehdacho National Historic Site of Canada.

== Geography ==
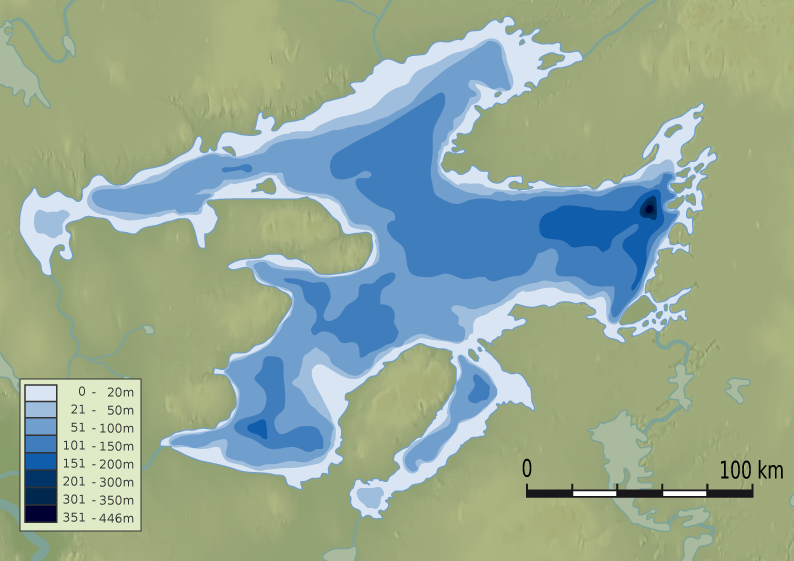
Bathymetric map of Great Bear Lake.

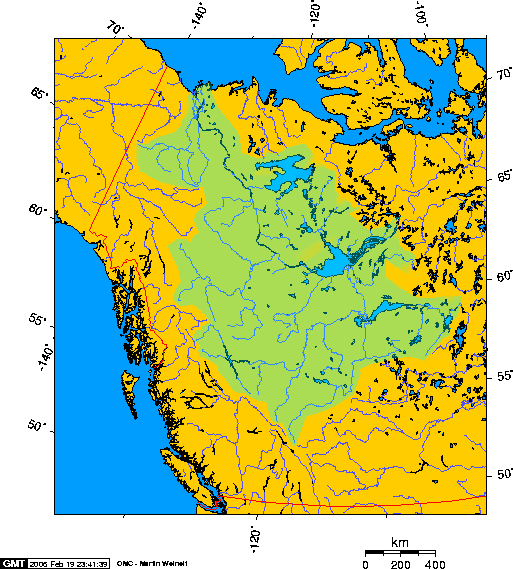
Mackenzie River drainage basin showing Great Bear Lake's position in the Western Canadian Arctic

The lake has a surface area of 31,153 km^{2} (12,028 sq mi) and a volume of 2,234 km^{3} (536 cu mi). Its maximum depth is 446 m (1,463 ft) and average depth 71.7 m (235 ft). The shoreline is 2,719 km (1,690 mi) and the catchment area of the lake is 114,717 km^{2} (44,292 sq mi). Great Bear Lake is covered with ice from late November to July.

The lake is known for its considerable clarity. Explorer John Franklin wrote in 1828 that a white rag placed in the water did not disappear until it exceeded a depth of 15 fathoms (90 ft; 27 m).

=== Arms ===
Arms of Great Bear Lake include the Smith Arm (northwest), the Dease Arm (northeast), the McTavish Arm (southeast), the McVicar Arm (south) and the Keith Arm (southwest). The community of Délı̨nę is located on the Keith Arm near the outflow of the Great Bear River that flows west into the Mackenzie River at Tulita.

=== Tributaries ===
Rivers flowing into Great Bear Lake include the Whitefish River, Big Spruce River, Haldane River, Bloody River, Sloan River, Dease River and the Johnny Hoe River.

== Geology and geomorphology ==
Great Bear Lake lies between two major physiographic regions: the Kazan Uplands portion of the Canadian Shield and the Interior Plains. It was part of glacial Lake McConnell in the pre-glacial valleys reshaped by ice erosion during the Pleistocene. Since, the lake has changed from post-glacial rebound following the ice melting. Precambrian rocks of the Canadian Shield form the eastern margin of the McTavish Arm. These rocks of the Precambrian are sedimentary and metamorphic deposits supplemented by igneous intrusions forming dikes and sills.

== Climate ==
Climate data for Délı̨nę (Déline CS) WMO ID: 71503; coordinates 65°12′31″N 123°26′00″W; elevation: 212.8 m (698 ft); 1991–2020 normals. (Note: Composite data included from Déline Airport: Climate ID: 22010KA / 2201023; coordinates 65°12′40″N 123°26′11″W; elevation: 214.3 m (703 ft))
Month	Jan	Feb	Mar	Apr	May	Jun	Jul	Aug	Sep	Oct	Nov	Dec	Year
Record high humidex	11.1	5.0	14.3	16.2	24.4	30.8	33.3	32.6	25.4	20.1	3.8	4.0	33.3
Record high °C (°F)	4.0 (39.2)	5.1 (41.2)	14.7 (58.5)	16.3 (61.3)	24.8 (76.6)	30.2 (86.4)	31.4 (88.5)	32.0 (89.6)	24.0 (75.2)	20.8 (69.4)	4.8 (40.6)	5.6 (42.1)	32.0 (89.6)
Mean daily maximum °C (°F)	−20.6 (−5.1)	−17.9 (−0.2)	−12.8 (9.0)	−2.0 (28.4)	8.4 (47.1)	17.0 (62.6)	19.6 (67.3)	16.8 (62.2)	10.2 (50.4)	−0.3 (31.5)	−11.5 (11.3)	−18.2 (−0.8)	−0.9 (30.4)
Daily mean °C (°F)	−24.7 (−12.5)	−22.8 (−9.0)	−18.7 (−1.7)	−7.8 (18.0)	3.2 (37.8)	10.7 (51.3)	13.4 (56.1)	11.3 (52.3)	5.5 (41.9)	−3.4 (25.9)	−15.6 (3.9)	−22.3 (−8.1)	−5.9 (21.4)
Mean daily minimum °C (°F)	−28.8 (−19.8)	−27.6 (−17.7)	−24.5 (−12.1)	−13.8 (7.2)	−2.1 (28.2)	4.4 (39.9)	7.3 (45.1)	6.0 (42.8)	1.0 (33.8)	−6.5 (20.3)	−19.6 (−3.3)	−26.3 (−15.3)	−10.9 (12.4)
Record low °C (°F)	−49.1 (−56.4)	−45.9 (−50.6)	−44.1 (−47.4)	−35.0 (−31.0)	−23.3 (−9.9)	−6.9 (19.6)	−1.8 (28.8)	−4.9 (23.2)	−13.3 (8.1)	−29.7 (−21.5)	−37.4 (−35.3)	−43.6 (−46.5)	−49.1 (−56.4)
Record low wind chill	−55.9	−53.7	−53.7	−41.7	−30.9	−8.6	−3.2	−8.3	−15.8	−30.8	−44.0	−52.4	−55.9
Average precipitation mm (inches)	11.8 (0.46)	11.7 (0.46)	9.5 (0.37)	11.0 (0.43)	14.7 (0.58)	23.7 (0.93)	40.2 (1.58)	42.9 (1.69)	38.6 (1.52)	31.7 (1.25)	21.6 (0.85)	11.9 (0.47)	269.2 (10.60)
Average rainfall mm (inches)	0.0 (0.0)	0.0 (0.0)	0.0 (0.0)	0.2 (0.01)	12.7 (0.50)	23.5 (0.93)	39.9 (1.57)	—	38.5 (1.52)	—	0.3 (0.01)	0.0 (0.0)	—
Average snowfall cm (inches)	13.4 (5.3)	16.2 (6.4)	15.1 (5.9)	12.1 (4.8)	3.0 (1.2)	0.3 (0.1)	0.0 (0.0)	0.0 (0.0)	2.1 (0.8)	—	34.5 (13.6)	17.6 (6.9)	—
Average precipitation days (≥ 0.2 mm)	6.1	8.0	7.6	5.2	6.5	8.5	10.7	12.2	12.3	12.9	10.2	7.8	108.1
Average rainy days (≥ 0.2 mm)	0.0	0.0	0.0	0.3	4.9	8.1	10.5	—	12.0	—	0.1	0.0	—
Average snowy days (≥ 0.2 cm)	7.0	8.5	9.0	4.7	1.6	0.2	0.0	0.0	0.9	—	11.5	9.3	—
Average relative humidity (%) (at 1500 LST)	76.7	70.9	59.9	56.8	55.5	52.5	55.8	62.5	65.7	81.1	83.7	80.5	66.8
Source: Environment and Climate Change Canada

== Human use ==
The community of Délı̨nę is on the lake, near the headwaters of the Great Bear River. There is an ice crossing from Délı̨nę to the winter road on the far side of the Great Bear River.

On 5 March 2016, a tank truck fell partway through the ice road just a few days after the government had increased the allowed maximum weight limit to 40,000 kg (88,000 lb) on the road. The truck, which was 3 km (1.9 mi) outside of Délı̨nę and close to the community's fresh water intake, as well as a major fishing area, contained approximately 30,000 L (6,600 imp gal; 7,900 US gal) of heating fuel and was one of 70 truck loads intended to resupply the community. The fuel was removed from the truck by 2 am, 8 March.

Three lodges around the lake are destinations for fishing and hunting. In 1995, a 32.65 kg (72.0 lb) lake trout was caught, the largest ever caught anywhere by angling.

=== Mining ===
In 1930, Gilbert LaBine discovered uranium deposits in the Great Bear Lake region. The former mining area Port Radium, site of the Eldorado Mine, where pitchblende was discovered, was located on the eastern shore. Echo Bay Mines Limited leased the old camp and mill at Port Radium to recover silver and copper values from 1965 to 1981.

== Cultural significance ==
=== Prophecy ===
Great Bear Lake is paramount in the Délı̨nę peoples' identity, laws and culture. Hence, conserving it is critical for the Délı̨nę people. ɂehtsǝ́o Erǝ́ya, a Dene Elder, is widely regarded as a prophet, making over 30 prophecies which have been interpreted as having come true. His prediction for the end of times claims that, as the world dries up, the little remaining life will flock to and end on the banks of the Great Bear Lake, a lake seen as a physical beating heart to humanity. The Délı̨nę people have followed these prophecies closely, the cultural considerations being a driving force for self-governance and environmental sustainability.

== Gallery ==
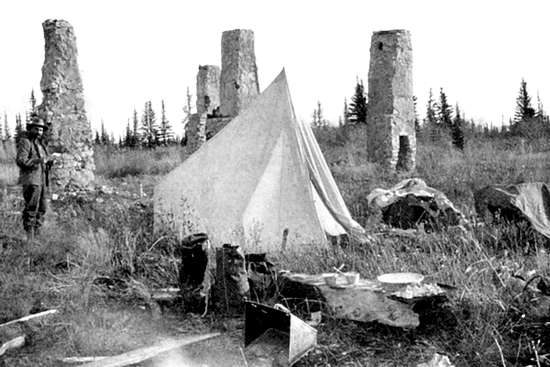
Ruins of Fort Confidence at the mouth of the Dease River in 1911

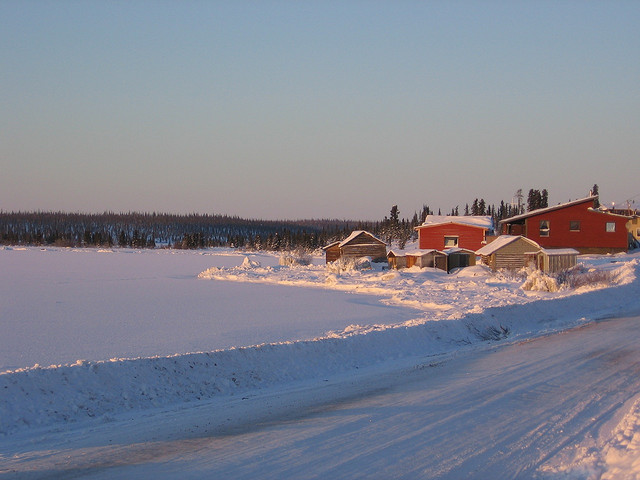
The community of Délı̨nę on Great Bear Lake

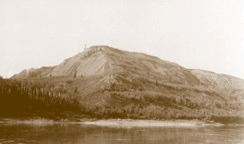
Grizzly Bear Mountain, Great Bear Lake

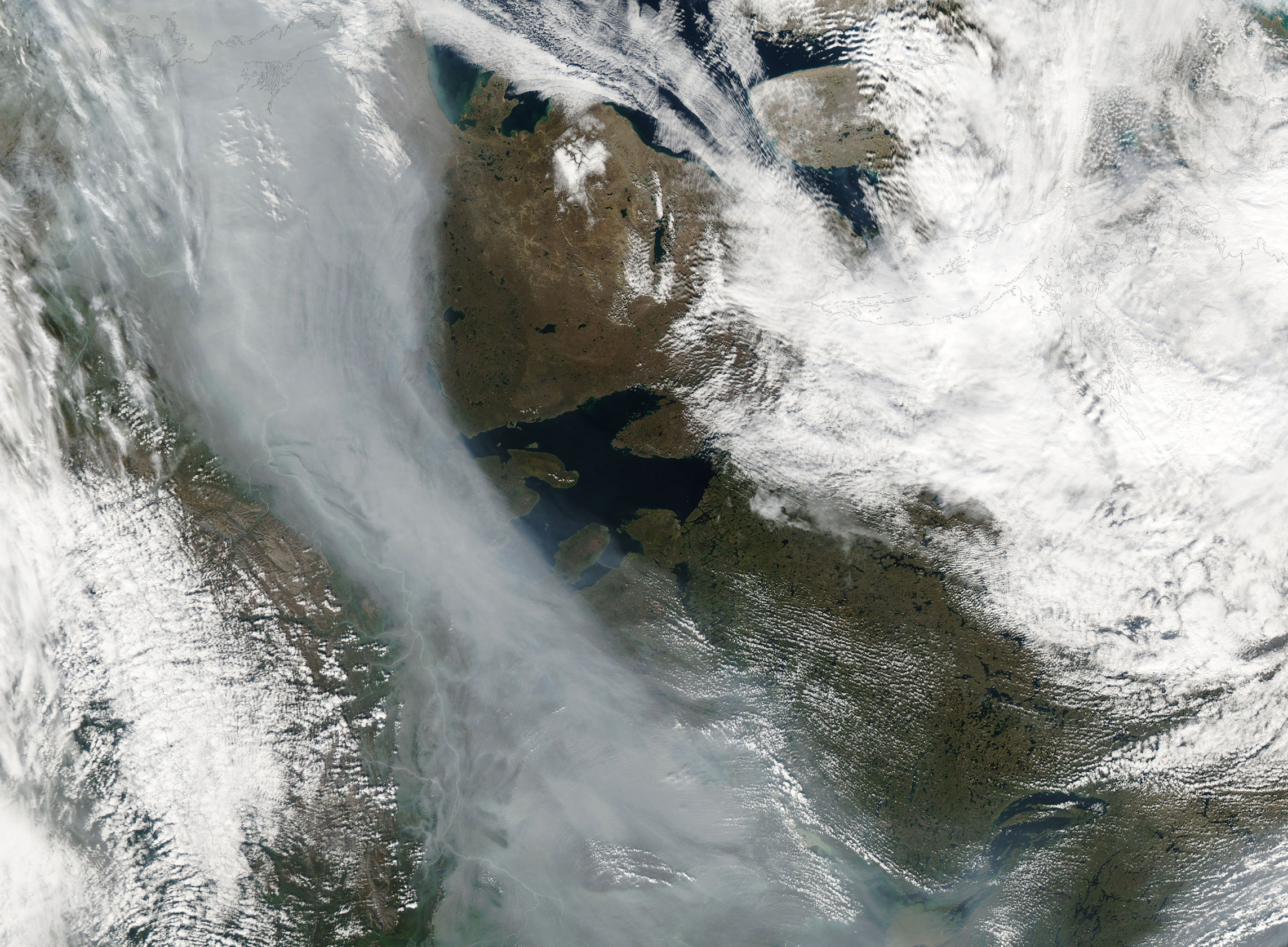
Smoke from forest fires in Alaska blows over Great Bear Lake

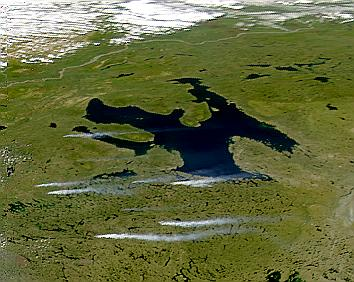
Great Bear Lake. Note the smoke plumes from wildfires
