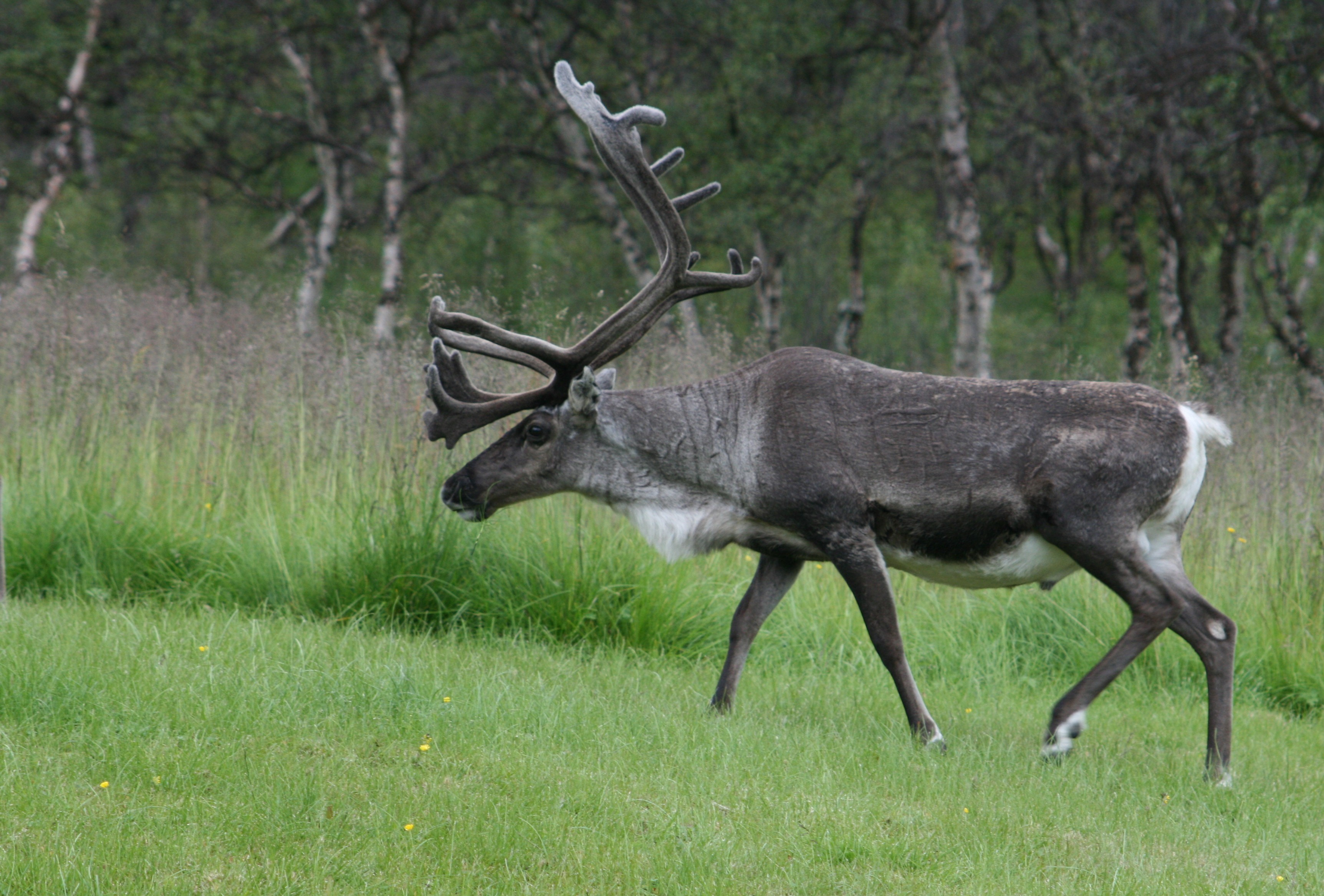
- A mountain reindeer (R. t. tarandus) from Sør-Varanger, in Norway

Conservation status
- Vulnerable (IUCN 3.1)

- Secure (NatureServe)

Scientific classification
- Kingdom: Animalia
- Phylum: Chordata
- Class: Mammalia
- Order: Artiodactyla
- Family: Cervidae
- Subfamily: Capreolinae
- Tribe: Odocoileini
- Genus: Rangifer; C. H. Smith, 1827
- Species: R. tarandus

Binomial name
- Rangifer tarandus (Linnaeus, 1758)

Species
- See text, traditionally 1, but possibly up to 6
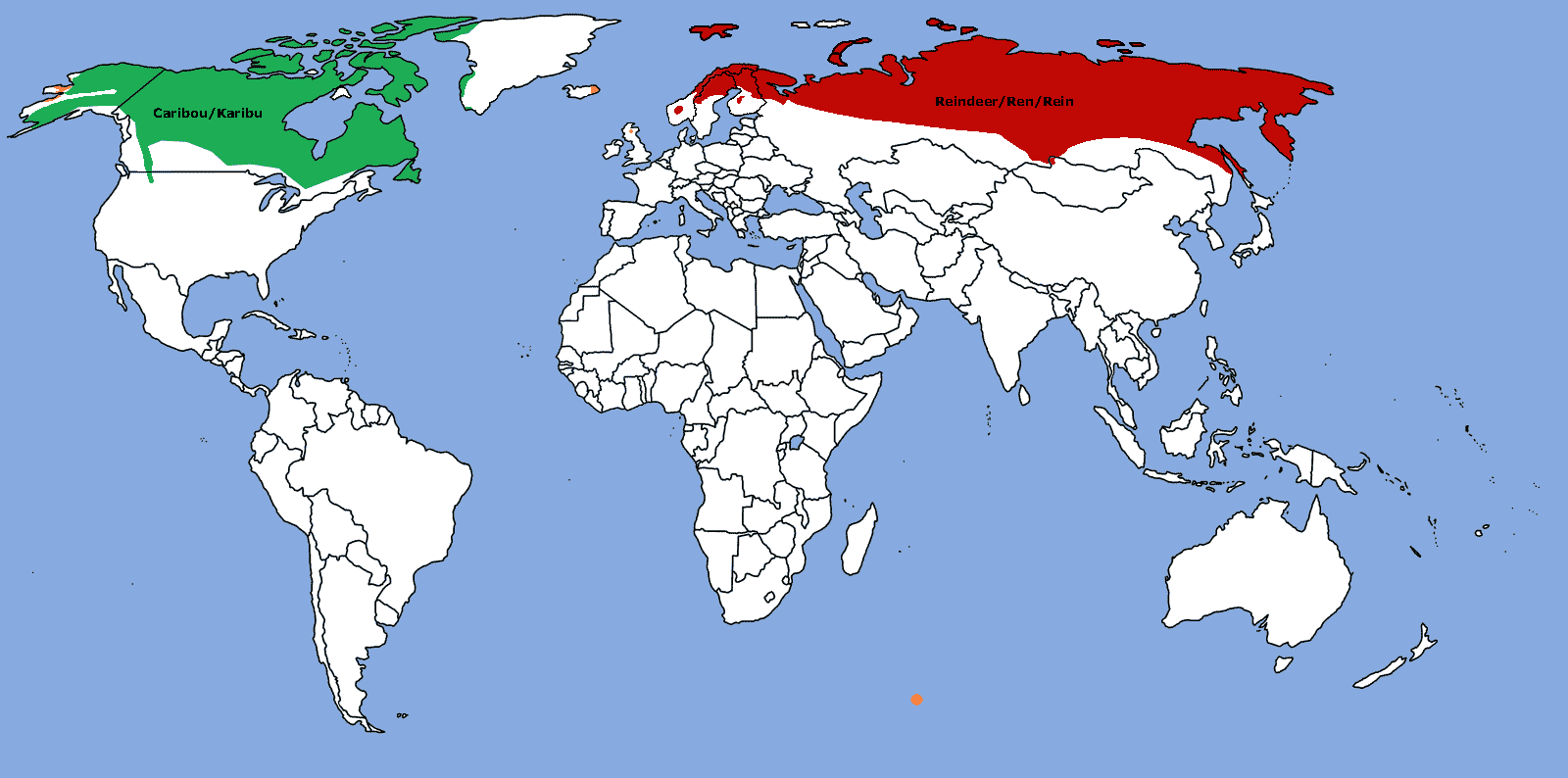
- Reindeer range: North American (green), Eurasian (red), and introduced (orange)

= Reindeer =

Reindeer (Caribou) Temporal range: Chibanian to present

Species of deer

The reindeer or caribou (Note: In North American English, known as caribou if wild and reindeer if domesticated) (Rangifer tarandus) is a species of deer with circumpolar distribution, native to the Arctic, subarctic, tundra, boreal, and mountainous regions of Northern Europe, Siberia, and North America. It is the only representative of the genus Rangifer. More recent studies suggest the splitting of reindeer and caribou (North American terminology). "All caribou and reindeer throughout the world are considered to be the same species, but there are seven subspecies."

Reindeer occur in both migratory and sedentary populations, and their herd sizes vary greatly in different regions. The tundra subspecies are adapted for extreme cold, and some are adapted for long-distance migration.

Reindeer vary greatly in size and color from the smallest, the Svalbard reindeer (R. (t.) platyrhynchus), to the largest, Osborn's caribou (R. t. osborni). Although reindeer are quite numerous, some species and subspecies are in decline and considered vulnerable. They are unique among deer (Cervidae) in that females may have antlers, although the prevalence of antlered females varies by subspecies.

Reindeer are the only successfully semi-domesticated deer on a large scale in the world. Both wild and domestic reindeer (R. t. forma domesticus) have been an important source of food, clothing, and shelter for Arctic people from prehistoric times. They are still herded and hunted today. In some traditional Christmas legends, Santa Claus's reindeer pull a sleigh through the night sky to help Santa Claus deliver gifts to good children on Christmas Eve.

== Description ==
Names follow international convention before the recent revision (see Reindeer § Taxonomy below). Reindeer / caribou (Rangifer) vary in size from the smallest, the Svalbard reindeer (R. (t.) platyrhynchus), to the largest, Osborn's caribou (R. t. osborni). They also vary in coat color and antler architecture.

The North American range of caribou extends from Alaska through the Yukon, the Northwest Territories and Nunavut throughout the tundra, taiga (boreal forest) and south through the Canadian Rocky Mountains. Of the eight subspecies classified by Harding (2022) into the Arctic caribou (R. arcticus), the migratory mainland barren-ground caribou of Arctic Alaska and Northern Canada (R. t. arcticus), summer in tundra and winter in taiga, a transitional forest zone between boreal forest and tundra; the nomadic Peary caribou (R. t. pearyi) lives in the polar desert of the high Arctic Archipelago and Grant's caribou (R. t. granti also called the Porcupine caribou) lives in the western end of the Alaska Peninsula and the adjacent islands; the other four subspecies, Osborn's caribou (R. t. osborni), Stone's caribou (R. t. stonei), the Rocky Mountain caribou (R. t. fortidens) and the Selkirk Mountains caribou (R. t. montanus) are all montane. An extinct island dwarf subspecies, Dawson's caribou (R. t. dawsoni), lived on Graham Island in Haida Gwaii (formerly known as the Queen Charlotte Islands).

The boreal woodland caribou (R. t. caribou), lives in the boreal forest of northeastern Canada: the Labrador caribou or Ungava caribou of Northern Quebec and northern Labrador (R. t. caboti), and the Newfoundland caribou of Newfoundland (R. t. terranovae) have been found to be genetically in the woodland caribou lineage.

In Eurasia, both wild and domestic reindeer (R. t. forma domesticus) are distributed across the tundra and into the taiga. Eurasian mountain reindeer (R. t. tarandus) are close to North American caribou genetically and visually, but with sufficient differences to warrant division into two species. The unique, insular Svalbard reindeer inhabits the Svalbard Archipelago. The Finnish forest reindeer (R. t. fennicus) is spottily distributed in the coniferous forest zones from Finland to the east of Lake Baikal: the Siberian forest reindeer (R. t. valentinae, formerly called the Busk Mountains reindeer (R. t. buskensis) by U.S. taxonomists) occupies both the Altai Mountains and the Ural Mountains.

Male ("bull") and female ("cow") reindeer can grow antlers annually, although the proportion of cows that grow antlers varies greatly between populations. Antlers are typically larger on bulls. Antler architecture varies by species and subspecies and, together with pelage differences, can often be used to distinguish between species and subspecies (see illustrations in Geist, 1991 and Geist, 1998).

== Status ==
About 20,000 mountain reindeer (R. t. tarandus) still live in the mountains of Norway, notably in Hardangervidda. In Sweden there are approximately 250,000 reindeer in herds managed by Sámi villages. Russia manages 19 herds of Siberian tundra reindeer (R. t. sibiricus) that total about 940,000. The Taimyr herd of Siberian tundra reindeer is the largest wild reindeer herd in the world, varying between 400,000 and 1,000,000; it is a metapopulation consisting of several subpopulations—some of which are phenotypically different—with different migration routes and calving areas. The Kamchatkan reindeer (R. t. phylarchus), a forest subspecies, formerly included reindeer west of the Sea of Okhotsk which, however, are indistinguishable genetically from the Jano-Indigirka, East Siberian taiga and Chukotka populations of R. t. sibiricus. Siberian tundra reindeer herds have been in decline but are stable or increasing since 2000.

Insular (island) reindeer, classified as the Novaya Zemlya reindeer (R. t. pearsoni) occupy several island groups: the Novaya Zemlya Archipelago (about 5,000 animals at last count, but most of these are either domestic reindeer or domestic-wild hybrids), the New Siberia Archipelago (about 10,000 to 15,000), and Wrangel Island (200 to 300 feral domestic reindeer).

The migratory George River herd of Labrador caribou (R. t. caboti) in Canada was once the second largest herd of reindeer in the world, with numbers varying between 800,000 and 900,000 in the 1990s. As of January 2018, there are fewer than 9,000 animals estimated to be left in the George River herd, as reported by the Canadian Broadcasting Corporation. The New York Times reported in April 2018 of the disappearance of the only herd of southern mountain woodland caribou in the contiguous United States, with an expert calling it "functionally extinct" after the herd's size dwindled to a mere three animals. After the last individual, a female, was translocated to a wildlife rehabilitation center in Canada, caribou were considered extirpated from the contiguous United States. The Committee on the Status of Endangered Wildlife in Canada (COSEWIC) classified both the Southern Mountain population DU9 (R. t. montanus) and the Central Mountain population DU8 (R. t. fortidens) as Endangered and the Northern Mountain population DU7 (R. t. osborni) as Threatened.

Some species and subspecies are rare and three subspecies have already become extinct: Dawson's caribou (R. t. dawsoni) from western Canada, the Sakhalin reindeer (R. t. setoni) from Sakhalin and the East Greenland caribou (R. t. eogroenlandicus) of northeastern Greenland, although some authorities believe that the latter is actually a junior synonym of the Peary caribou. Historically, the range of the sedentary boreal woodland caribou covered more than half of Canada and into the northern states of the contiguous United States from Maine to Washington. Boreal woodland caribou have disappeared from most of their original southern range and were designated as Threatened in 2002 by the Committee on the Status of Endangered Wildlife in Canada (COSEWIC). Environment and Climate Change Canada reported in 2011 that there were approximately 34,000 boreal woodland caribou in 51 ranges remaining in Canada (Environment Canada, 2011b), although those numbers included montane populations classified by Harding (2022) into subspecies of the Arctic caribou. Siberian tundra reindeer herds are also in decline, and Rangifer as a whole is considered to be Vulnerable by the International Union for Conservation of Nature (IUCN).

== Naming ==
Charles Hamilton Smith is credited with the name Rangifer for the reindeer genus, which Albertus Magnus used in his De animalibus, fol. Liber 22, Cap. 268: "Dicitur Rangyfer quasi ramifer". This word may go back to the Sámi word raingo. Carl Linnaeus chose the word tarandus as the specific epithet, making reference to Ulisse Aldrovandi's Quadrupedum omnium bisulcorum historia fol. 859–863, Cap. 30: De Tarando (1621). However, Aldrovandi and Conrad Gessner thought that rangifer and tarandus were two separate animals. In any case, the name tarandos goes back to Aristotle and Theophrastus.

The use of the terms reindeer and caribou for essentially the same animal can cause confusion, but the International Union for Conservation of Nature clearly delineates the issue: "Reindeer is the European name for the species of Rangifer, while in North America, Rangifer species are known as Caribou." According to the U.S. Food and Drug Administration, in North American English the animal is known as caribou if wild and reindeer if domesticated. The word reindeer is an anglicized version of the Old Norse words hreinn ("reindeer") and dýr ("animal") and has nothing to do with reins. The word caribou comes through French, from the Mi'kmaq qalipu, meaning "snow shoveler", and refers to its habit of pawing through the snow for food.

Because of its importance to many cultures, Rangifer and some of its species and subspecies have names in many languages. Inuvialuit of the western Canadian Arctic and Inuit of the eastern Canadian Arctic, who speak different dialects of the Inuit languages, both call the barren-ground caribou tuktu. The Wekʼèezhìi (Tłı̨chǫ) people, a Dene (Athapascan) group, call the Arctic caribou Ɂekwǫ̀ and the boreal woodland caribou tǫdzı. The Gwichʼin (also a Dene group) have over 24 distinct caribou-related words.

Reindeer are also called tuttu by the Greenlandic Inuit and hreindýr, sometimes rein, by the Icelanders.

== Evolution ==
The "glacial-interglacial cycles of the upper Pleistocene had a major influence on the evolution" of Rangifer species and other Arctic and subarctic species. Isolation of tundra-adapted species Rangifer in Last Glacial Maximum refugia during the last glacial – the Wisconsin glaciation in North America and the Weichselian glaciation in Eurasia – shaped "intraspecific genetic variability" particularly between the North American and Eurasian parts of the Arctic.

Reindeer / caribou (Rangifer) are in the subfamily Capreolinae, along with roe deer (Capreolus), Eurasian elk / moose (Alces), and water deer (Hydropotes). These antlered cervids split from the horned ruminants Bos (cattle), Ovis (sheep) and Capra (goats) about 36 million years ago. The Eurasian tribes of Capreolinae (Capreolini and Alceini) split from the New World tribe of it (Odocoileini) in the Late Miocene, 8.7–9.6 million years ago. Rangifer "evolved as a mountain deer, ...exploiting the subalpine and alpine meadows...". Rangifer originated in the Late Pliocene and diversified in the Early Pleistocene, a 2+ million-year period of multiple glacier advances and retreats. Several named Rangifer fossils in Eurasia and North America predate the evolution of modern tundra reindeer.

Archaeologists distinguish "modern" tundra reindeer and barren-ground caribou from primitive forms – living and extinct – that did not have adaptations to extreme cold and to long-distance migration. They include a broad, high muzzle to increase the volume of the nasal cavity to warm and moisten the air before it enters the throat and lungs, bez tines set close to the brow tines, distinctive coat patterns, short legs and other adaptations for running long distances, and multiple behaviors suited to tundra, but not to forest (such as synchronized calving and aggregation during rutting and post-calving). As well, many genes, including those for vitamin D metabolism, fat metabolism, retinal development, circadian rhythm, and tolerance to cold temperatures, are found in tundra caribou that are lacking or rudimentary in forest types. For this reason, forest-adapted reindeer and caribou could not survive in tundra or polar deserts. The oldest undoubted Rangifer fossil is from Omsk, Russia, dated to 2.1–1.8 million years before present (BP). The oldest North American Rangifer fossil is from the Yukon, 1.6 million years BP. A fossil skull fragment from Süßenborn, Germany, R. arcticus stadelmanni, (which is probably misnamed) with "rather thin and cylinder-shaped" antlers, dates to the Middle Pleistocene (Günz) Period, 680,000–620,000 BP. Rangifer fossils become increasingly frequent in circumpolar deposits beginning with the Riss glaciations, the second youngest of the Pleistocene Epoch, roughly 300,000–130,000 BP. By the 4-Würm period (110,000–70,000 to 12,000–10,000 BP), its European range was extensive, supplying a major food source for prehistoric Europeans. North American fossils outside of Beringia that predate the Last Glacial Maximum (LGM) are of Rancholabrean age (240,000–11,000 years BP) and occur along the fringes of the Rocky Mountain and Laurentide ice sheets as far south as northern Alabama, U.S.; and in Sangamonian deposits (~100,000 years BP) from western Canada.

A R. t. pearyi–sized caribou occupied Greenland before and after the LGM and persisted in a relict enclave in northeastern Greenland until it went extinct about 1900 (see discussion of R. t. eogroenlandicus above). Archaeological excavations showed that larger barren-ground-sized caribou appeared in western Greenland about 4,000 years ago.

Valerius Geist (1998) dated the Eurasian reindeer radiation dates to the large Riss glaciation (347,000 to 128,000 years ago), based on the Norwegian-Svalbard split 225,000 years ago. Finnish forest reindeer (R. t. fennicus) likely evolved from Cervus [Rangifer] guettardi Desmarest, 1822, a reindeer that adapted to forest habitats in Eastern Europe as forests expanded during an interglacial period before the LGM (the Würmian or Weichselian glaciation);. The fossil species guettardi was later replaced by R. constantini, which was adapted for grasslands, in a second immigration 19,000–20,000 years ago when the LGM turned its forest habitats into tundra, while R. t. fennicus survived in isolation in Southwestern Europe. R. constantini was then replaced by modern tundra / barren-ground caribou adapted to extreme cold, probably in Beringia, before dispersing west (R. t. tarandus in the Scandinavian mountains and R. t. sibiricus across Siberia) and east (R. t. arcticus in the North American Barrenlands) when rising seas isolated them. Likewise in North America, DNA analysis shows that woodland caribou (R. caribou) diverged from primitive ancestors of tundra / barren-ground caribou not during the LGM, 26,000–19,000 years ago, as previously assumed, but in the Middle Pleistocene around 357,000 years ago. At that time, modern tundra caribou had not even evolved. Woodland caribou are likely more related to extinct North American forest caribou than to barren-ground caribou. For example, the extinct caribou Torontoceros [Rangifer] hypogaeus, had features (robust and short pedicles, smooth antler surface, and high position of second tine) that relate it to forest caribou.

Humans started hunting reindeer in both the Mesolithic and Neolithic Periods, and humans are today the main predator in many areas. Norway and Greenland have unbroken traditions of hunting wild reindeer from the Last Glacial Period until the present day. In the non-forested mountains of central Norway, such as Jotunheimen, it is still possible to find remains of stone-built trapping pits, guiding fences and bow rests, built especially for hunting reindeer. These can, with some certainty, be dated to the Migration Period, although it is not unlikely that they have been in use since the Stone Age.

Cave paintings by ancient Europeans include both tundra and forest types of reindeer.

A 2022 study of ancient environmental DNA from the Early Pleistocene (2 million years ago) Kap Kobenhavn Formation of northern Greenland identified preserved DNA fragments of Rangifer, identified as basal but potentially ancestral to modern reindeer. This suggests that reindeer have inhabited Greenland since at least the Early Pleistocene. Around this time, northern Greenland was 11–19 °C (20–34 °F) warmer than the Holocene, with a boreal forest hosting a species assemblage with no modern analogue. These are among the oldest DNA fragments ever sequenced.

== Taxonomy ==
=== Naming and research on museum collections ===
Carl Linnaeus in 1758 named the Eurasian tundra species Cervus tarandus, the genus Rangifer being credited to Smith, 1827.

Rangifer has had a convoluted history because of the similarity in antler architecture (brow tines asymmetrical and often palmate, bez tines, a back tine sometimes branched, and branched at the distal end, often palmate). Because of individual variability, early taxonomists were unable to discern consistent patterns among populations, nor could they, examining collections in Europe, appreciate the difference in habitats and the differing function they imposed on antler architecture. Comparative morphometrics, the measurement of skulls, is often seen as more objective than description of differences of color or antler patterns, but actually confounds genetic variance with epistatic and statistical variance as well as compounded environment-based variance.

Modern tundra caribou bez tines are set low, just above the brow tine, which is vertically flattened to protect the eyes while the buck "threshes" low brush, a courtship display. The low bez tines help the wide flat brow tines dig craters in the hard-packed tundra snow for forage, for which reason brow tines are often called "shovels" in North America and "ice tines" in Europe. The differences in antler architecture reflect fundamental differences in ecology and behavior, and in turn deep divisions in ancestry that were not apparent to the early taxonomists.

Similarly, working with museum collections where skins were often faded and in poor states of preservation, early taxonomists could not readily perceive differences in coat patterns that were consistent within a subspecies, but variable among them. Geist calls these "nuptial" characteristics: sexually selected characters that are highly conserved and diagnostic among subspecies.

=== Biological exploration expeditions ===
Towards the end of the 19th century, national museums began sending out biological exploration expeditions and collections accumulated. Taxonomists, usually working for the museums, began naming subspecies more rigorously, based on statistical differences in detailed cranial, dental and skeletal measurements than antlers and pelage, supplemented by better knowledge of differences in ecology and behavior. From 1898 to 1937, mammalogists named 12 new species (other than barren-ground and woodland, which had been named earlier) of caribou in Canada and Alaska, and three new species and nine new subspecies in Eurasia, each properly described according to the evolving rules of zoological nomenclature, with type localities designated and type specimens deposited in museums (see table in Species and subspecies below).

=== Reclassification ===
In the mid-20th century, as definitions of "species" evolved, mammalogists in Europe and North America made all Rangifer species conspecific with R. tarandus, and synonymized most of the subspecies. Alexander William Francis Banfield's often-cited A Revision of the Reindeer and Caribou, Genus Rangifer (1961), eliminated R. t. caboti (the Labrador caribou), R. t. osborni (Osborn's caribou—from British Columbia) and R. t. terranovae (the Newfoundland caribou) as invalid and included only barren-ground caribou, renamed as R. t. groenlandicus (formerly R. arcticus) and woodland caribou as R. t. caribou. However, Banfield made multiple errors, eliciting a scathing review by Ian McTaggart-Cowan in 1962. Most authorities continued to consider all or most subspecies valid; some were quite distinct. In his chapter in the authoritative 2005 reference work Mammal Species of the World, referenced by the American Society of Mammalogists, English zoologist Peter Grubb agreed with Valerius Geist, a specialist on large mammals, that these subspecies were valid (i.e., before the recent revision): In North America, R. t. caboti, R. t. caribou, R. t. dawsoni, R. t. groenlandicus, R. t. osborni, R. t. pearyi, and R. t. terranovae; and in Eurasia, R. t. tarandus, R. t. buskensis (called R. t. valentinae in Europe; see Species and subspecies below), R. t. phylarchus, R. t. pearsoni, R. t. sibiricus and R. t. platyrhynchus. These subspecies were retained in the 2011 replacement work Handbook of the Mammals of the World Vol. 2: Hoofed Mammals. Most Russian authors also recognized R. t. angustirostris, a forest reindeer from the east of Lake Baikal.

However, since 1991, many genetic studies have revealed deep divergence between modern tundra reindeer and woodland caribou. Geist (2007) and others continued arguing that the woodland caribou was incorrectly classified, noting that "true woodland caribou, the uniformly dark, small-maned type with the frontally emphasized, flat-beamed antlers", is "scattered thinly along the southern rim of North American caribou distribution". He affirms that the "true woodland caribou is very rare, in very great difficulties and requires the most urgent of attention."

==== Ecotypes ====
In 2011, noting that the former classifications of Rangifer tarandus, either with prevailing taxonomy on subspecies, designations based on ecotypes, or natural population groupings, failed to capture "the variability of caribou across their range in Canada" needed for effective subspecies conservation and management, COSEWIC developed Designatable Unit (DU) attribution, an adaptation of "evolutionary significant units". The 12 designatable units for caribou in Canada (that is, excluding Alaska and Greenland) based on ecology, behavior and, importantly, genetics (but excluding morphology and archaeology) essentially followed the previously named subspecies distributions, without naming them as such, plus some ecotypes. Ecotypes are not phylogenetically based and cannot substitute for taxonomy.

==== Genetic, molecular and archaeological evidence ====
Meanwhile, genetic data continued to accumulate, revealing sufficiently deep divisions to easily separate Rangifer back into six previously named species and to resurrect several previously named subspecies. Molecular data showed that the Greenland caribou (R. t. groenlandicus) and the Svalbard reindeer (R. t. platyrhynchus), although not closely related to each other, were the most genetically divergent among Rangifer clades; that modern (see Evolution above). Eurasian tundra reindeer (R. t. tarandus and R. t. sibiricus) and North American barren-ground caribou (R. t. arcticus), although sharing ancestry, were separable at the subspecies level; that Finnish forest reindeer (R. t. fennicus) clustered well apart from both wild and domestic tundra reindeer and that boreal woodland caribou (R. t. caribou) were separable from all others. Meanwhile, archaeological evidence was accumulating that Eurasian forest reindeer descended from an extinct forest-adapted reindeer and not from tundra reindeer (see Evolution above); since they do not share a direct common ancestor, they cannot be conspecific. Similarly, woodland caribou diverged from the ancestors of Arctic caribou before modern barren-ground caribou had evolved, and were more likely related to extinct North American forest reindeer (see Evolution above). Lacking a direct shared ancestor, barren-ground and woodland caribou cannot be conspecific.

Molecular data also revealed that the four western Canadian montane ecotypes are not woodland caribou: they share a common ancestor with modern barren-ground caribou (tundra reindeer), but distantly, having diverged more than 60,000 years ago—before the modern ecotypes had evolved their cold- and darkness-adapted physiologies and mass-migration and aggregated behaviors (see Evolution above). Before Banfield (1961), taxonomists using cranial, dental and skeletal measurements had unequivocally allied these western montane ecotypes with barren-ground caribou, naming them (as in Osgood 1909 Murie, 1935 and Anderson 1946, among others) R. t. stonei, R. t. montanus, R. t. fortidens and R. t. osborni, respectively, and this phylogeny was confirmed by genetic analysis.

==== Novel genetics-based clades ====
DNA also revealed three unnamed clades that, based on genetic distance, genetic divergence and shared vs. private haplotypes and alleles, together with ecological and behavioral differences, may justify separation at the subspecies level: the Atlantic-Gaspésie caribou (COSEWIC DU11), an eastern montane ecotype of the boreal woodland caribou, and the Baffin Island caribou. Neither one of these clades has yet been formally described or named.

Jenkins et al. (2012) said that "[Baffin Island] caribou are unique compared to other Barrenground herds, as they do not overwinter in forested habitat, nor do all caribou undertake long seasonal migrations to calving areas." It also shares a mtDNA haplotype with Labrador caribou, in the North American lineage (i.e., woodland caribou). Røed et al. (1991) had noted:

Among Baffin Island caribou the TFL2 allele was the most common allele (p=0.521), while this allele was absent, or present in very low frequencies, in other caribou populations (Table 1), including the Canadian barren-ground caribou from the Beverly herd. A large genetic difference between Baffin Island caribou and the Beverly herd was also indicated by eight alleles found in the Beverly herd which were absent from the Baffin Island samples.

Jenkins et al. (2018) also reported genetic distinctiveness of Baffin Island caribou from all other barren-ground caribou; its genetic signature was not found on the mainland or on other islands; nor were Beverly herd (the nearest mainly barren-ground caribou) alleles present in Baffin Island caribou, evidence of reproductive isolation.

These advances in Rangifer genetics were brought together with previous morphological-based descriptions, ecology, behavior and archaeology to propose a new revision of the genus.

== Species and subspecies ==
Extant species and subspecies of Rangifer
Species		Subspecies	Common name	Sedentary / migratory	Range	Weight of male	Type locality / specimen
One-species taxonomy	Six-species taxonomy (Note: The six-species taxonomy is based on a revision by Harding (2022).)	Subspecies	Common name	Sedentary / migratory	Range	Weight of male	Type locality / specimen
R. tarandus (Linnaeus, 1758) reindeer or caribou	R. arcticus Richardson, 1829 barren-ground caribou	R. t. arcticus or R. a. articus (Richardson, 1829)	barren-ground caribou	migratory	the High Arctic islands of Nunavut and the Northwest Territories, Canada and western Greenland (except for the southwestern region)	150 kg (330 lb)	"Fort Enterprise, Winter Lake, Mackenzie District, N.W.T., Canada" given by Allen 1908; Neotype no. 22066 (for the species)
R. tarandus (Linnaeus, 1758) reindeer or caribou	R. arcticus Richardson, 1829 barren-ground caribou	R. t. arcticus or R. a. arcticus (Richardson, 1829)	Porcupine caribou (an ecotype of the barren-ground caribou)	migratory	summers in the northern Yukon mountains and the coastal plains; winters in the boreal forests of Alaska and the Yukon	150 kg (330 lb)	
R. tarandus (Linnaeus, 1758) reindeer or caribou	R. arcticus Richardson, 1829 barren-ground caribou	R. t. fortidens or R. a. fortidens (Hollister, 1912)	Rocky Mountain caribou	short migrations: summers in alpine forest and winters in lowland forest	the Canadian Rocky Mountains	"Largest of the caribou, exceeding in measurements the largest specimens of Rangifer osborni and Rangifer montanus."	"head of Moose Pass branch of the Smoky River, Alberta (north-east of Mount Robson)"; USNM No. 174505
R. tarandus (Linnaeus, 1758) reindeer or caribou	R. arcticus Richardson, 1829 barren-ground caribou	R. t. granti or R. a. granti (Allen, 1902)	Grant's caribou	sedentary (makes short movements to seasonal habitats)	the western end of the Alaska Peninsula and the adjacent islands		"Western end of Alaska Peninsula, opposite Popoff Island, Alaska"; AMNH no. 17593
R. tarandus (Linnaeus, 1758) reindeer or caribou	R. arcticus Richardson, 1829 barren-ground caribou	R. t. montanus or R. a. montanus (Seton-Thompson, 1899)	Selkirk Mountains caribou	twice-yearly altitudinal movements	the Columbia Mountains (specifically the Selkirk, Purcell and Monashee Mountains) in British Columbia, Canada and Washington, Idaho and Montana, United States	no data	"Illecillewaet watershed, near Revelstoke, Selkirk Range, B. C."; NMC no. 232
R. tarandus (Linnaeus, 1758) reindeer or caribou	R. arcticus Richardson, 1829 barren-ground caribou	R. t. osborni or R. a. osborni (Note: <text missing>) (Allen, 1902) (Note: Banfield rejected this classification in 1961. However, Geist and others considered it valid. Bangs (1896) is invalid as a taxonomic authority, as his two-page pamphlet was never published.)	Osborn's caribou	short migrations: summers in alpine forest and winters in lowland muskeg	British Columbia, Canada	males up to 340 kg (750 lb)	"Cassiar Mountains, British Columbia; AMNH no. 15714
R. tarandus (Linnaeus, 1758) reindeer or caribou	R. arcticus Richardson, 1829 barren-ground caribou	R. t. pearyi or R. a. pearyi (Allen, 1902)	Peary caribou	an island population that makes local movements both within and among islands	the High Arctic islands (except for Baffin Island) of Nunavut and the Northwest Territories, Canada	smallest North American subspecies: males average 70 kg (150 lb)	"Ellesmere Land [Ellesmere Island], N. Lat. 79⁰"; AMNH no. 19231
R. tarandus (Linnaeus, 1758) reindeer or caribou	R. arcticus Richardson, 1829 barren-ground caribou	R. t. stonei or R. a. stonei (Allen, 1901)	Stone's caribou	altitudinal movements	the mountains of southern Alaska and the southeastern Yukon	no data	"Kenai Peninsula, Alaska"; AMNH no. 16701
R. tarandus (Linnaeus, 1758) reindeer or caribou	R. caribou (Gmelin, 1788) woodland caribou	R. t.. caribou or R. c. caribou (Gmelin, 1788)	boreal woodland caribou, eastern woodland caribou, boreal forest caribou or forest-dwelling caribou	sedentary (makes short movements to seasonal habitats)	the boreal forests of northeastern Canada	males average 180 kg (400 lb), up to 272 kg (600 lb)	Type locality amended to "eastern Canada" (Miller Jr. 1912); NMC Neotype no. 4800
R. tarandus (Linnaeus, 1758) reindeer or caribou	R. caribou (Gmelin, 1788) woodland caribou	R. t. caboti or R. c. caboti (G. M. Allen, 1914)	Labrador caribou or Ungava caribou	migratory (except for the Torngat Mountain population DU10)	Northern Quebec and northern Labrador, Canada	no data	"thirty miles [48 km] north of Nachvak [Torngat Mountains], northeast coast of Labrador", MCZ No. 15,372
R. tarandus (Linnaeus, 1758) reindeer or caribou	R. caribou (Gmelin, 1788) woodland caribou	R. t. terranovae or R. c. terranovae (Allen, 1896)	Newfoundland caribou		Newfoundland, Canada	139.6 kg (3 adult males)	"Grand Lake, Newfoundland"; AMNH 11775
R. tarandus (Linnaeus, 1758) reindeer or caribou	R. fennicus Lönnberg, 1909 forest reindeer	R. t. fennicus or R. f. fennicus (Lönnberg, 1909)	Finnish forest reindeer, European forest reindeer, wild forest reindeer or narrow-nosed reindeer	migratory	Finland and northwestern Russia	150–250 kg (330–550 lb)	"Torne District [in Enontekiö], Finnish Lappland"; NR No. 4661, Stockholm
R. tarandus (Linnaeus, 1758) reindeer or caribou	R. fennicus Lönnberg, 1909 forest reindeer	R. t. valentinae or R. f. valentinae (Flerov, 1933)	Siberian forest reindeer	altitudinal migration	the Ural Mountains, Russia and the Altai Mountains, Mongolia	no data	"Head of Chulyshman River, North-Eastern Altai, Siberia"; skin ZMASL no. 22599, skull no. 10214
R. tarandus (Linnaeus, 1758) reindeer or caribou	R. groenlandicus (Borowsky, 1780) (West) Greenland caribou	R. groenlandicus or R. t. groenlandicus (Borowsky, 1780) (Note: Although most taxonomic authorities over the years recognized "Greenland Caribou" as a distinct subspecies, several gave the name as a subspecies of Cervus [Rangifer] tarandus for North American barren-ground caribou, groenlandicus having priority over other names. The name dates from George Edwards (1743), who claimed to have seen a male specimen ("head of perfect horns...") from Greenland and said that a Captain Craycott had brought a live pair from Greenland to England in 1738.)	(West) Greenland caribou	sedentary	four small areas in southwestern Greenland	no data	"Greenland"
R. tarandus (Linnaeus, 1758) reindeer or caribou	R. platyrhynchus (Vrolik, 1829); Svalbard reindeer	R. platyrhynchus or R. t. platyrhynchus (Vrolik, 1829)	Svalbard reindeer	an island population that makes local movements both within and among islands	the Svalbard Archipelago of Norway	smallest of the reindeer; has extremely short legs	"Spitzbergen"; Neotype no. M2625, Oslo
R. tarandus (Linnaeus, 1758) reindeer or caribou	R. tarandus (Linnaeus, 1758) tundra reindeer or mountain reindeer	R. t. pearsoni (Lydekker, 1903)	Novaya Zemlya reindeer	an island population that makes local movements both within and among islands	the Novaya Zemlya and New Siberia Archipelagoes of Russia and Wrangel Island, Russia	no data	"Island of Novaya Zemlya"; type specimen "In the possession of H. J. Pearson, Esq., Bramcote, Nottinghamshire, England" (Flerov, 1933).
R. tarandus (Linnaeus, 1758) reindeer or caribou	R. tarandus (Linnaeus, 1758) tundra reindeer or mountain reindeer	R. t. phylarchus (Hollister, 1912)	Kamchatkan reindeer		restricted to the Kamchatka Peninsula, Russia, after those reindeer west of the Sea of Okhotsk were found to actually be R. t. sibiricus	no data	"Southeastern Kamchatka [Kamchatka]"; USNM No. 21343
R. tarandus (Linnaeus, 1758) reindeer or caribou	R. tarandus (Linnaeus, 1758) tundra reindeer or mountain reindeer	R. t. sibiricus (Murray, 1866)	Siberian tundra reindeer	long-distance migrations	Siberia, Russia, Franz Josef Land during the Holocene from >6400–1300 cal. BP (from where it has been extirpated)	no data	"Siberia. ...eastward of the River Lena"; Type specimen of sibiricus unknown; however, Jacobi (1931) deposited a type specimen of "asiaticus" in the Museum of Leningrad (ZMASL), Buturlin coll. no. 240-1908
R. tarandus (Linnaeus, 1758) reindeer or caribou	R. tarandus (Linnaeus, 1758) tundra reindeer or mountain reindeer	R. t. tarandus (Linnaeus, 1758)	mountain reindeer, Norwegian reindeer, northern reindeer, common reindeer or mountain caribou	migratory	the Arctic tundra of the Fennoscandian Peninsula in Norway and the Austfirðir in Iceland (where it has been introduced)	no data	Scandinavia

Abbreviations:

- AMNH: American Museum of Natural History
- BCPM: British Columbia Provincial Museum (= RBCM the Royal British Columbia Museum)
- NHMUK: British Museum (Natural History) (originally the BMNH)
- DMNH: Denver Museum of Natural History
- MCZ: Museum of Comparative Zoology
- MSI: Museum of the Smithsonian Institution
- NMC: National Museum of Canada (originally the CGS Canadian Geological Survey Museum, now the CMN Canadian Museum of Nature)
- NR: Naturhistoriska Riksmuseet
- RSMNH: Royal Swedish Museum of Natural History
- USNM,: United States National Museum
- ZMASL: Zoological Museum of the Zoological Institute of the Russian Academy of Sciences (formerly the Zoological Museum of the Academy of Sciences), Leningrad

Extinct subspecies of Rangifer
Subspecies	Common name	Division	Range	Weight of male	Extinct since
R. t. eogroenlandicus (Degerbøl, 1957)	†East Greenland caribou or Arctic reindeer (Note: The validity of this subspecies has been disputed, with some authorities considering it to be a junior synonym of the Peary caribou.)	tundra	northeastern Greenland	no data	1900
R. t. dawsoni or R. a. dawsoni (Thompson-Seton, 1900)	†Dawson's caribou or Queen Charlotte Islands caribou	woodland	Graham Island of Haida Gwaii off the coast of British Columbia, Canada (formerly known as the Queen Charlotte Islands)	no data	1908
R. t. setoni or R. f. setoni Flerov, 1933	†Sakhalin reindeer	tundra	Sakhalin in the Sea of Okhotsk, Russia	no data	2007?

The table above includes, as per the recent revision, R. t. caboti (the Labrador caribou (the Eastern Migratory population DU4)), and R. t. terranovae (the Newfoundland caribou (the Newfoundland population DU5)), which molecular analyses have shown to be of North American (i.e., woodland caribou) lineage; and four mountain ecotypes now known to be of distant Beringia-Eurasia lineage (see Taxonomy above).

The scientific name Tarandus rangifer buskensis Millais, 1915 (the Busk Mountains reindeer) was selected as the senior synonym to R. t. valentinae Flerov, 1933, in Mammal Species of the World but Russian authors do not recognize Millais and Millais' articles in a hunting travelogue, The Gun at Home and Abroad, because they seem to be short of being a taxonomic authority.

Type specimen for Greenland reindeer described by George Edwards, 1743

The scientific name groenlandicus is filled with problems. Edwards (1743) illustrated and claimed to have seen a male specimen ("head of perfect horns...") from Greenland and said that a Captain Craycott had brought a live pair from Greenland to England in 1738. He named it Capra groenlandicus, Greenland reindeer. Linnaeus, in the 12th edition of Systema naturae, gave grœnlandicus as a synonym for Cervus tarandus. Borowski disagreed (and again changed the spelling), saying Cervus grönlandicus was morphologically distinct from Eurasian tundra reindeer. Baird placed it under the genus Rangifer as R. grœnlandicus. It went back and forth as a full species or subspecies of the barren-ground caribou (R. arcticus) or a subspecies of the tundra reindeer (R. tarandus), but always as the Greenland reindeer / caribou. Taxonomists consistently documented morphological differences between Greenland and other caribou / reindeer in cranial measurements, dentition, antler architecture, etc. Then Banfield (1961) in his famously flawed revision, gave the name groenlandicus to all the barren-ground caribou in North America, Greenland included, because groenlandicus pre-dates Richardson's R. arctus. However, because genetic data shows the Greenland caribou to be the most distantly related of any caribou to all the others (genetic distance, FST = 44%, whereas most cervid species have a genetic distance of 2% to 5%) — as well as behavioral and morphological differences—a recent revision returned it to species status as R. groenlandicus. Although it has been assumed that the larger caribou that appeared in Greenland 4,000 years ago originated from Baffin Island (itself unique; see Taxonomy above), a reconstruction of LGM glacial retreat and caribou advance (Yannic et al. 2013) shows colonization by NAL lineage caribou more likely. Their PCA and tree diagrams show Greenland caribou clustering outside of the Beringian-Eurasian lineage.

The scientific name R. t. granti has a very interesting history. Allen (1902) named it as a distinct species, R. granti, from the "western end of Alaska Peninsula, opposite Popoff Island" and noting that:

Rangifer granti is a representative of the Barren Ground group of Caribou, which includes R. arcticus of the Arctic Coast and R. granlandicus of Greenland. It is not closely related to R. stonei of the Kenai Peninsula, from which it differs not only in its very much smaller size, but in important cranial characters and in coloration. ...The external and cranial differences between R. granti and the various forms of the Woodland Caribou are so great in almost every respect that no detailed comparison is necessary. ...According to Mr. Stone, Rangifer granti inhabits the " barren land of Alaska Peninsula, ranging well up into the mountains in summer, but descending to the lower levels in winter, generally feeding on the low flat lands near the coast and in the foothills...As regards cranial characters no comparison is necessary with R. montanus or with any of the woodland forms."

Osgood and Murie (1935), agreeing with granti's close relationship with the barren-ground caribou, brought it under R. arcticus as a subspecies, R. t. granti. Anderson (1946) and Banfield (1961), based on statistical analysis of cranial, dental and other characters, agreed. But Banfield (1961) also synonymized Alaska's large R. stonei with other mountain caribou of British Columbia and the Yukon as invalid subspecies of woodland caribou, then R. t. caribou. This left the small, migratory barren-ground caribou of Alaska and the Yukon, including the Porcupine caribou ecotype, without a name, which Banfield rectified in his 1974 Mammals of Canada by extending to them the name "granti". Valerius Geist (1998), in the only error in his whole illustrious career, re-analyzed Banfield's data with additional specimens found in an unpublished report he cites as "Skal, 1982", but was "not able to find diagnostic features that could segregate this form from the western barren ground type." But Skal 1982 had included specimens from the eastern end of the Alaska Peninsula and the Kenai Peninsula, the range of the larger Stone's caribou. Later, geneticists comparing barren-ground caribou of Alaska with those of mainland Canada found little difference and they all became the former R. t. groenlandicus (now R. t. arcticus). R. t. granti was lost in the oblivion of invalid taxonomy until Alaskan researchers sampled some small, pale caribou from the western end of the Alaska Peninsula, their range enclosing the type locality designated by Allen (1902) and found them to be genetically distinct from all other caribou in Alaska. Thus, granti was rediscovered, its range restricted to that originally described.

Stone's caribou (R. t. stonei), a large montane type, was described from the Kenai Peninsula (where, apparently, it was never common except in years of great abundance), the eastern end of the Alaska Peninsula, and mountains throughout southern and eastern Alaska. It was placed under R. arcticus as a subspecies, R. t. stonei, and later synonymised as noted above. The same genetic analyses mentioned above for R. t. granti resulted in resurrecting R. t. stonei as well.

The Sakhalin reindeer (R. t. setoni), endemic to Sakhalin, was described as Rangifer tarandus setoni Flerov, 1933, but Banfield (1961) brought it under R. t. fennicus as a junior synonym. The wild reindeer on the island are apparently extinct, having been replaced by domestic reindeer (R. t. forma domesticus).

Some of the Rangifer species and subspecies may be further divided by ecotype depending on several behavioral factors – predominant habitat use (northern, tundra, mountain, forest, boreal forest, forest-dwelling, woodland, woodland (boreal), woodland (migratory) or woodland (mountain), spacing (dispersed or aggregated) and migration patterns (sedentary or migratory). North American examples of this are the Torngat Mountain population DU10, an ecotype of R. t. caboti; a recently discovered and unnamed clade between the Mackenzie River and Great Bear Lake of Beringian-Eurasian lineage, an ecotype of R. t. osborni; the Atlantic-Gaspésie population DU11, an eastern montane ecotype of the boreal woodland caribou (R. t. caribou); the Baffin Island caribou, an ecotype of the barren-ground caribou (R. t. arcticus); and the Dolphin-Union "herd", another ecotype of R. t. arcticus. The last three of these likely qualify as subspecies, but they have not yet been formally described or named.

== Physical characteristics ==
Naming in this and following sections follows the taxonomy in the authoritative 2011 reference work Handbook of the Mammals of the World Vol. 2: Hoofed Mammals.

=== Antlers ===
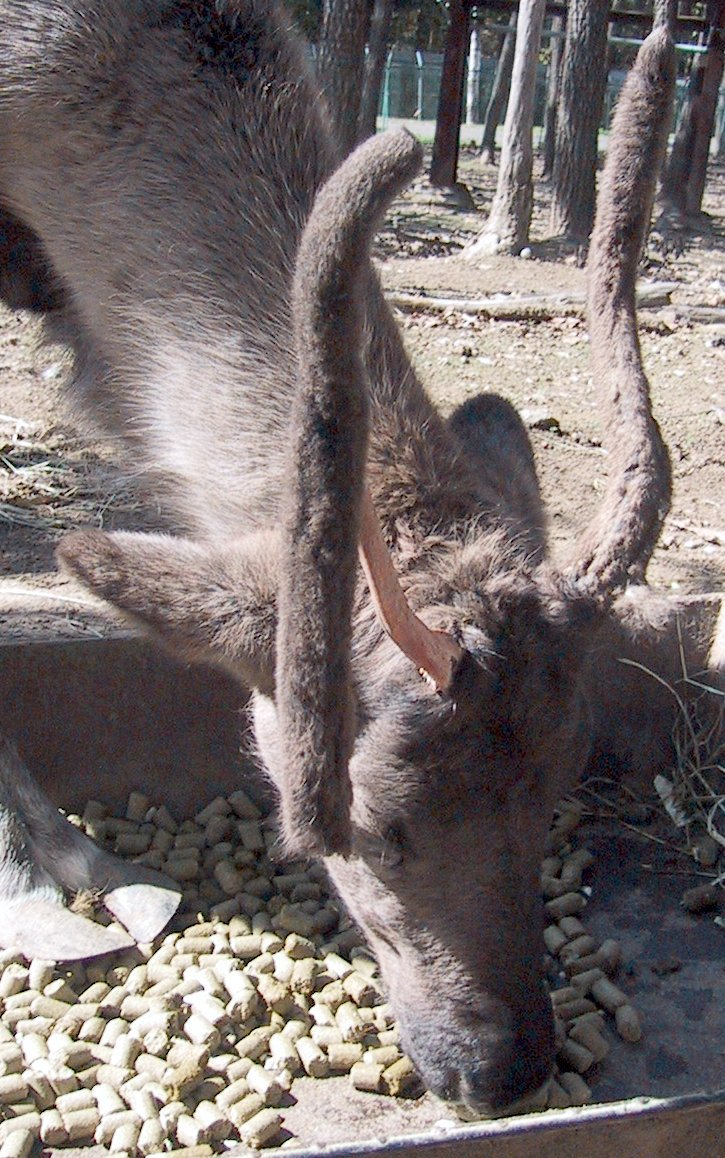
Losing the velvet layer under which a new antler is growing, an annual process

In most cervid species, only males grow antlers; the reindeer is the only cervid species in which females also grow them normally. Androgens play an essential role in the antler formation of cervids. The antlerogenic genes in reindeer have more sensitivity to androgens in comparison with other cervids.

There is considerable variation among species and subspecies in the size of the antlers (e.g., they are rather small and spindly in the northernmost species and subspecies), but on average a bull's antlers are the second largest of any extant deer species, after those of the male moose. In the largest subspecies, the antlers of large bulls can range up to 100 cm (39 in) in width and 135 cm (53 in) in beam length. They have the largest antlers relative to body size among extant deer species. Antler size measured in number of points reflects the nutritional status of the individual reindeer and the climate variation of its environment. The number of points on bulls' antlers increases from birth to 5 years of age and remains relatively constant from then on. "In male caribou, antler mass (but not the number of tines) varies in concert with body mass." While the antlers of boreal woodland caribou bulls are typically smaller than those of barren-ground caribou bulls, they can be over 1 m (3 ft 3 in) across. They are flattened in cross-section, compact and relatively dense. Geist describes them as frontally emphasized, flat-beamed antlers. Boreal woodland caribou bulls' antlers are thicker and broader than barren-ground caribou bulls' antlers and their legs and heads are longer. Quebec-Labrador caribou bulls' antlers can be significantly larger and wider than other types of woodland caribou. Central barren-ground caribou bulls' antlers are perhaps the most diverse in configuration and can grow to be very high and wide. Osborn's caribou bulls' antlers are typically the most massive, with the largest circumference measurements.

The antlers' main beams begin at the brow "extending posterior over the shoulders and bowing so that the tips point forward. The prominent, palmate brow tines extend forward, over the face." The antlers typically have two separate groups of points, lower and upper.

Antlers tend to grow on bulls in March or April and on cows in May or June. This process is called antlerogenesis. Antlers grow very quickly every year on the bulls. As the antlers grow, they are covered in thick velvet, filled with blood vessels and spongy in texture. The antler velvet of the barren-ground caribou and the boreal woodland caribou is dark chocolate brown. The velvet that covers growing antlers is a highly vascularised skin. This velvet is dark brown on woodland or barren-ground caribou and slate-grey on Peary caribou and the Dolphin-Union caribou "herd". Velvet lumps in March can develop into a rack measuring more than a 1 m (3 ft 3 in) in length by August.

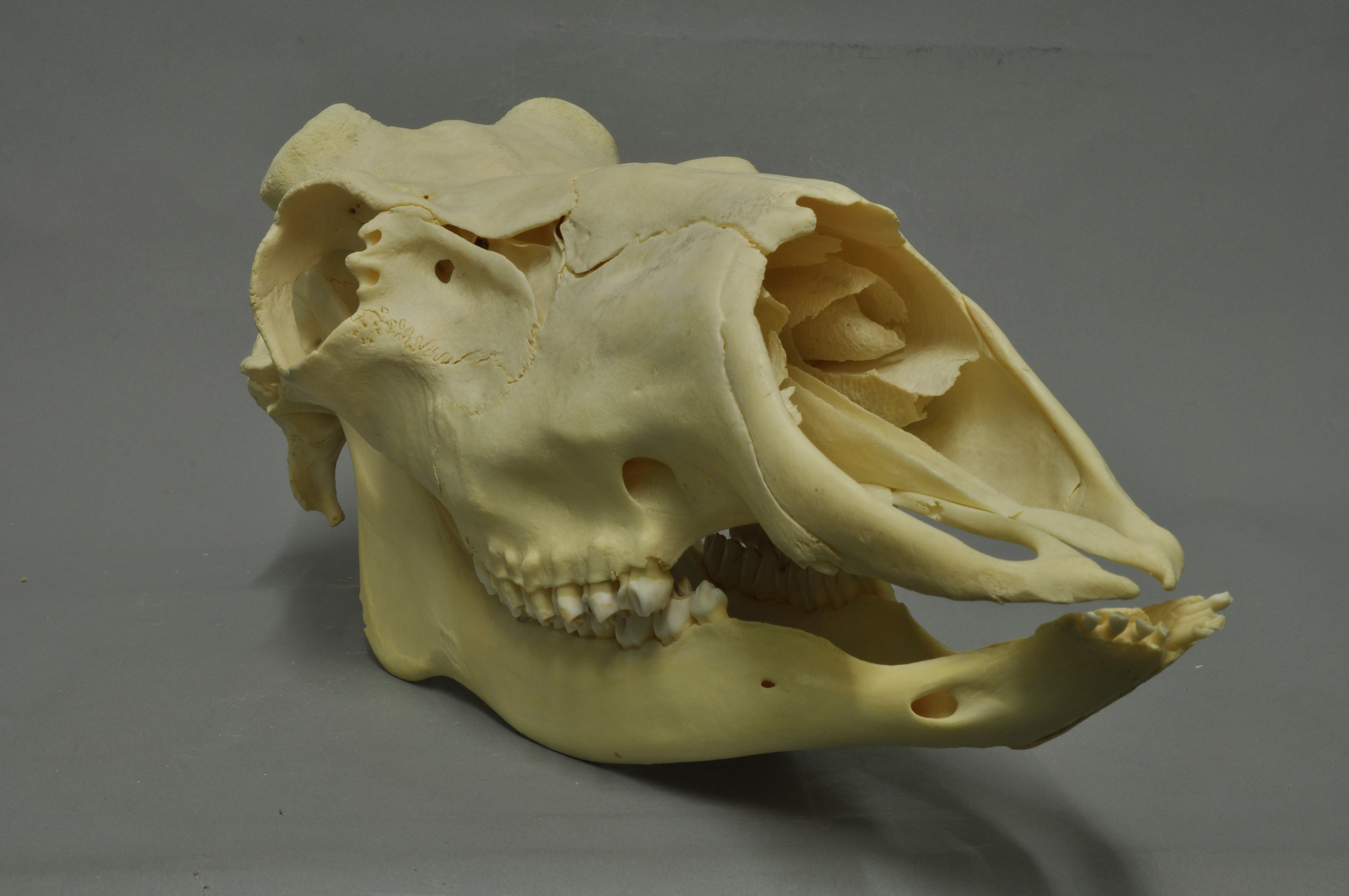
A R. tarandus skull

When the antler growth is fully grown and hardened, the velvet is shed or rubbed off. To the Inuit, for whom the caribou is a "culturally important keystone species", the months are named after landmarks in the caribou life cycle. For example, amiraijaut in the Igloolik region is "when velvet falls off caribou antlers."

Bulls use their antlers to compete with other bulls during the mating season. Butler (1986) showed that the social requirements of cows during the rut determines the mating strategies of bulls and, consequently, the form of bulls' antlers. In describing woodland caribou, which have a harem-defense mating system, SARA wrote, "During the rut, males engage in frequent and furious sparring battles with their antlers. Large males with large antlers do most of the mating." Reindeer continue to migrate until the bulls have used up their back fat. By contrast, barren-ground caribou bulls tend individual cows and their fights are brief and much less intense; consequently, their antlers are long, and thin, round in cross-section and less branched and are designed more for either show or sexual attraction than for fighting.

In late autumn or early winter after the rut, bulls lose their antlers, growing a new pair the next summer with a larger rack than the previous year. Cows keep their antlers until they calve. In both the Scandinavian and the Arctic Circle reindeer populations, old bulls' antlers fall off in late December, young bulls' antlers fall off in the early spring, and cows' antlers fall off in the summer.

When bulls lose their antlers in early to mid-winter, the antlered cows acquire the highest ranks in the feeding hierarchy, gaining access to the best foraging areas. These cows are healthier than those without antlers. Calves whose mothers do not have antlers are more prone to disease and have a significantly higher mortality rate. Cows in good nutritional condition, for example, during a mild winter with good winter range quality, may grow new antlers earlier, as antler growth requires high intake.

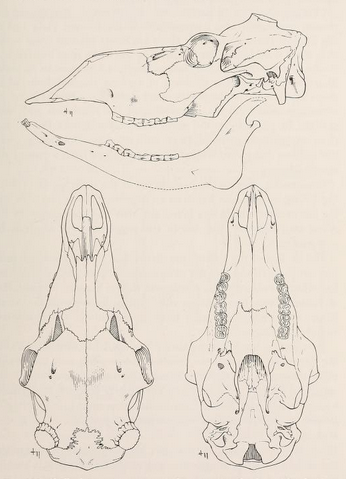
A R. t. platyrhynchus skull

According to a respected Igloolik elder, Noah Piugaattuk, who was one of the last outpost camp leaders, caribou (tuktu) antlers

...get detached every year...Young males lose the velvet from the antlers much more quickly than female caribou even though they are not fully mature. They start to work with their antlers just as soon as the velvet starts to fall off. The young males engage in fights with their antlers towards autumn...soon after the velvet had fallen off they will be red, as they start to get bleached their colour changes...When the velvet starts to fall off the antler is red because the antler is made from blood. The antler is the blood that has hardened; in fact, the core of the antler is still bloody when the velvet starts to fall off, at least close to the base.

— Elder Noah Piugaattuk of Igloolik, cited in "Tuktu—Caribou" (2002) "Canada's Polar Life"

According to the Igloolik Oral History Project (IOHP), "Caribou antlers provided the Inuit with a myriad of implements, from snow knives and shovels to drying racks and seal-hunting tools. A complex set of terms describes each part of the antler and relates it to its various uses". Currently, the larger racks of antlers are used by Inuit in Inuit art as materials for carving. Iqaluit-based Jackoposie Oopakak's 1989 carving, entitled Nunali, which means "place where people live", and which is part of the permanent collection of the National Gallery of Canada, includes a massive set of caribou antlers on which he has intricately carved the miniaturized world of the Inuit where "Arctic birds, caribou, polar bears, seals, and whales are interspersed with human activities of fishing, hunting, cleaning skins, stretching boots, and travelling by dog sled and kayak...from the base of the antlers to the tip of each branch".

=== Pelt ===
The color of reindeer fur varies considerably, both between individuals and depending on season, species and subspecies. Northern populations, which usually are relatively small, are whiter, while southern populations, which usually are typically large, are darker. This can be seen well in North America, where the northernmost subspecies, the Peary caribou, is the whitest and smallest subspecies of the continent, while the Selkirk Mountains caribou (Southern Mountain population DU9) is the darkest and nearly the largest, only exceeded in size by Osborn's caribou (Northern Mountain population DU7).

The coat has two layers of fur: a dense woolly undercoat and a longer-haired overcoat consisting of hollow, air-filled hairs. (Note: According to Inuit elder Marie Kilunik of the Aivilingmiut, Canadian Inuit preferred the caribou skins from caribou taken in the late summer or autumn, when their coats had thickened. They used it for winter clothing "because each hair is hollow and fills with air trapping heat.") Fur is the primary insulation factor that allows reindeer to regulate their core body temperature in relation to their environment, the thermogradient, even if the temperature rises to 38 °C (100 °F). In 1913, Dugmore noted how the woodland caribou swim so high out of the water, unlike any other mammal, because their hollow, "air-filled, quill-like hair" acts as a supporting "life jacket".

A darker belly color may be caused by two mutations of MC1R. They appear to be more common in herds of domestic reindeer (R. t. forma domesticus).

=== Heat exchange ===
Blood moving into the legs is cooled by blood returning to the body in a countercurrent heat exchange (CCHE), a highly efficient means of minimizing heat loss through the skin's surface. In the CCHE mechanism, in cold weather, blood vessels are closely knotted and intertwined with arteries to the skin and appendages that carry warm blood with veins returning to the body that carry cold blood causing the warm arterial blood to exchange heat with the cold venous blood. In this way, their legs for example are kept cool, maintaining the core body temperature nearly 30 °C (54 °F) higher with less heat lost to the environment. Heat is thus recycled instead of being dissipated. The "heart does not have to pump blood as rapidly in order to maintain a constant body core temperature and thus, metabolic rate." CCHE is present in animals such as reindeer, fox and moose that live in extreme conditions of cold or hot weather as a mechanism for retaining the heat in (or out of) the body. These are countercurrent exchange systems with the same fluid, usually blood, in a circuit, used for both directions of flow.

Reindeer have specialized counter-current vascular heat exchange in their nasal passages. Temperature gradient along the nasal mucosa is under physiological control. Incoming cold air is warmed by body heat before entering the lungs and water is condensed from the expired air and captured before the reindeer's breath is exhaled, then used to moisten dry incoming air and possibly be absorbed into the blood through the mucous membranes. Like moose, caribou have specialized noses featuring nasal turbinate bones that dramatically increase the surface area within the nostrils.

=== Eyes ===
A study by researchers from University College London in 2011 revealed that reindeer can see light with wavelengths as short as 320 nm (i.e., in the ultraviolet range), considerably below the human threshold of 400 nm. It is thought that this ability helps them to survive in the Arctic, because many objects that blend into the landscape in light visible to humans, such as urine and fur, produce sharp contrasts in ultraviolet. It has been proposed that ultraviolet flashes on power lines are responsible for reindeer avoiding power lines because "...in darkness these animals see power lines not as dim, passive structures but, rather, as lines of flickering light stretching across the terrain."

In 2023, researchers studying reindeer living in Cairngorms National Park, Scotland, suggested that UV visual sensitivity in reindeer helps them detect UV-absorbing lichens against a background of UV-reflecting snows.

The tapetum lucidum of Arctic reindeer eyes changes in color from gold in summer to blue in winter to improve their vision during times of continuous darkness, and perhaps enable them to better spot predators.

=== Hooves ===
The reindeer has large feet with crescent-shaped cloven hooves for walking in snow or swamps. According to the Species at Risk Public Registry (SARA), woodland

Caribou have large feet with four toes. In addition to two small ones, called "dew claws," they have two large, crescent-shaped toes that support most of their weight and serve as shovels when digging for food under snow. These large concave hooves offer stable support on wet, soggy ground and on crusty snow. The pads of the hoof change from a thick, fleshy shape in the summer to become hard and thin in the winter months, reducing the animal's exposure to the cold ground. Additional winter protection comes from the long hair between the "toes"; it covers the pads so the caribou walks only on the horny rim of the hooves.

— SARA 2014

Reindeer hooves adapt to the season: in the summer, when the tundra is soft and wet, the footpads become sponge-like and provide extra traction. In the winter, the pads shrink and tighten, exposing the rim of the hoof, which cuts into the ice and crusted snow to keep it from slipping. This also enables them to dig down (an activity known as "cratering") through the snow to their favourite food, a lichen known as reindeer lichen (Cladonia rangiferina).

=== Size ===
The females (or "cows" as they are often called) usually measure 162–205 cm (64–81 in) in length and weigh 80–120 kg (180–260 lb). The males (or "bulls" as they are often called) are typically larger (to an extent which varies between the different species and subspecies), measuring 180–214 cm (71–84 in) in length and usually weighing 159–182 kg (351–401 lb). Exceptionally large bulls have weighed as much as 318 kg (701 lb). Weight varies drastically between the seasons, with bulls losing as much as 40% of their pre-rut weight.

The shoulder height is usually 85 to 150 cm (33 to 59 in), and the tail is 14 to 20 cm (5.5 to 7.9 in) long.

The Svalbard reindeer is the smallest of them all. It is also relatively short-legged and may have a shoulder height of as little as 80 cm (31 in), thereby following Allen's rule.

=== Clicking sound ===
The knees of many species and subspecies of reindeer are adapted to produce a clicking sound as they walk. The sounds originate in the tendons of the knees and may be audible from several hundred meters away. The frequency of the knee-clicks is one of a range of signals that establish relative positions on a dominance scale among reindeer. "Specifically, loud knee-clicking is discovered to be an honest signal of body size, providing an exceptional example of the potential for non-vocal acoustic communication in mammals." The clicking sound made by reindeer as they walk is caused by small tendons slipping over bone protuberances (sesamoid bones) in their feet. The sound is made when a reindeer is walking or running, occurring when the full weight of the foot is on the ground or just after it is relieved of the weight.

== Biology and behaviors ==
=== Seasonal body composition ===
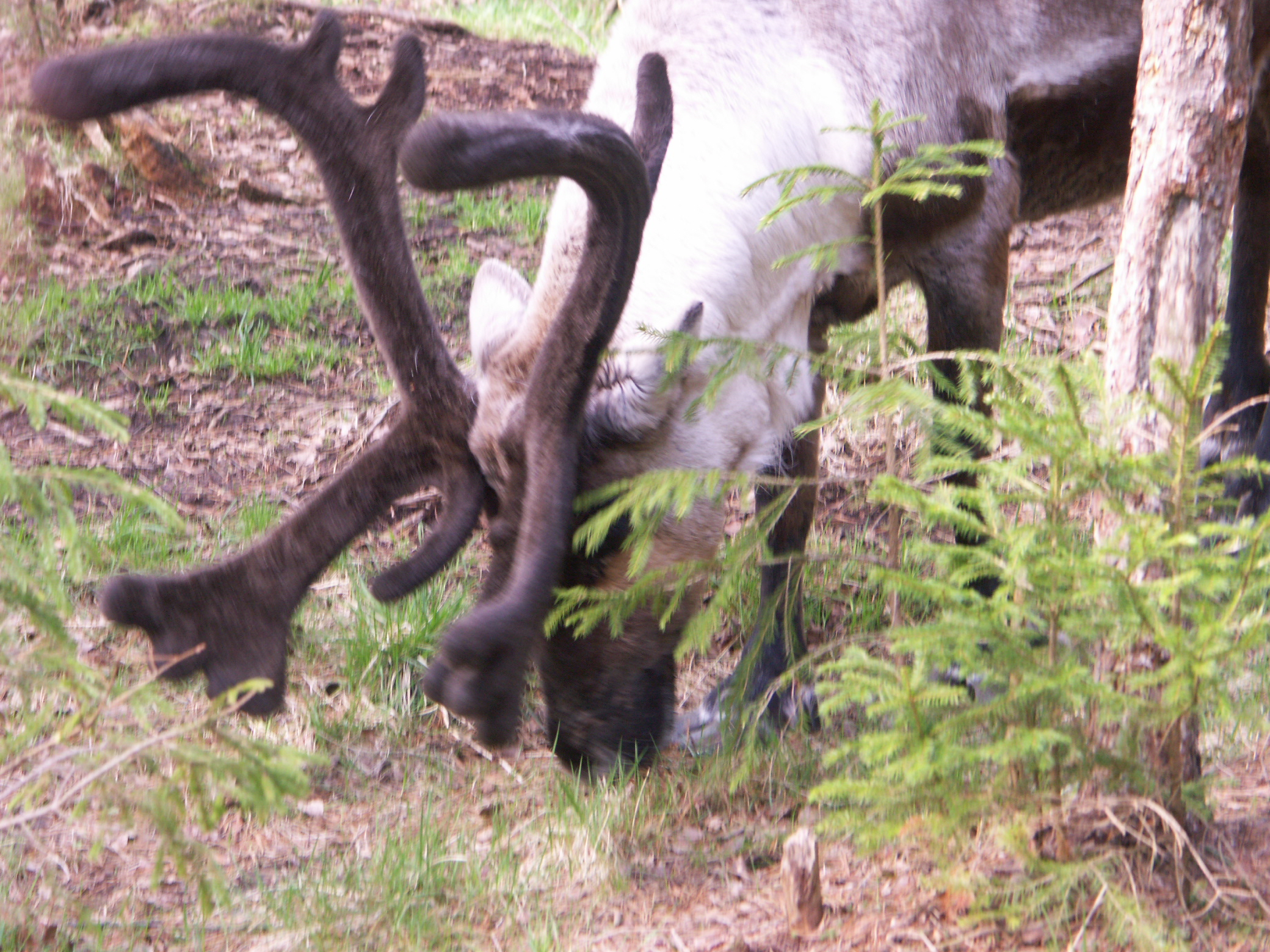
Sweden

Reindeer have developed adaptations for optimal metabolic efficiency during warm months as well as for during cold months. The body composition of reindeer varies highly with the seasons. Of particular interest is the body composition and diet of breeding and non-breeding cows between the seasons. Breeding cows have more body mass than non-breeding cows between the months of March and September with a difference of around 10 kg (22 lb) more than non-breeding cows. From November to December, non-breeding cows have more body mass than breeding cows, as non-breeding cows are able to focus their energies towards storage during colder months rather than lactation and reproduction. Body masses of both breeding and non-breeding cows peaks in September. During the months of March through April, breeding cows have more fat mass than non-breeding cows with a difference of almost 3 kg (6.6 lb). After this, however, non-breeding cows on average have a higher body fat mass than do breeding cows.

The environmental variations play a large part in reindeer nutrition, as winter nutrition is crucial to adult and neonatal survival rates. Lichens are a staple during the winter months as they are a readily available food source, which reduces the reliance on stored body reserves. Lichens are a crucial part of the reindeer's diet; however, they are less prevalent in the diet of pregnant cows compared to that of non-pregnant cows due to lichens' low nutritional value. Although lichens are high in carbohydrates, they are lacking in essential proteins that vascular plants provide. The amount of lichen in a diet decreases in latitude, which results in nutritional stress being higher in areas with low lichen abundance.

In a study of seasonal light-dark cycles of the sleep patterns of reindeer, researchers performed non-invasive electroencephalography (EEG) on reindeer kept in a stable at The Arctic University of Norway. The EEG recordings showed that: (1) the more time reindeer spend ruminating, the less time they spend in non-rapid eye movement sleep (NREM sleep); and (2) a reindeer's brain waves during rumination resemble the brain waves that are present during NREM sleep. These results suggest that, by reducing the time requirement for NREM sleep, reindeer are able to spend more time feeding during the summer months, when food is abundant.

=== Reproduction and life cycle ===
Reindeer mate in late September to early November, and the gestation period is about 228 to 234 days. During the mating season, bulls battle for access to cows. Two bulls will lock each other's antlers together and try to push each other away. The most dominant bulls can collect as many as 15 to 20 cows to mate with. A bull will stop eating during this time and lose much of his body fat reserves.

To calve, "females travel to isolated, relatively predator-free areas such as islands in lakes, peatlands, lake-shores, or tundra." As cows select the habitat for the birth of their calves, they are warier than bulls. Dugmore noted that, in their seasonal migrations, the herd follows a cow for that reason. Newborns weigh on average 6 kg (13 lb). In May or June, the calves are born. After 45 days, the calves are able to graze and forage, but continue suckling until the following autumn when they become independent from their mothers.

Bulls live four years less than cows, whose maximum longevity is about 17 years. Cows with a normal body size and who have had sufficient summer nutrition can begin breeding at any time between the ages of 1 and 3 years. When a cow has undergone nutritional stress, it is possible for her not to reproduce in that year. Dominant bulls, those with larger body size and antler racks, inseminate more than one cow a season.

=== Social structure, migration and range ===
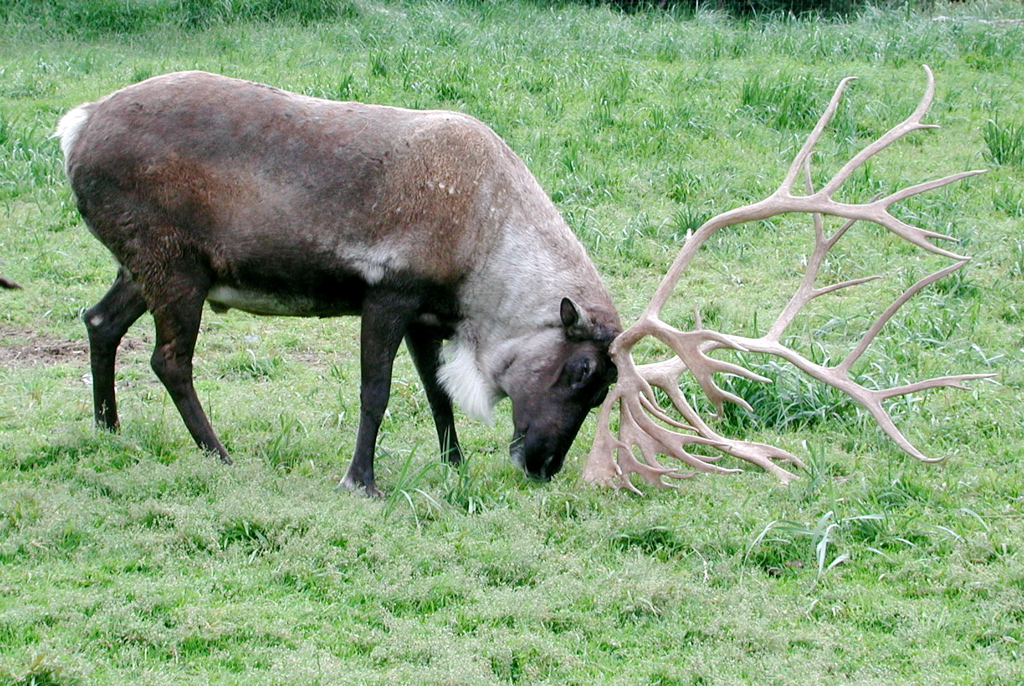
The size of the antlers plays a significant role in establishing the hierarchy in the herd

Some populations of North American caribou; for example, many herds of the barren-ground caribou and some woodland caribou herds in Ungava and northern Labrador migrate the farthest distance of any terrestrial mammal, traveling up to 5,000 km (3,000 mi) a year, and covering 1,000,000 km^{2} (400,000 sq mi). Other North American populations, the boreal woodland caribou for example, are largely sedentary. European populations are known to have shorter migrations. Island populations, such as the Novaya Zemlya and Svalbard reindeer and the Peary caribou, make local movements both within and among islands. Migrating reindeer can be negatively affected by parasite loads. Severely infected individuals are weak and probably have shortened lifespans, but parasite levels vary between populations. Infections create an effect known as culling: infected migrating animals are less likely to complete the migration.

Normally travelling about 19–55 km (12–34 mi) a day while migrating, reindeer can run at speeds of 60–80 km/h (37–50 mph). Young calves can already outrun an Olympic sprinter when they are only 1 day old. During the spring migration, smaller herds will group together to form larger herds of 50,000 to 500,000 animals, but during autumn migrations, the groups become smaller and the reindeer begin to mate. During winter, reindeer travel to forested areas to forage under the snow. By spring, groups leave their winter grounds to go to the calving grounds. A reindeer can swim easily and quickly, normally at about 6.5 km/h (4.0 mph) but, if necessary, at 10 km/h (6.2 mph) and migrating herds will not hesitate to swim across a large lake or broad river.

The barren-ground caribou form large herds and undertake lengthy seasonal migrations from winter feeding grounds in taiga to spring calving grounds and summer range in the tundra. The migrations of the Porcupine ecotype of the barren-ground caribou are among the farthest of any terrestrial mammal. The Greenland caribou, found in southwestern Greenland, is a "mixed migrator" and many individuals do not migrate; those that do migrate less than 60 km (37 mi). Unlike the individual-tending mating system, aggregated rutting, synchronized calving and aggregated post-calving of barren-ground caribou, Greenland caribou have a harem-defense mating system and dispersed calving and they do not aggregate.

Although most wild tundra reindeer migrate between their winter range in taiga and summer range in tundra, some ecotypes or herds are more or less sedentary. Novaya Zemlya reindeer (R. t. pearsoni) formerly wintered on the mainland and migrated across the ice to the islands for summer, but only a few now migrate. Finnish forest reindeer (R. t. fennicus) were formerly distributed in most of the coniferous forest zones south of the tree line, including some mountains, but are now spottily distributed within this zone.

As an adaptation to their Arctic environment, they have lost their circadian rhythm.

== Ecology ==
=== Distribution and habitat ===
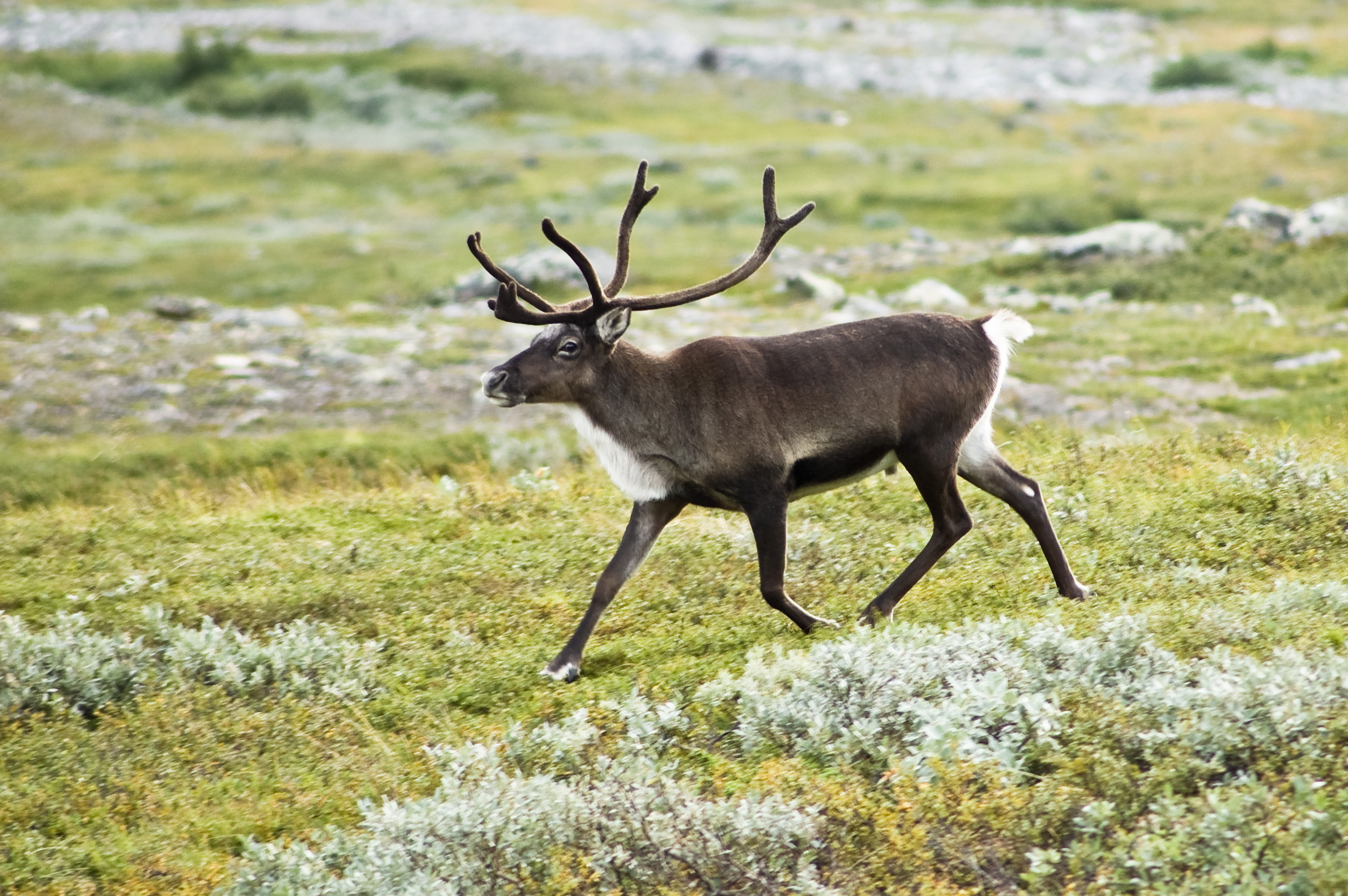
Sweden

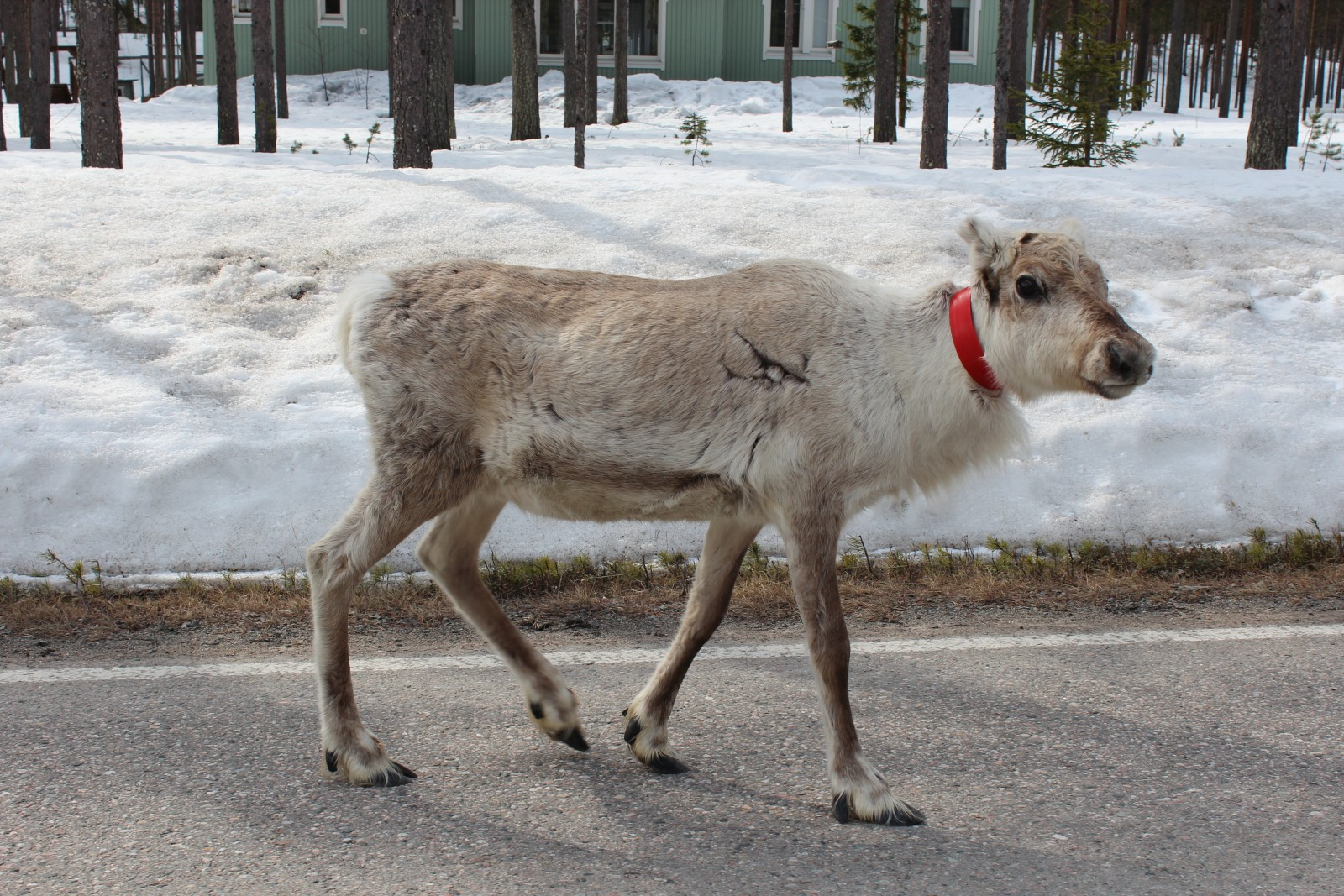
Suomussalmi, Finland

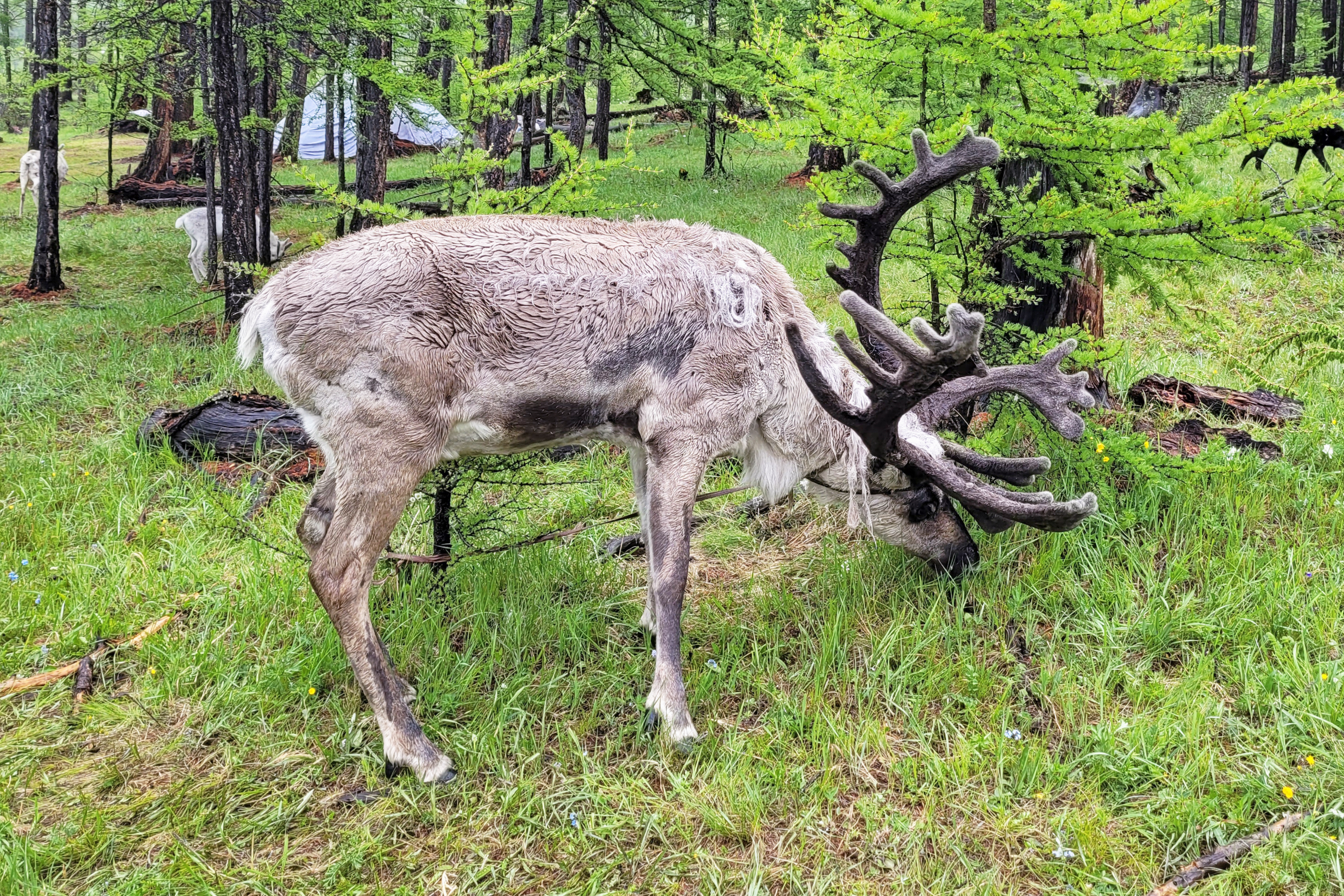
Near Lake Khövsgöl in Mongolia

Originally, the reindeer was found in Scandinavia, Eastern Europe, Greenland, Russia, Mongolia and northern China north of the 50th latitude. In North America, it was found in Canada, Alaska, and the northern contiguous United States from Maine to Washington. In the 19th century, it was still present in southern Idaho. Even in historical times, it probably occurred naturally in Ireland, and it is believed to have lived in Scotland until the 12th century, when the last reindeer were hunted in Orkney. During the Late Pleistocene Epoch, reindeer occurred further south in North America, such as in Nevada, Tennessee, and Alabama, and as far south as Spain in Europe. Though their range retreated northwards during the terminal Pleistocene, reindeer returned to Northern Europe during the Younger Dryas. Today, wild reindeer have disappeared from these areas, especially from the southern parts, where it vanished almost everywhere. Large populations of wild reindeer are still found in Norway, Finland, Siberia, Greenland, Alaska and Canada.

According to Grubb (2005), Rangifer is "circumboreal in the tundra and taiga" from "Svalbard, Norway, Finland, Russia, Alaska (USA) and Canada including most Arctic islands, and Greenland, south to northern Mongolia, China (Inner Mongolia), Sakhalin Island, and USA (northern Idaho and Great Lakes region)." Reindeer were introduced to, and are feral in, "Iceland, Kerguelen Islands, South Georgia Island, Pribilof Islands, St. Matthew Island"; a free-ranging semi-domesticated herd is also present in Scotland.

There is strong regional variation in Rangifer herd size. There are large population differences among individual herds and the size of individual herds has varied greatly since 1970. The largest of all herds (in Taimyr, Russia) has varied between 400,000 and 1,000,000; the second largest herd (at the George River in Canada) has varied between 28,000 and 385,000.

While Rangifer is a widespread and numerous genus in the northern Holarctic, being present in both tundra and taiga (boreal forest), by 2013, many herds had "unusually low numbers" and their winter ranges in particular were smaller than they used to be. Caribou and reindeer numbers have fluctuated historically, but many herds are in decline across their range. This global decline is linked to climate change for northern migratory herds and industrial disturbance of habitat for non-migratory herds. Barren-ground caribou are susceptible to the effects of climate change due to a mismatch in the phenological process between the availability of food during the calving period.

In November 2016, it was reported that more than 81,000 reindeer in Russia had died as a result of climate change. Longer autumns, leading to increased amounts of freezing rain, created a few inches of ice over lichen, causing many reindeer to starve to death.

=== Diet ===
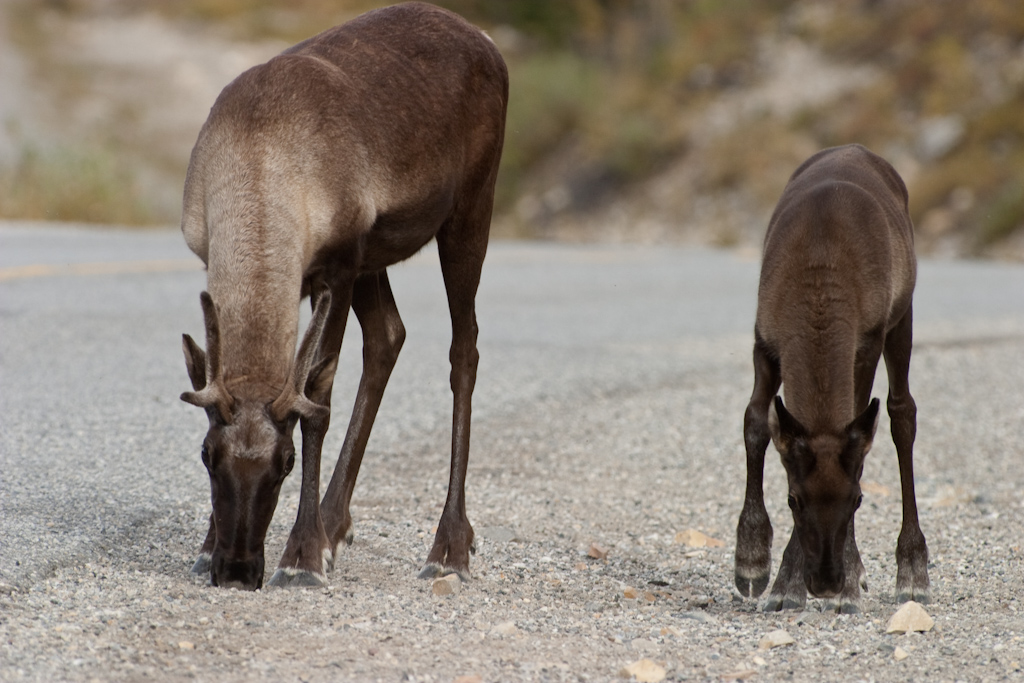
Two caribou licking salt from a roadway in British Columbia

Reindeer are ruminants, having a four-chambered stomach. They mainly eat lichens in winter, especially reindeer lichen (Cladonia rangiferina); they are the only large mammal able to metabolize lichen. Many lichens synthesize toxic phenolic compounds, such as usnic acid, that protect them from ultraviolet radiation and herbivory. Reindeer can eat lichen because their rumen contains a reindeer-specific bacterium called Eubacterium rangiferina. This bacterium detoxifies usnic acid and may use it as an energy source. Unlike other bacteria present in the rumen, E. rangiferina can grow in the presence of usnic acid and rapidly degrades usnic acid in reindeer stomachs. They are also the only animals (except for some gastropods) in which the enzyme lichenase, which breaks down lichenin to glucose, has been found. Reindeer also eat the leaves of willows and birches, as well as sedges and grasses, especially in the warmer months.

Reindeer are osteophagous; they are known to gnaw and partly consume shed antlers as a dietary supplement and in some extreme cases will cannibalise each other's antlers before shedding. There is also some evidence to suggest that on occasion, especially in the spring when they are nutritionally stressed, they will feed on small rodents (such as lemmings), fish (such as the Arctic char (Salvelinus alpinus)), and bird eggs. Reindeer herded by the Chukchis have been known to devour mushrooms enthusiastically in late summer.

During the Arctic summer, when there is continuous daylight, reindeer change their sleeping pattern from one synchronised with the sun to an ultradian pattern, in which they sleep when they need to digest food.

δ^{13}C_{C} values indicate reindeer living in the region around Biśnik Cave exhibited minimal ecological change during the transition from MIS 3 to MIS 2. Dental mesowear indicates that during the Late Pleistocene, reindeer living in central Alaska had highly abrasive diets similar to wild horses.

=== Predators ===
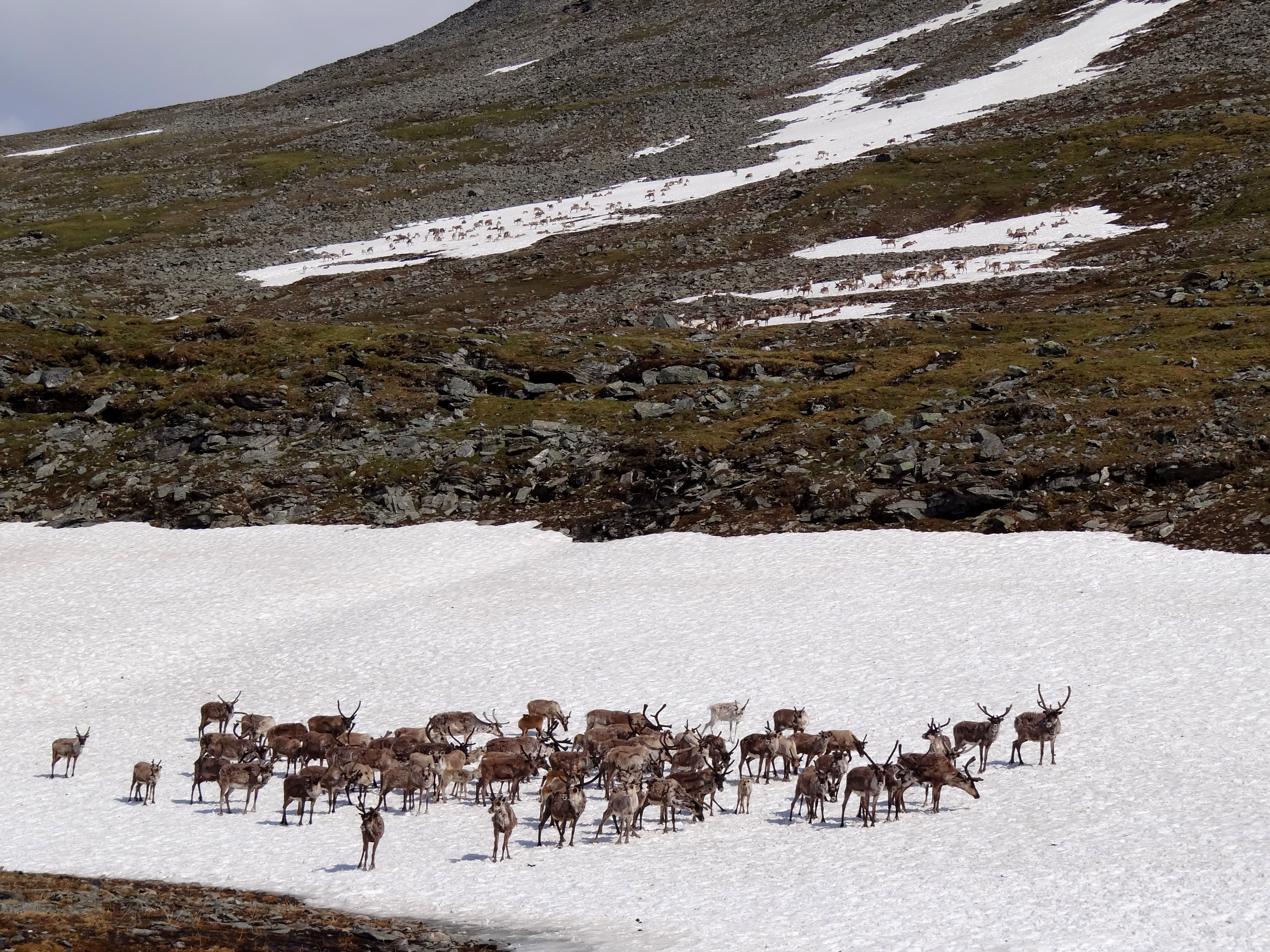
Standing on snow to avoid bloodsucking insects

A variety of predators prey heavily on reindeer, including overhunting by people in some areas, which contributes to the decline of populations.

Golden eagles prey on calves and are the most prolific hunter on the calving grounds. Wolverines will take newborn calves or birthing cows, as well as (less commonly) infirm adults.

Brown bears and polar bears prey on reindeer of all ages but, like wolverines, are most likely to attack weaker animals, such as calves and sick reindeer, since healthy adult reindeer can usually outpace a bear. The gray wolf is the most effective natural predator of adult reindeer and sometimes takes large numbers, especially during the winter. Some gray wolf packs, as well as individual grizzly bears in Canada, may follow and live off of a particular reindeer herd year-round.

In 2020, scientists on Svalbard witnessed, and were able to film for the first time, a polar bear attack reindeer, driving one into the ocean, where the polar bear caught up with and killed it. The same bear successfully repeated this hunting technique the next day. On Svalbard, reindeer remains account for 27.3% in polar bear scats, suggesting that they "may be a significant part of the polar bear's diet in that area".

Additionally, as carrion, reindeer may be scavenged opportunistically by red and Arctic foxes, various species of eagles, hawks and falcons, and common ravens.

Bloodsucking insects, such as mosquitoes, black flies, and especially the reindeer warble fly or reindeer botfly (Hypoderma tarandi) and the reindeer nose botfly (Cephenemyia trompe), are a plague to reindeer during the summer and can cause enough stress to inhibit feeding and calving behaviors. An adult reindeer will lose perhaps about 1 L (0.22 imp gal; 0.26 US gal) of blood to biting insects for every week it spends in the tundra. The population numbers of some of these predators is influenced by the migration of reindeer. Tormenting insects keep caribou on the move, searching for windy areas like hilltops and mountain ridges, rock reefs, lakeshore and forest openings, or snow patches that offer respite from the buzzing horde. Gathering in large herds is another strategy that caribou use to block insects.

Reindeer are good swimmers and, in one case, the entire body of a reindeer was found in the stomach of a Greenland shark (Somniosus microcephalus), a species found in the far northern North Atlantic.

=== Other threats ===
White-tailed deer (Odocoileus virginianus) commonly carry meningeal worm or brainworm (Parelaphostrongylus tenuis), a nematode parasite that causes reindeer, moose (Alces alces), elk (Cervus canadensis), and mule deer (Odocoileus hemionus) to develop fatal neurological symptoms which include a loss of fear of humans. White-tailed deer that carry this worm are partially immune to it.

Changes in climate and habitat beginning in the 20th century have expanded range overlap between white-tailed deer and caribou, increasing the frequency of infection within the reindeer population. This increase in infection is a concern for wildlife managers. Human activities, such as "clear-cutting forestry practices, forest fires, and the clearing for agriculture, roadways, railways, and power lines," favor the conversion of habitats into the preferred habitat of the white-tailed deer – "open forest interspersed with meadows, clearings, grasslands, and riparian flatlands." Towards the end of the Soviet Union, there was increasingly open admission from the Soviet government that reindeer numbers were being negatively affected by human activity, and that this must be remediated especially by supporting reindeer breeding by native herders.

== Conservation ==
=== Current status ===
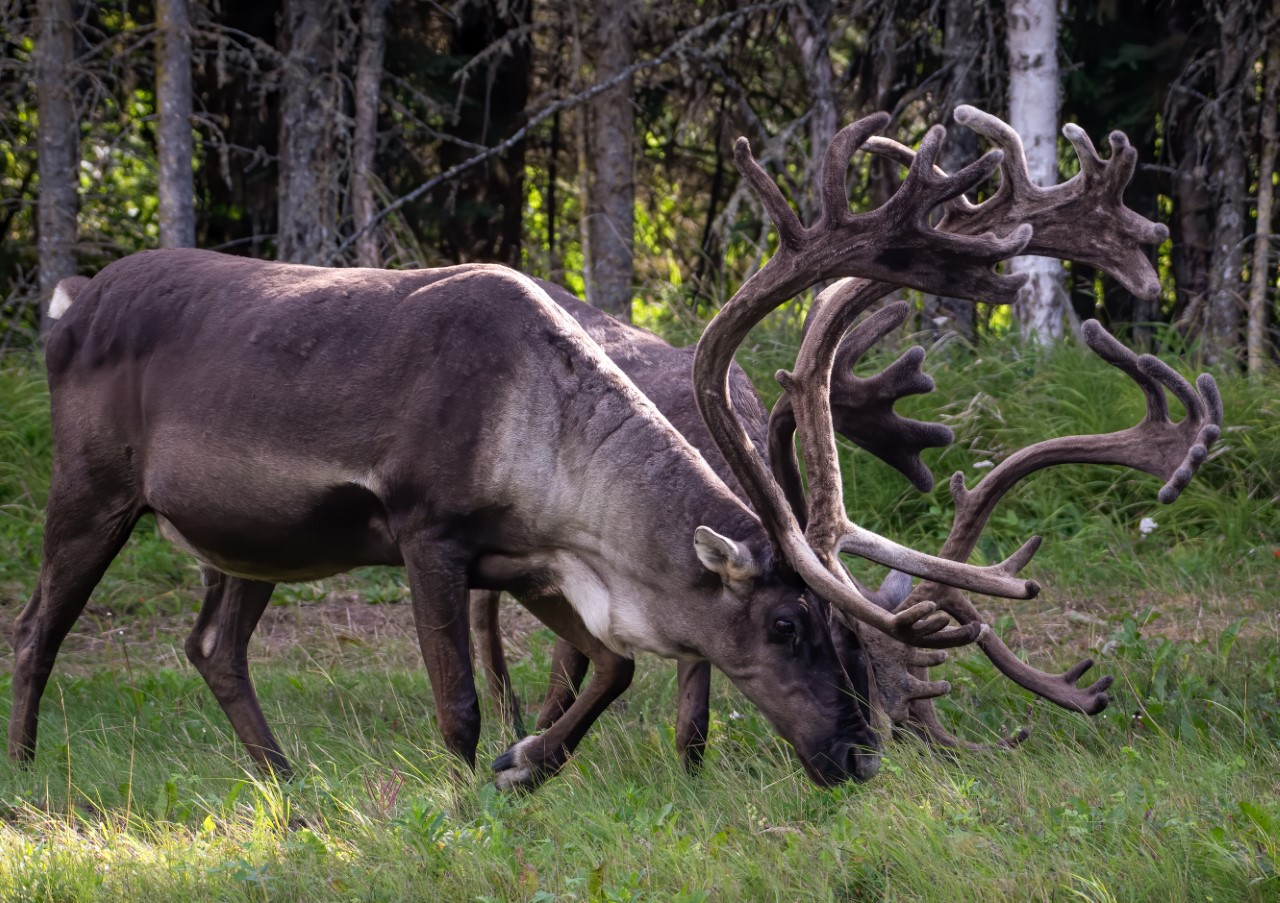
Two caribou grazing in the Kenai National Wildlife Refuge

According to the IUCN, Rangifer tarandus, as a species, is not endangered because of its overall large population and its widespread range, but, as of 2015, the IUCN has classified the reindeer as Vulnerable due to an observed population decline of 40% over the last +25 years. Some reindeer species and subspecies are rare and three subspecies have already become extinct.

In North America, Dawson's caribou and the East Greenland caribou both became extinct in the early 20th century, the Peary caribou is designated as Endangered, the boreal woodland caribou is designated as Threatened and some individual populations are endangered as well. While the barren-ground caribou is not designated as Threatened, many individual herds—including some of the largest—are declining and there is much concern at the local level. Grant's caribou, a small, pale subspecies endemic to the western end of the Alaska Peninsula and the adjacent islands, has not been assessed as to its conservation status.

The status of the Dolphin-Union "herd" was upgraded to Endangered in 2017. In NWT, Dolphin-Union caribou were listed as Special Concern under the NWT Species at Risk (NWT) Act (2013).

Both the Selkirk Mountains caribou (Southern Mountain population DU9) and the Rocky Mountain caribou (Central Mountain population DU8) are classified as Endangered in Canada in regions such as southeastern British Columbia at the Canada–United States border, along the Columbia and Kootenay Rivers and around Kootenay Lake. The Rocky Mountain caribou has been extirpated from Banff National Park, but a small population remains in Jasper National Park and in mountain ranges to the northwest into British Columbia. Montane caribou are now considered extirpated in the contiguous United States, including Washington and Idaho. Osborn's caribou (Northern Mountain population DU7) is classified as Threatened in Canada.

In Eurasia, the Sakhalin reindeer is extinct (and has been replaced by domestic reindeer (R. t.. forma domesticus)) and the Novaya Zemlya reindeer has also been replaced by domestic reindeer throughout most of its range, although some wild reindeer of this subspecies still persist in the northern part of it. Many Siberian tundra reindeer herds have declined, some dangerously, but the Taymir herd remains strong and in total about 940,000 wild Siberian tundra reindeer were estimated in 2010.

There is strong regional variation in Rangifer herd size. By 2013, many caribou herds in North America had "unusually low numbers" and their winter ranges in particular were smaller than they used to be. Caribou numbers have fluctuated historically, but many herds are in decline across their range. There are many factors contributing to the decline in numbers.

=== Boreal woodland caribou ===
Ongoing human development of their habitat has caused populations of boreal woodland caribou to disappear from their original southern range. In particular, boreal woodland caribou were extirpated in many areas of eastern North America in the beginning of the 20th century. Professor Marco Musiani of the University of Calgary said in a statement that "The woodland caribou is already an endangered subspecies in southern Canada and the United States...[The] warming of the planet means the disappearance of their critical habitat in these regions. Caribou need undisturbed lichen-rich environments and these types of habitats are disappearing."

Boreal woodland caribou were designated as Threatened in 2002 by the Committee on the Status of Endangered Wildlife in Canada, (COSEWIC). Environment Canada reported in 2011 that there were approximately 34 000 boreal woodland caribou in 51 ranges remaining in Canada (Environment Canada, 2011b). "According to Geist, the "woodland caribou is highly endangered throughout its distribution right into Ontario."

In 2002, the Atlantic-Gaspésie population DU11 of the boreal woodland caribou was designated as Endangered by COSEWIC. The small isolated population of 200 animals was at risk from predation and habitat loss.

=== Peary caribou ===
In 1991, COSEWIC assigned "endangered status" to the Banks Island and High Arctic populations of the Peary caribou. The Low Arctic population of the Peary caribou was designated as Threatened. In 2004, all three were designated as "endangered." In 2015, COSEWIC restored the status to Threatened.

== Relationship with humans ==
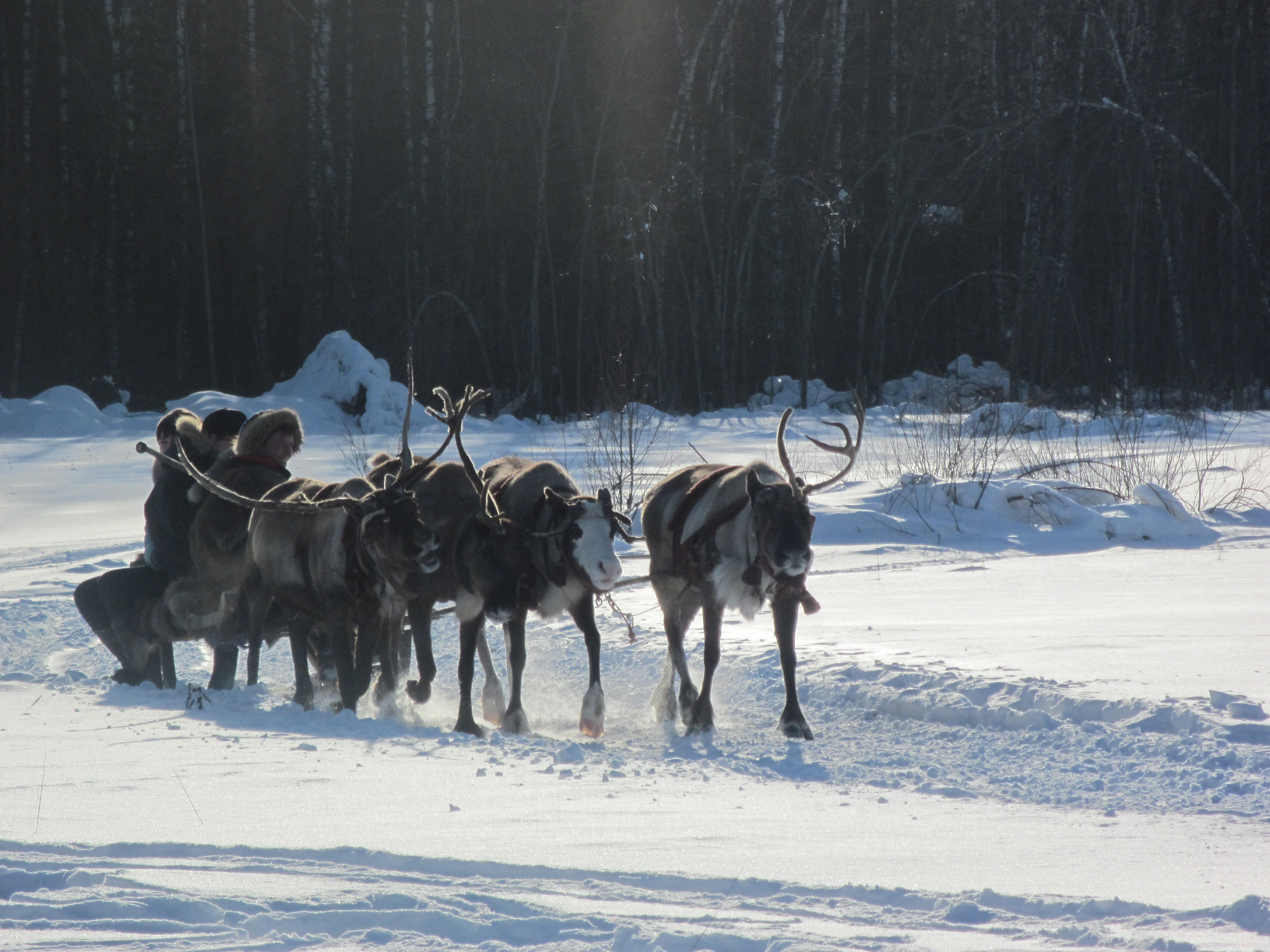
Pulling a sled in Russia

Arctic peoples have depended on reindeer for food, clothing, and shelter. European prehistoric cave paintings represent both tundra and forest forms, the latter either the Finnish forest reindeer or the narrow-nosed reindeer, an eastern Siberian forest subspecies. Canadian examples include the Caribou Inuit, the inland-dwelling Inuit of the Kivalliq Region in Northern Canada, the Caribou Clan in the Yukon, the Iñupiat, the Inuvialuit, the Hän, the Northern Tutchone, and the Gwichʼin (who followed the Porcupine caribou ecotype for millennia). Hunting wild reindeer and herding of semi-domesticated reindeer are important to several Arctic and subarctic peoples such as the Duhalar for meat, hides, antlers, milk, and transportation.

Reindeer have been domesticated at least two and probably three times, in each case from wild Eurasian tundra reindeer after the Last Glacial Maximum (LGM). Recognizably different breeds of the domestic reindeer (R. t. forma domesticus) include those of the Evenk, Even, and Chukotka-Khargin people of Yakutia and the Nenets breed from the Nenets Autonomous district and Murmansk region; the Tuvans, Todzhans, Tofa (Tofalars in the Irkutsk Region), the Soyots (the Republic of Buryatia), and the Dukha (also known as Tsaatan, the Khubsugul) in the Province of Mongolia. The Sámi (Sápmi) have also depended on reindeer herding and fishing for centuries. In Sápmi, reindeer are used to pull a pulk, a Nordic sled.

The reindeer has an important economic role for all circumpolar peoples, including the Sámi, the Swedes, the Norwegians, the Finns and the Northwestern Russians in Europe, the Nenets, the Khanty, the Evenki, the Yukaghirs, the Chukchi and the Koryaks in Asia and the Inuit in North America. It is believed that domestication started between the Bronze and the Iron Ages. Siberian reindeer owners also use the reindeer to ride on (Siberian reindeer are larger than their Scandinavian relatives). For breeders, a single owner may own hundreds or even thousands of animals. The numbers of Russian and Scandinavian reindeer herders have been drastically reduced since 1990. The sale of fur and meat is an important source of income. Reindeer were introduced into Alaska near the end of the 19th century; they interbred with the native caribou subspecies there. Reindeer herders on the Seward Peninsula have experienced significant losses to their herds from animals (such as wolves) following the wild caribou during their migrations.

Reindeer meat is popular in the Scandinavian countries. Reindeer meatballs are sold canned. Sautéed reindeer is the best-known dish in Sápmi. In Alaska and Finland, reindeer sausage is sold in supermarkets and grocery stores. Reindeer meat is very tender and lean. It can be prepared fresh, but also dried, salted and hot- and cold-smoked. In addition to meat, almost all of the internal organs of reindeer can be eaten, some being traditional dishes. Furthermore, Lapin Poron liha, fresh reindeer meat completely produced and packed in Finnish Lapland, is protected in Europe with PDO classification.

Reindeer antlers are powdered and sold as an aphrodisiac, or as a nutritional or medicinal supplement, to Asian markets.

The blood of the caribou was supposedly mixed with alcohol as drink by hunters and loggers in colonial Quebec to counter the cold. This drink is now enjoyed without the blood as a wine and whiskey drink named Caribou.

=== Indigenous North Americans ===
Caribou are still hunted in Greenland and in North America. In the traditional lifestyles of some of Canada's Inuit peoples and northern First Nations peoples, Alaska Natives, and the Kalaallit of Greenland, caribou is an important source of food, clothing, shelter and tools.

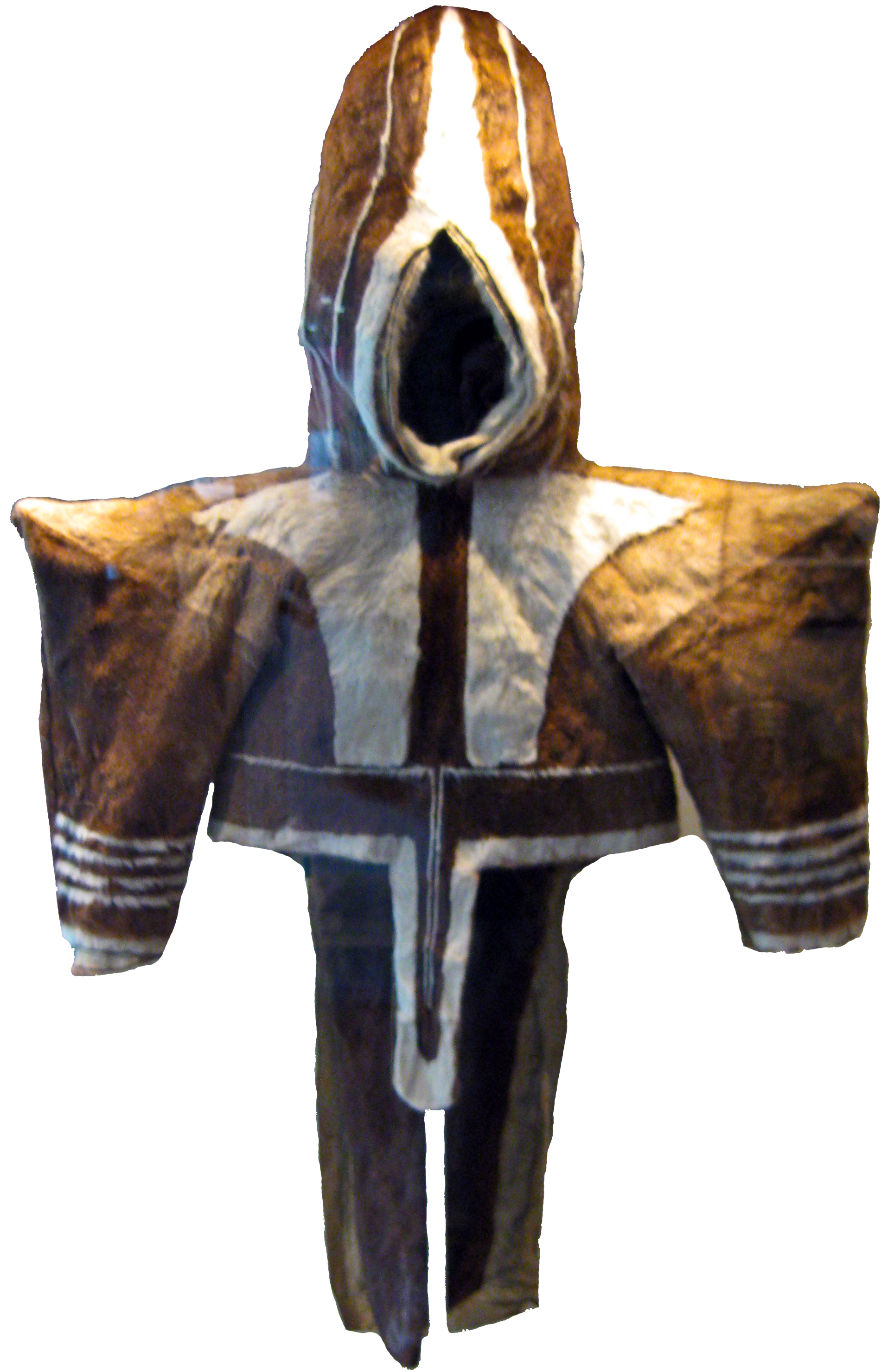
An early 20th century Inuit parka made of caribou skin

The Caribou Inuit are inland-dwelling Inuit in present-day Nunavut's Kivalliq Region (formerly the Keewatin Region), Canada. They subsisted on caribou year-round, eating dried caribou meat in the winter. The Ahiarmiut are Caribou Inuit that followed the Qamanirjuaq barren-ground caribou herd.

There is an Inuit saying in the Kivalliq Region:

The caribou feeds the wolf, but it is the wolf who keeps the caribou strong.

— Kivalliq region

Elder Chief of Koyukuk and chair for the Western Arctic Caribou Herd Working Group Benedict Jones, or Kʼughtoʼoodenoolʼoʼ, represents the Middle Yukon River, Alaska. His grandmother was a member of the Caribou Clan, who travelled with the caribou as a means to survive. In 1939, they were living their traditional lifestyle at one of their hunting camps in Koyukuk near the location of what is now the Koyukuk National Wildlife Refuge. His grandmother made a pair of new mukluks in one day. Kʼughtoʼoodenoolʼoʼ recounted a story told by an elder, who "worked on the steamboats during the gold rush days out on the Yukon." In late August, the caribou migrated from the Alaska Range up north to Huslia, Koyukuk and the Tanana area. One year when the steamboat was unable to continue, they ran into a caribou herd estimated to number 1 million animals, migrating across the Yukon. "They tied up for seven days waiting for the caribou to cross. They ran out of wood for the steamboats, and had to go back down 40 miles [64 km] to the wood pile to pick up some more wood. On the tenth day, they came back and they said there was still caribou going across the river night and day."

The Gwichʼin, an indigenous people of northwestern Canada and northeastern Alaska, have been dependent on the international migratory Porcupine caribou ecotype for millennia. To them, caribou—vadzaih—is the cultural symbol and a keystone subsistence species of the Gwich'in, just as the American bison (Bison bison) is to the Plains Native Americans. Innovative language revitalisation projects are underway to document the language and to enhance the writing and translation skills of younger Gwich'in speakers. In one project, lead research associate and fluent speaker Gwich'in elder Kenneth Frank works with linguists who include young Gwich'in speakers affiliated with the Alaska Native Language Center at the University of Alaska in Fairbanks to document traditional knowledge of caribou anatomy. The main goal of the research was to "elicit not only what the Gwich'in know about caribou anatomy, but how they see caribou and what they say and believe about caribou that defines themselves, their dietary and nutritional needs, and their subsistence way of life." Elders have identified at least 150 descriptive Gwich'in names for all of the bones, organs and tissues. Associated with the caribou's anatomy are not just descriptive Gwich'in names for all of the body parts, including bones, organs, and tissues, but also "an encyclopedia of stories, songs, games, toys, ceremonies, traditional tools, skin clothing, personal names and surnames, and a highly developed ethnic cuisine." In the 1980s, Gwich'in Traditional Management Practices were established to protect the Porcupine caribou, upon which the Gwich'in depend. They "codified traditional principles of caribou management into tribal law" which include "limits on the harvest of caribou and procedures to be followed in processing and transporting caribou meat" and limits on the number of caribou to be taken per hunting trip.

=== Indigenous Eurasians ===
Reindeer herding has been vital for the subsistence of several Eurasian nomadic indigenous peoples living in the circumpolar Arctic zone such as the Sámi, Nenets, and Komi. Reindeer are used to provide renewable sources and reliable transportation. In Mongolia, the Dukha are known as the reindeer people. They are credited as one of the world's earliest domesticators. The Dukha diet consists mainly of reindeer dairy products.

Reindeer husbandry is common in northern Fennoscandia (northern Norway, Sweden and Finland) and the Russian North. In some human groups such as the Eveny, wild reindeer and domestic reindeer are treated as different kinds of beings.

=== Husbandry ===
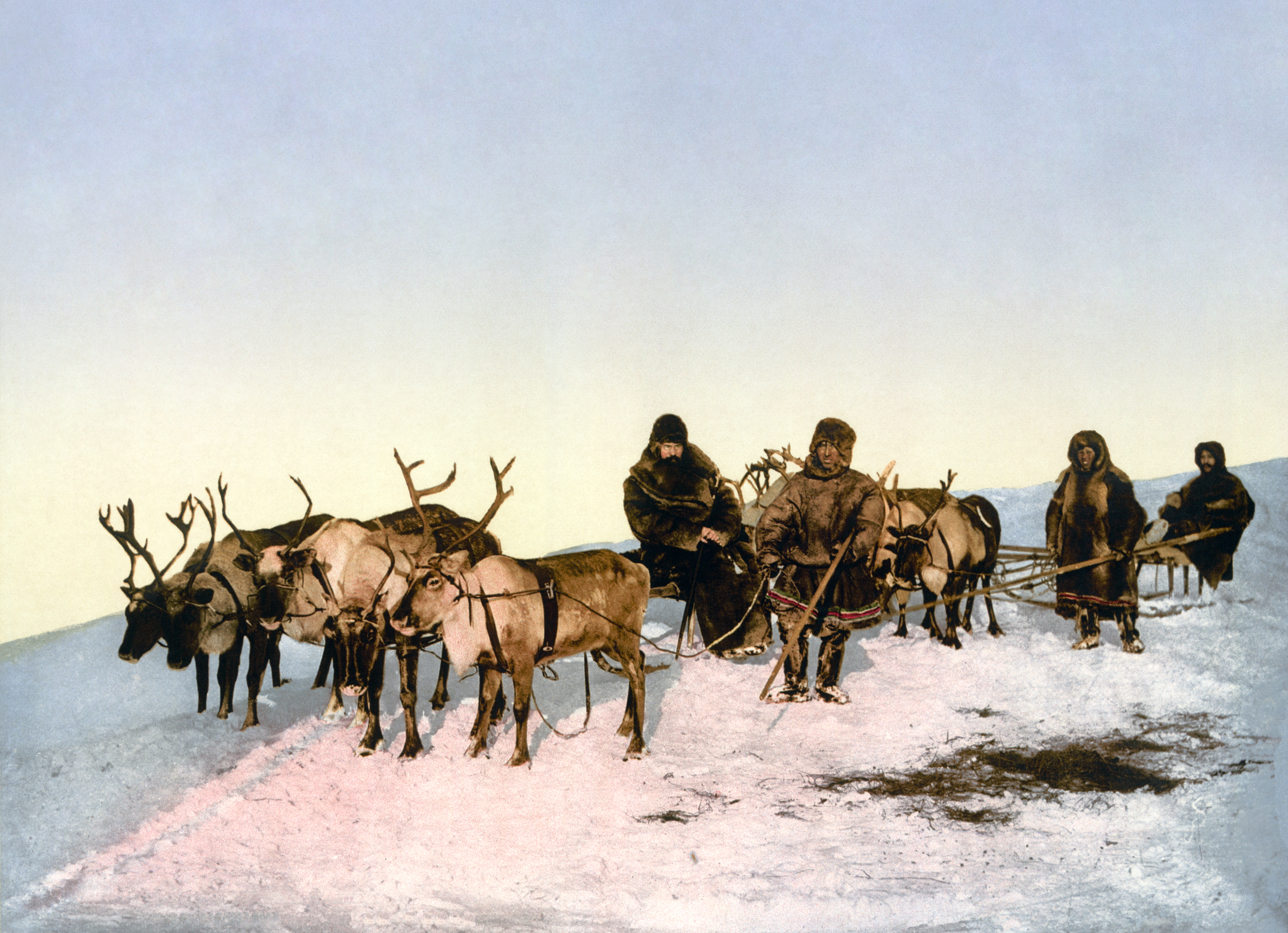
A team pulling a sled near Arkhangelsk, Russia, late 19th-century photochrom

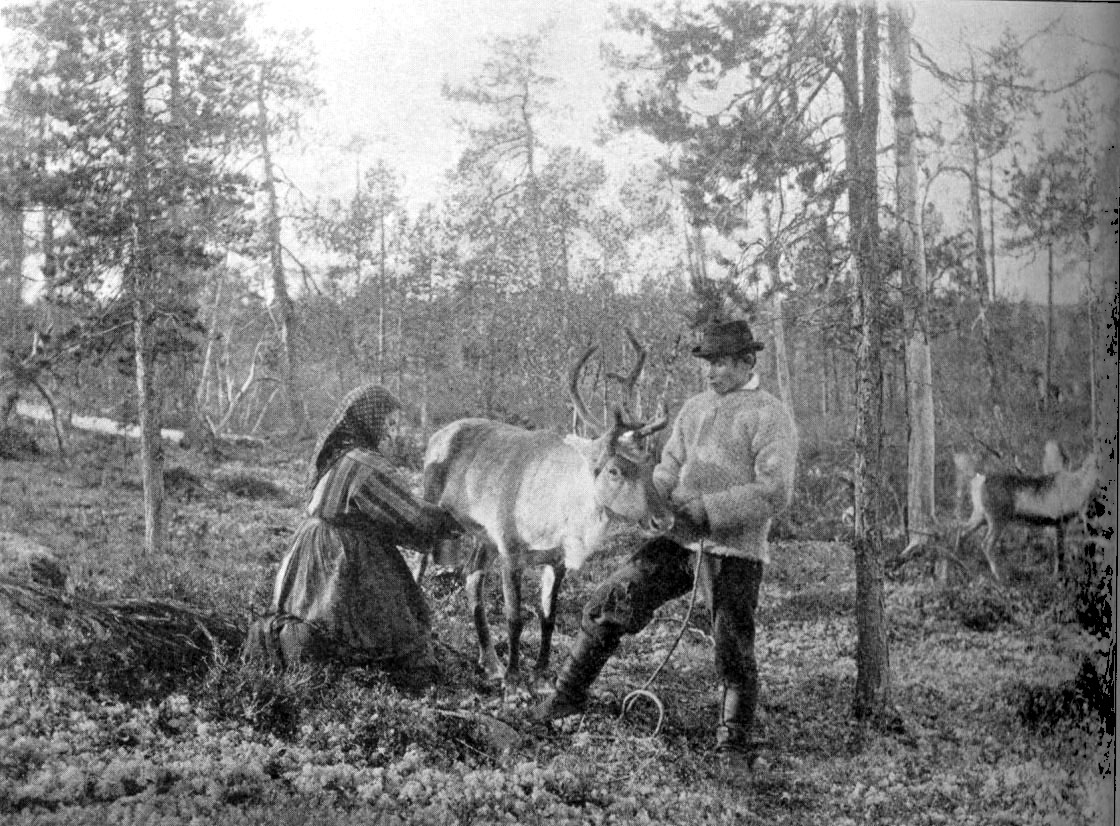
Milking in Western Finnmark, Norway, 19th century

The reindeer is the only successfully semi-domesticated deer on a large scale in the world. Reindeer in northern Fennoscandia (northern Norway, Sweden and Finland) as well in the Kola Peninsula and Yakutia in Russia, are mostly semi-domesticated reindeer, ear-marked by their owners. Some reindeer in the area are truly domesticated, mostly used as draught animals (nowadays commonly for tourist entertainment and races, traditionally important for the nomadic Sámi). Domestic reindeer (R. t. forma domesticus) have also been used for milk, e.g., in Norway.

There are only two genetically pure populations of wild reindeer in Northern Europe: wild mountain reindeer (R. t. tarandus) that live in central Norway, with a population in 2007 of between 6,000 and 8,400 animals; and wild Finnish forest reindeer (R. t. fennicus) that live in central and eastern Finland and in Russian Karelia, with a population of about 4,350, plus 1,500 in Arkhangelsk Oblast and 2,500 in Komi. East of Arkhangelsk, both wild Siberian tundra reindeer (R. t. sibiricus) (some herds are very large) and domestic reindeer (R. t. forma domesticus) occur with almost no interbreeding by wild reindeer into domestic clades and none the other way (Kharzinova et al. 2018; Rozhkov et al. 2020).

DNA analysis indicates that reindeer were independently domesticated at least twice: in Fennoscandia and Western Russia (and possibly also Eastern Russia). Reindeer have been herded for centuries by several Arctic and subarctic peoples, including the Sámi, the Nenets and the Yakuts. They are raised for their meat, hides and antlers and, to a lesser extent, for milk and transportation. Reindeer are not considered fully domesticated, as they generally roam free on pasture grounds. In traditional nomadic herding, reindeer herders migrate with their herds between coastal and inland areas according to an annual migration route and herds are keenly tended. However, reindeer were not bred in captivity, though they were tamed for milking as well as for use as draught animals or beasts of burden. Millais (1915), for example, shows a photograph (Plate LXXX) of an "Okhotsk Reindeer" saddled for riding (the rider standing behind it) beside an officer astride a steppe pony that is only slightly larger. Domestic reindeer are shorter-legged and heavier than their wild counterparts. In Scandinavia, management of reindeer herds is primarily conducted through siida, a traditional Sámi form of cooperative association.

The use of reindeer for transportation is common among the nomadic peoples of the Russian North (but not any more in Scandinavia). Although a sled drawn by 20 reindeer will cover no more than 20–25 km (12–16 mi) a day (compared to 7–10 km (4.3–6.2 mi) on foot, 70–80 km (43–50 mi) by a dog sled loaded with cargo and 150–180 km (93–112 mi) by a dog sled without cargo), it has the advantage that the reindeer will discover their own food, while a pack of 5–7 sled dogs requires 10–14 kg (22–31 lb) of fresh fish a day.

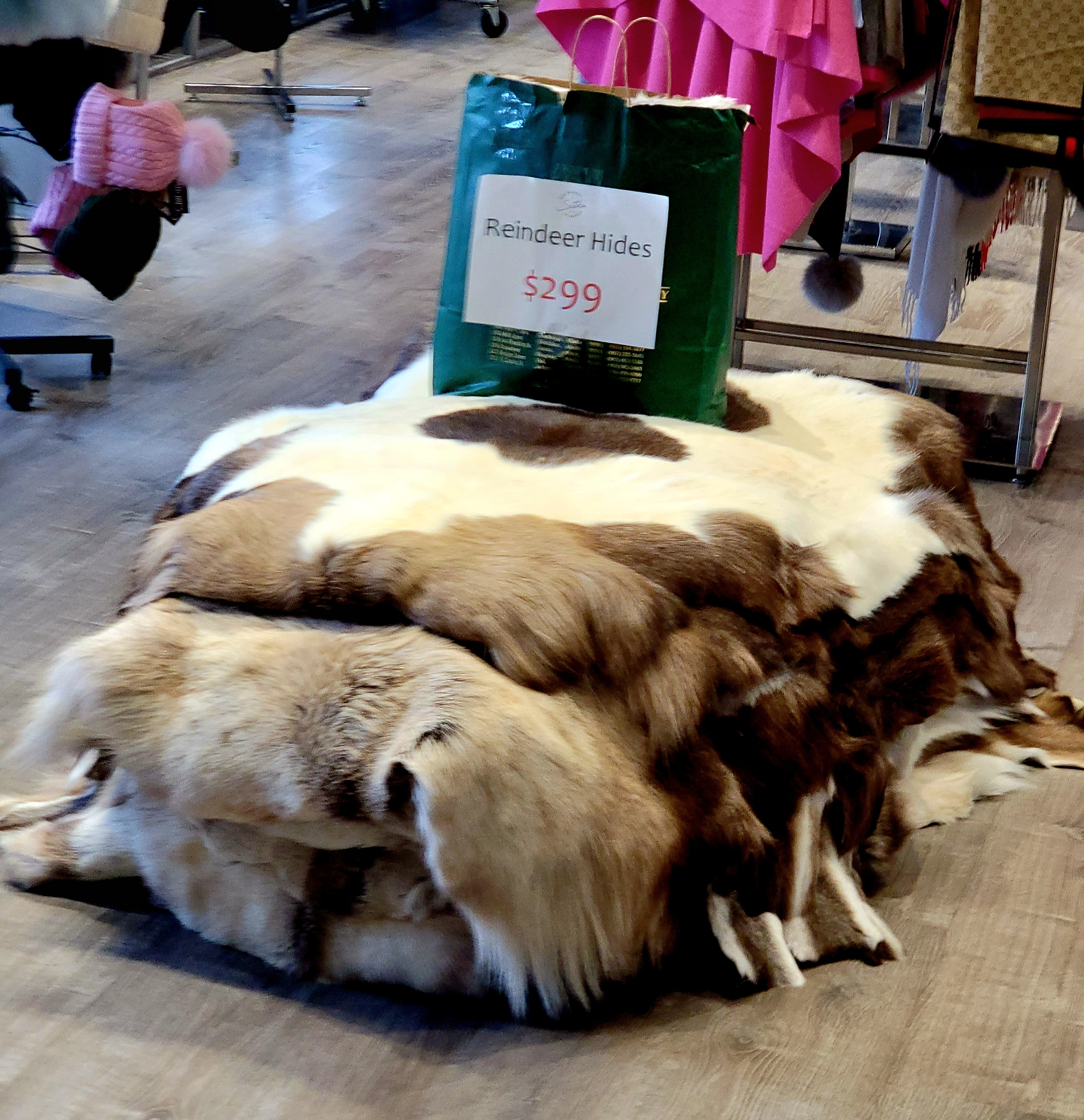
Reindeer hides for sale in Sitka, Alaska

The use of reindeer as semi-domesticated livestock in Alaska was introduced in the late 19th century by the United States Revenue Cutter Service, with assistance from Sheldon Jackson, as a means of providing a livelihood for Alaska Natives. Reindeer were imported first from Siberia and later also from Norway. A regular mail run in Wales, Alaska, used a sleigh drawn by reindeer. In Alaska, reindeer herders use satellite telemetry to track their herds, using online maps and databases to chart the herd's progress.

Domestic reindeer (R. t. forma domesticus) are mostly found in northern Fennoscandia and the Russian North, with a herd of approximately 150 to 170 reindeer living around the Cairngorms region in Scotland. The last remaining wild tundra reindeer in Europe are found in portions of southern Norway. The International Centre for Reindeer Husbandry (ICR), a circumpolar organisation, was established in 2005 by the Norwegian government. ICR represents over 20 indigenous reindeer peoples and about 100,000 reindeer herders in nine different national states. In Finland, there are about 6,000 reindeer herders, most of whom keep small herds of less than 50 reindeer to raise additional income. With 185,000 reindeer (as of 2001), the industry produces 2,000 metric tons (2,200 short tons) of reindeer meat and generates 35 million euros annually. 70% of the meat is sold to slaughterhouses. Reindeer herders are eligible for national and European Union (EU) agricultural subsidies, which constituted 15% of their income. Reindeer herding is of central importance for the local economies of small communities in sparsely populated rural Sápmi.

Currently, many reindeer herders are heavily dependent on diesel fuel to provide for electric generators and snowmobile transportation, although solar photovoltaic systems can be used to reduce diesel dependency.

Miniatures of reindeer from Olaus Magnus's 1539 Carta marina

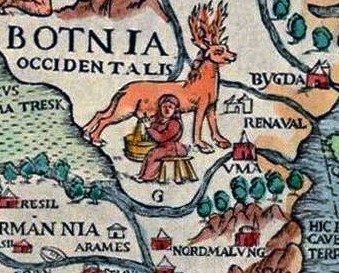
Milking

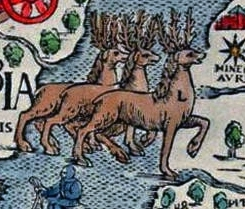
Crossing frozen water

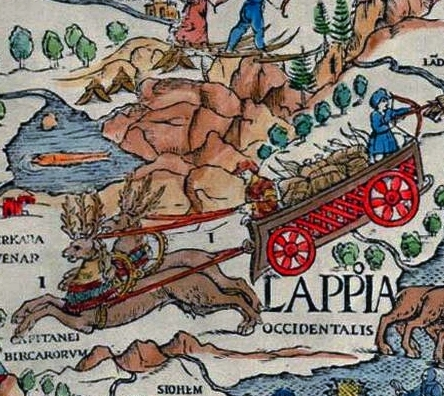
Drawing a wagon

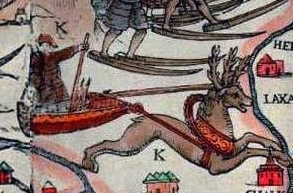
Drawing a one-man sled

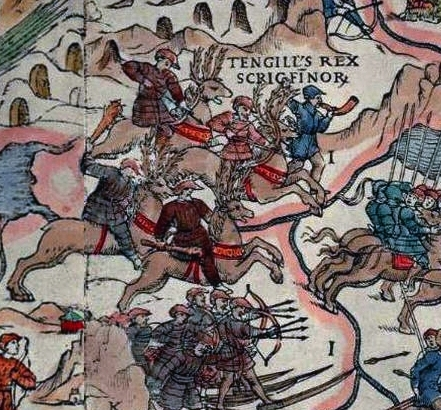
Reindeer-mounted cavalry

=== History ===
Reindeer hunting by humans has a very long history.

Wild reindeer "may well be the species of single greatest importance in the entire anthropological literature on hunting."

Both Aristotle and Theophrastus have short accounts – probably based on the same source – of an ox-sized deer species, named tarandos, living in the land of the Bodines in Scythia, which was able to change the color of its fur in order to obtain camouflage. The latter is probably a misunderstanding of the seasonal change in the color of the fur. The descriptions have been interpreted as being those of reindeer living in the southern Ural Mountains in c. 350 BC.

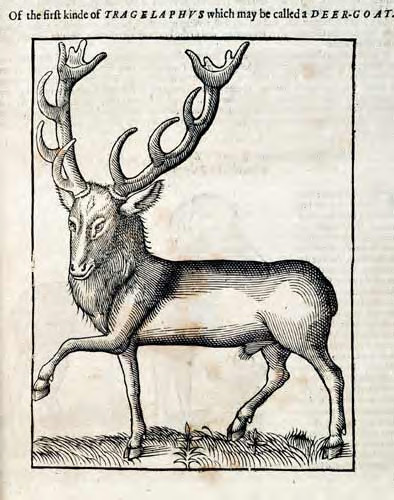
The tragelaphus or deer-goat

A deer-like animal described by Julius Caesar in his Commentarii de Bello Gallico (chapter 6.26) from the Hercynian Forest in the year 53 BC is most certainly to be interpreted as a reindeer:

There is an ox shaped like a stag. In the middle of its forehead a single horn grows between its ears, taller and straighter than the animal horns with which we are familiar. At the top this horn spreads out like the palm of a hand or the branches of a tree. The females are of the same form as the males, and their horns are the same shape and size.

According to Olaus Magnus's Historia de Gentibus Septentrionalibus – printed in Rome in the year 1555 – Gustav I of Sweden sent 10 reindeer to Albert, Duke of Prussia, in the year 1533. It may be these animals that Conrad Gessner had seen or heard of.

During World War II, the Soviet Army used reindeer as pack animals to transport food, ammunition and post from Murmansk to the Karelian Front and bring wounded soldiers, pilots and equipment back to the base. About 6,000 reindeer and more than 1,000 reindeer herders were part of the operation. Most herders were Nenets, who were mobilised from the Nenets Autonomous Okrug, but reindeer herders from the Murmansk, Arkhangelsk and Komi regions also participated.

In the FIS Alpine Ski World Cup event held in Levi, Finland each year, the winner of the women's slalom event is awarded a reindeer. The prize is largely symbolic, as all the reindeer awarded continue living in on a farm in Finland.

=== Santa Claus ===
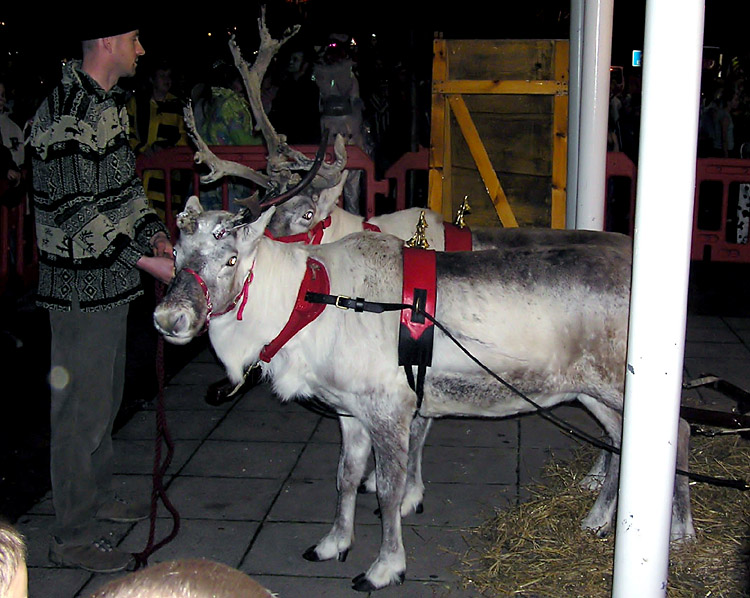
Relaxing after pulling Santa's sleigh at the switching on of Christmas lights in Scotland

Around the world, public interest in reindeer peaks during the Christmas season. According to Western folklore, Santa Claus's sleigh is pulled by flying reindeer. These reindeer were first named in the 1823 poem "A Visit from St. Nicholas", though the story originates earlier.

=== Mythology and art ===
Among the Inuit, there is a story of the origin of the caribou:

Once upon a time there were no caribou on the earth. But there was a man who wished for caribou, and he cut a hole deep in the ground, and up this hole came caribou, many caribou. The caribou came pouring out, until the earth was almost covered with them. And when the man thought there were caribou enough for mankind, he closed up the hole again. Thus the caribou came up on earth.

Inuit artists from the Barrenlands incorporate depictions of caribou—and items made from caribou antlers and skin—in carvings, drawings, prints and sculpture.

Contemporary Canadian artist Brian Jungen, of Dane-zaa First Nations ancestry, commissioned an installation entitled "The ghosts on top of my head" (2010–11) in Banff, Alberta, which depicts the antlers of caribou, elk and moose.

I remember a story my Uncle Jack told me – a Dunne-Za creation story about how animals once ruled the earth and were ten times their size and that got me thinking about scale and using the idea of the antler, which is a thing that everyone is scared of, and making it into something more approachable and abstract.

— Brian Jungen, 2011

Tomson Highway, CM is a Canadian and Cree playwright, novelist, and children's author, who was born in a remote area north of Brochet, Manitoba. His father, Joe Highway, was a caribou hunter. His 2001 children's book titled Caribou Song/atíhko níkamon was selected as one of the "Top 10 Children's Books" by the Canadian newspaper The Globe and Mail. The young protagonists of Caribou Song, like Tomson himself, followed the caribou herd with their families.

=== Heraldry and symbols ===
Several Norwegian municipalities have one or more reindeer depicted in their coats-of-arms: Eidfjord Municipality, Porsanger Municipality, Rendalen Municipality, Tromsø Municipality, Vadsø Municipality, and Vågå Municipality. The historic province of Västerbotten in Sweden has a reindeer in its coat of arms. The present Västerbotten County has very different borders and uses the reindeer combined with other symbols in its coat-of-arms. The city of Piteå also has a reindeer. The logo for Umeå University features three reindeer.

The Canadian 25-cent coin or "quarter" features a depiction of a caribou on one face. The caribou is the official provincial animal of Newfoundland and Labrador, Canada, and appears on the coat of arms of Nunavut. A caribou statue was erected at the centre of the Beaumont-Hamel Newfoundland Memorial, marking the spot in France where hundreds of soldiers from Newfoundland were killed and wounded in World War I. There is a replica in Bowring Park in St. John's, Newfoundland's capital city.

Two municipalities in Finland have reindeer motifs in their coats-of-arms: Kuusamo has a running reindeer; and Inari has a fish with reindeer antlers.

Coat of arms of Kuusamo

Coat of arms of Inari

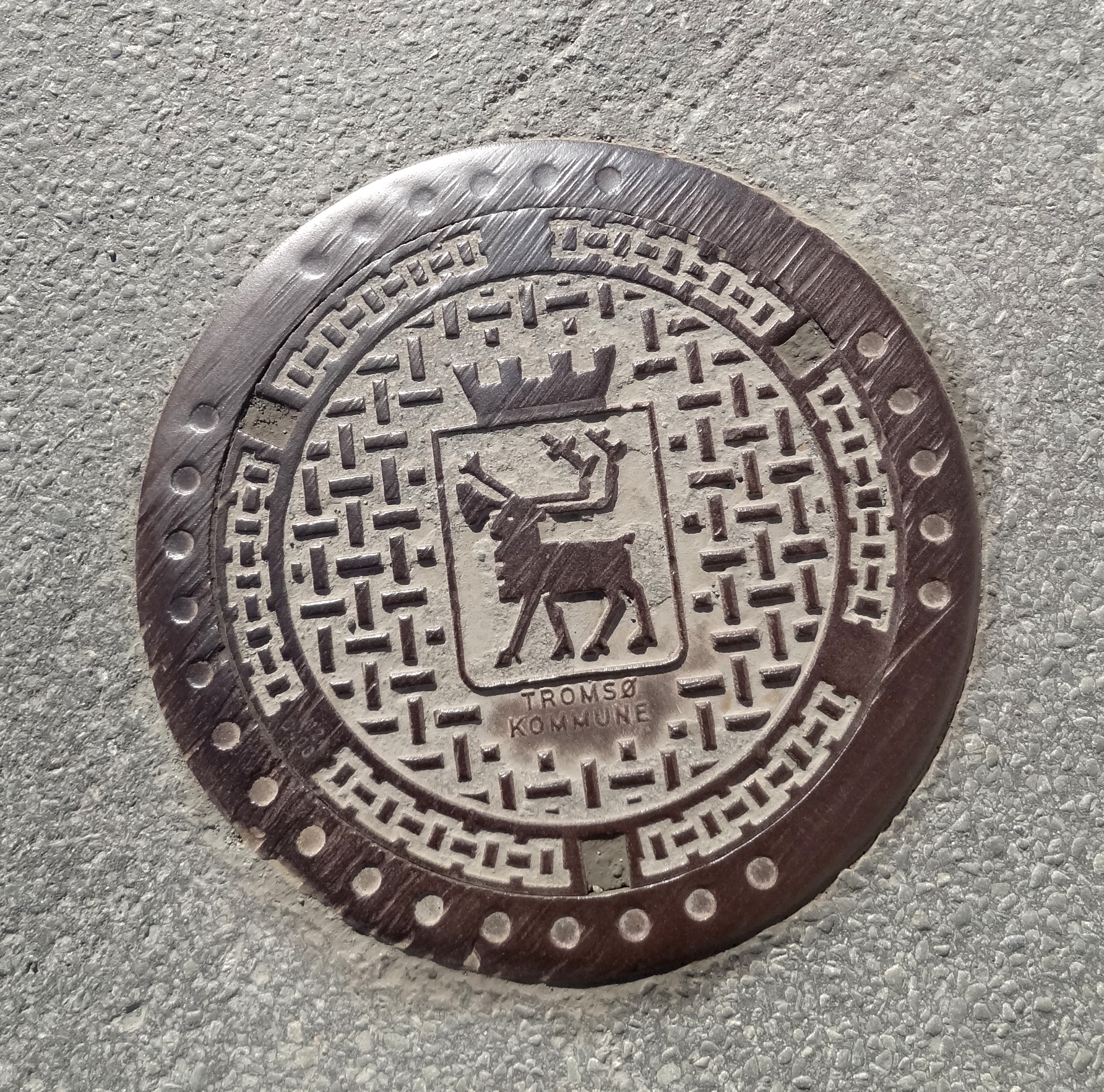
Coat of arms of Tromsø in the centre of a manhole cover

== See also ==
- Alaska Reindeer Service – Government training system, created 1893
- Caribou herds and populations in Canada
- Rangifer (constellation) – Former constellation
- Rangifer (journal)
- Reindeer Police – Special branch of the Norwegian Police Service

== Bibliography ==
- "Designatable Units for Caribou (Rangifer tarandus) in Canada" (PDF). COSEWIC. Ottawa, Ontario: Committee on the Status of Endangered Wildlife in Canada. 2011. Archived from the original (PDF) on 3 March 2016.
