= Dolphin-Union caribou =

Dolphin and Union Caribou herd

Conservation status
- Endangered (COSEWIC)

Scientific classification
- Kingdom: Animalia
- Phylum: Chordata
- Class: Mammalia
- Order: Artiodactyla
- Family: Cervidae
- Subfamily: Capreolinae
- Genus: Rangifer
- Species: R. tarandus
- Subspecies: R. t. groenlandicus
- Population: Dolphin-Union caribou
- Approximate range of caribou. Dolphin and Union population occupy area 5 and parts of area 4. Overlap with other subspecies of caribou is possible for contiguous range. 1. Rangifer tarandus caribou subdivided into ecotypes: woodland (boreal), woodland (migratory), woodland (montane), 2.R. t. dawsoni extinct 1907, 3. R. t. groenlandicus, 4. Barren-ground caribou R. t. groenlandicus, 5. R. t. groenlandicus 6. Peary caribou R. t. pearyi

Migratory population of caribou

Dolphin and Union Caribou, Dolphin and Union caribou herd, Dolphin-Union, locally known as Island Caribou, are a migratory population of barren-ground caribou, Rangifer tarandus groenlandicus, that occupy Victoria Island in the Canadian Arctic Archipelago and the nearby mainland. They are endemic to Canada. They migrate across the Dolphin and Union Strait from their summer grazing on Victoria Island to their winter grazing area on the Nunavut-Northwest Territories mainland in Canada. It is unusual for North American caribou to seasonally cross sea ice and the only other caribou to do so are the Peary caribou who are smaller in size and population. They were listed as Endangered by Committee on the Status of Endangered Wildlife in Canada (COSEWIC) since November 2017.

== Morphology ==
=== Pelage ===
The pelage of the Dolphin and Union Caribou is white in winter and slate-grey with white legs and under-parts in summer like the Peary caribou. The Dolphin and Union Caribou are slightly darker.

=== Antlers ===
Dolphin and Union Caribou have the characteristic light slate-grey antler velvet of Peary caribou as opposed to the dark chocolate brown antler velvet of other barren-ground caribou and woodland caribou.

== Taxonomy ==
Rudolph M. Anderson (1913) first described the migration of caribou across the Dolphin and Union Strait and briefly described its cranial and skeletal differences from other barren-ground caribou: crania "much shorter than those of the Great Bear Lake Caribou, with a noticeable fullness or convexity between forehead and nose..." Anderson had seen specimens of Peary caribou, described in 1902 by his colleague Joel Asaph Allen at the American Museum of Natural History, where they had both worked, and he knew these were not those. Morphological differences were later confirmed quantitatively by Thomas and Everson (1982). It was long thought to be either a race of Peary caribou or a hybrid or intergrade between Peary and barren-ground caribou (e.g., Manning 1960), for which reason some authorities called it (informally, since it was never officially described according to the rules of the International Commission on Zoological Nomenclature) Rangifer tarandus groenlandicus x pearyi. Finally in 2003, in preparation for the 2004 COSEWIC reassessment of Peary Caribou, a workshop was convened with Canada's top caribou geneticists. Genetic and other data showed it unequivocally to be a distinct race of barren-ground caribou, then known as Rangifer tarandus groenlandicus. Further research confirmed this identity. Its unique morphology, behavior and ecology and its genetic distance from other herds of barren-ground caribou, suggest that it may warrant subspecific designation, but it has yet to be formally described.

A population of Peary caribou on Banks Island, across a narrow strait from Victoria Island to the northwest, was found to have some individuals that are hybrids of Peary caribou and Barren-ground caribou and are properly referred to as Rangifer tarandus pearyi x groenlandicus under the old taxonomy. or R. arcticus pearyi x arcticus under the recent revision. See Reindeer: Taxonomy for more information.

== Population ==
"About 27,000 Dolphin-Union Caribou occupy areas in Nunavut and the NWT. These caribou were at very low densities during the mid-20th century and only started recovering about 30 years ago. The main distribution during the calving and fall seasons is on Victoria Island and since the 1960s Dolphin-Union Caribou resumed their migration to winter on the Nunavut-NWT mainland. The population is considered stable at best, or slightly declining." It declined from 18,413 caribou in 2015 to 4,105 in 2018 and 3,815 in 2020; however, the confidence intervals were wide enough that the 2018 and 2020 estimates were not statistically different.

== Conservation ==
In 2004 COSEWIC listed the Dolphin and Union Caribou population as Special Concern. (Note: "The original designation considered a single unit that included Peary caribou, Rangifer tarandus pearyi, and what is now known as the Dolphin and Union population of the barren-ground caribou, Rangifer tarandus groenlandicus. It was assigned a status of Threatened in April 1979. Split to allow designation of three separate populations in 1991: Banks Island (Endangered), High Arctic (Endangered) and Low Arctic (Threatened) populations. In May 2004 all three population designations were de-activated, and the Peary Caribou, Rangifer tarandus pearyi, was assessed separately from the Barren-ground Caribou (Dolphin and Union population), Rangifer tarandus groenlandicus. The subspecies pearyi is composed of a portion of the former "Low Arctic population" and all of the former "High Arctic" and "Banks Island" populations, and it was designated Endangered in May 2004. Last assessment based on an update status report (COSEWIC 2004:iii).") In 2017, COSEWIC upgraded the status to Endangered. In NWT, Dolphin and Union caribou are listed as Special Concern under the NWT Species at Risk (NWT) Act (2013).

== Co-management ==
Dolphin and Union caribou are co-managed in Nunavut according to the Nunavut Land Claims Agreement, and are com-managed in the Northwest Territories according to the Inuvialuit Final Agreement. These agreements confer primary wildlife management authority on the respective management boards: the Nunavut Wildlife Management Board and, in the NWT, the Wildlife Management Advisory Council and the Inuvialuit Game Council. Local Hunters and Trappers Associations are integrally involved in management.

== Habitat ==
In summer the herd occupies Victoria Island where it is often on "beach ridges and river valley slopes." While normally they winter in the Bathurst Inlet area of Nunavut, the herd has migrated as far as Tuktut Nogait National Park in the west, following the shoreline in search of windswept areas where the snow cover is cleared making it easier for them to graze.

== Potential threats to survival of the Dolphin-Union Caribou ==
There are a number of concerns including potential over-harvesting by hunting, "over-grazing in areas where caribou wait before migrating to the mainland for the winter"; "local knowledge has demonstrated an increase of predators across summer ranges"; "an unknown number of caribou die every fall breaking through the ice crossing to the mainland"; "changes to sea ice freeze-up and break-up due to climate change could threaten migration; and "Increased ship traffic through Dolphin and Union Strait may affect ice formation and caribou migration."

== Dolphin-Union Caribou wildlife photographers ==
- Martin Dumond
- Frank L. Miller

== Dolphin-Union Caribou research ==
- Frank L. Miller
- Government of the Northwest Territories
  - Department of Environment and Natural Resources, Yellowknife, Northwest Territories
    - Anne Gunn 1979, 2010
- Aurora Wildlife Research, Nelson, British Columbia
  - Kim G. Poole 2010
- Nunavut Wildlife Division, Department of Environment, Kugluktuk, Nunavut
  - Brent R. Patterson 2010
  - Mathieu Dumond 2010
- Ontario Ministry of Natural Resources, Wildlife Research and Development Section, Trent University, DNA Building, Peterborough, Ontario
- The Arctic Institute of North America
  - T. H. Manning. 1960. "The relationship of the Peary caribou and barren-ground caribou." Technical Paper No. 4. Montreal: Arctic Institute of North America

== See also ==
- Caribou herds and populations in Canada
