= Kuunajuk =

- Mouth of the Kuunajuk

Location
- Country: Canada
- Territory: Nunavut

Physical characteristics
- Source
  - location: Between Beechey Lake and Pelly Lake, Kitikmeot Region, Nunavut, Canada
  - elevation: 3 m (9.8 ft)
- Mouth
  - location: Queen Maud Gulf
  - coordinates: 68°02′57″N 103°59′24″W
- Length: 287 km (178 mi)
- Basin size: 16,900 km^{2} (6,500 sq mi)

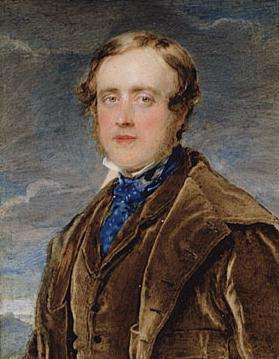
Edward Ellice, Jr.

Kuunajuk formerly Ellice River, for Edward Ellice, Jr., is a waterway in the Kitikmeot Region of Nunavut, Canada. It rises close to the Back River between Lake Beechey and Pelly Lake, and flows northward into the Queen Maud Gulf. Its mouth opens between Campbell Bay and Gernon Bay. The land between the river and Sherman Inlet is generally flat and marshy. Muskox and barren-ground caribou frequent the area.

== Fauna ==
The river is home to Arctic char. Large populations of the American brant goose nest on coastal islands at the river's mouth.

== See also ==
- List of rivers of Nunavut
