= Gernon Bay =

Bay in Nunavut, Canada

- Location within Nunavut
- Location: Queen Maud Gulf
- Coordinates: 68°01′N 103°15′W
- River sources: Ellice River
- Ocean/sea sources: Arctic Ocean
- Basin countries: Canada
- Settlements: Uninhabited

Gernon Bay is an Arctic waterway in the Kitikmeot Region, Nunavut, Canada. It is located on the south side of the Queen Maud Gulf off Nunavut's mainland.

Campbell Bay and Chester Bay are nearby.

The mouth of Kuunajuk, formerly Ellice River, opens between Gernon Bay and Campbell Bay.
