= Heli hiking =

Hiking done with helicopter access

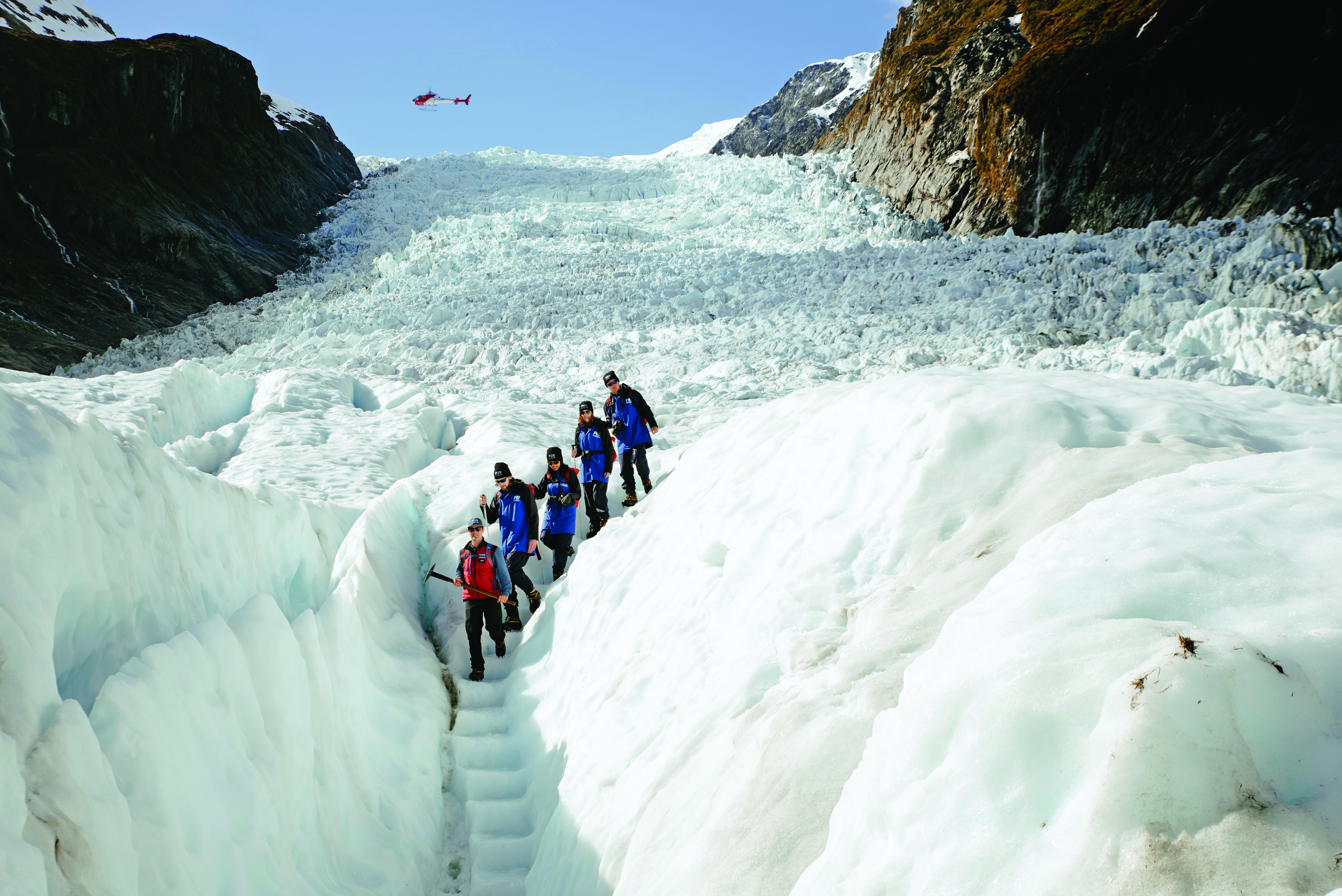
A tour group hiking over Victoria Flat, Fox Glacier, after being dropped off by helicopter.

Heli hiking is a recreational activity in which a helicopter is used to access remote areas of the back country for hiking. These locations are typically inaccessible through other forms of transportation. Along with heli skiing, heli hiking is one of the most popular forms of heli tourism. It falls within the broad category of amateur adventure or activity-based tourism. It is a seasonal commercial backcountry industry, which also includes mountaineering and kayaking.

Heli hiking is a form of mountain recreation in the mountainous regions of New Zealand and the Bugaboos in Canada. It is a form of glacier tourism in locations including Glacier Bay National Park, Westland Tai Poutini National Park, and Ilulissat Icefjord.

== History ==
The first heli hiking tour took place in the summer of 1978 at the Cariboo Lodge, operated by Canadian Mountain Holidays. It was introduced as, and continues to be, the summer counterpart to heli skiing.

== Marketing ==
Heli hiking has been marketed toward women. It is popular among young female tourists in New Zealand.

The activity is advertised as a luxury tourist attraction.

== Environmental impact and regulation ==
Due to the disturbances caused by helicopter overflights, heli hiking is considered by authorities to be a possible cause of the decline of the mountain goat population in southeastern British Columbia and is opposed by the East Kootenay Environmental Society. It has also impacted British Columbia's Graham caribou population through displacement and interruption of migratory cycles.

In the North Cascades, heli hiking has been discouraged by the United States Forest Service. However, there is still minimal regulation of heli hiking and other mountain recreation activities for environmental protection.
