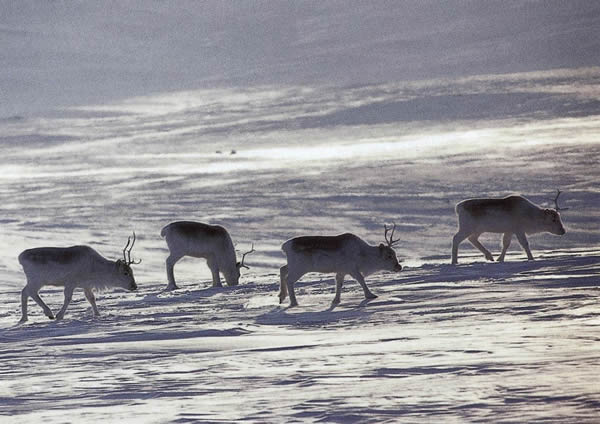
- Peary caribou

Conservation status
- Endangered (IUCN 3.1)

- Imperiled (NatureServe)

Scientific classification
- Kingdom: Animalia
- Phylum: Chordata
- Class: Mammalia
- Order: Artiodactyla
- Family: Cervidae
- Subfamily: Capreolinae
- Genus: Rangifer
- Species: R. arcticus
- Subspecies: R. a. pearyi

Trinomial name
- Rangifer arcticus pearyi (Allen, 1902)
- Approximate range of Peary caribou in light pink. Overlap with other subspecies of caribou is possible for contiguous range. 1. Rangifer caribou caribou, which is subdivided into ecotypes: woodland (boreal), woodland (migratory) and Arctic (montane), 2. R. a. dawsoni (extinct 1908), 3. R. a. arcticus, 4. R. a. arcticus, 5. R. a. arcticus, 6. R. a. pearyi

= Peary caribou =

Subspecies of deer

The Peary caribou (Rangifer arcticus pearyi) is a subspecies of caribou found in the Canadian high Arctic islands of Nunavut and the Northwest Territories in Canada. They are the smallest of the North American caribou, with the females weighing an average of 60 kg (130 lb) and the males 110 kg (240 lb). In length the females average 1.4 m (4 ft 7 in) and the males 1.7 m (5 ft 7 in).

Like other caribou, both the males and females have antlers. The males grow their antlers from March to August and the females from June to September, and in both cases the velvet is gone by October. The coat of the caribou is white and thick in the winter. In the summer it becomes short and darker, almost slate-grey in color. The coat is made up of hollow hair which helps to trap warmer air and insulate the caribou.

The males become sexually mature after two years and the females after three years. Breeding is in the fall and depends on the female having built up sufficient fat reserves. The gestation period last for seven to eight months and one calf is produced.

Peary caribou feed on most of the available grasses, Cyperaceae (sedges), lichen and mushrooms. In particular they seem to enjoy the purple saxifrage and in summer their muzzles become purple from the plants. Their hooves are sharp and shaped like a shovel to enable them to dig through the snow in search of food.

The caribou rarely travel more than 150 km (93 mi) from their winter feeding grounds to the summer ones. They are able to outrun the Arctic wolf, their main predator, and are good swimmers. They usually travel in small groups of no more than twelve in the summer and four in the winter.

The Peary caribou population has dropped from above 40,000 in 1961 to an estimated 13,000 adults in 2016, according to the Committee on the Status of Endangered Wildlife in Canada (COSEWIC). During this period, the number of days with above freezing temperatures has increased significantly, resulting in ice layers in the snow pack. These ice layers hinder foraging and are the likely cause for dramatic drops in caribou population in the future.

The Peary caribou, called tuktu in Inuinnaqtun/Inuktitut, and written as ᕐᑯᑦᓯᑦᑐᒥ ᑐᒃᑐ in Inuktitut syllabics, is a major food source for the Inuit and was named after the American explorer Robert Peary.

== Morphology ==
=== Pelage ===
During the winter, the fur of the Peary caribou becomes thicker and whiter. In the summer it is shorter and darker. The pelage of the Peary caribou is white in winter and slate-grey with white legs and underparts in summer like the barren-ground caribou in the Dolphin-Union caribou herd. The Dolphin-Union caribou are slightly darker.

Like all caribou they have hollow hairs that help trap warm air and insulate their bodies.

== Antlers ==
The Peary caribou and the Dolphin-Union caribou herd both have light slate-grey antler velvet. The antler velvet of the barren-ground caribou and the boreal woodland caribou are both dark chocolate brown.

== Habitat ==
The Peary caribou may move seasonally up to 150 km (93 mi) each way, not necessarily on fixed migration routes that are used habitually, but rather broad migration zones that individuals use to travel from winter ranges to calving areas and summer ranges. They occupy High Arctic islands, including Banks Island, the northwest corner of Victoria Island, Prince of Wales Island, Somerset Island and the Queen Elizabeth Islands. In summer they search for the richest vegetation which is found "on the upper slopes of river valleys and uplands." In the winter, they "inhabit areas where the snow is not too deep such as rugged uplands, beach ridges and rocky outcrops."

Aulavik National Park at the northern end of Banks Island is also home to the Peary caribou. The Thomsen River runs through the park and is the northernmost navigable river (by canoe) in North America. Aulavik National Park, a fly-in park, protects about 12,274 km^{2} (4,739 sq mi) of Arctic lowlands at the northern end of the island. In Inuvialuktun Aulavik means "place where people travel" and caribou have been hunted there for more than 3,400 years, from Pre-Dorset cultures to contemporary Inuvialuit.

=== In Greenland ===
Archaeologists have found bones of pearyi-sized caribou that occupied Greenland in the Illinoian-Wisconsin interglacial and through the LGM and early Holocene (Meldgaard 1986). Degerbøl (1957) described R. t. eogroenlandicus (East Greenland caribou), a small caribou subspecies that became extinct around 1900, from a relict enclave in north-eastern Greenland (Fig. 2). However, Anderson (1946) thought that any caribou that were to potentially be found in far northwestern Greenland, specifically north of the Kane Basin encompassing Washington Land, Hall Land, Nyeboe Land and Warming Land, were Peary caribou and implied the same for east Greenland caribou. Banfield (1961) stated that this was definitely so, and suggested that the caribou south of Kane Basin, around Inglefield Bay, were intergrades between R. t. pearyi and R. t. groenlandicus, but Roby et al. (1984) concluded the caribou around Inglefield Bay were environmentally stunted groenlandicus. Bennike (1988), comparing bones and noting that Peary caribou have been documented crossing Nares Strait to Greenland, doubted that pearyi and eogroenlandicus were subspecifically distinct. That Peary caribou shared certain mtDNA haplotypes and morphological similarities with it (Kvie et al. 2016) casts further doubt on the validity of R. t. eogroenlandicus. Inuit Qaujimajatuqangit (traditional or community knowledge) records that Peary caribou do, occasionally, cross to Greenland. In any case, the last live caribou reported from northern Greenland were most likely Peary caribou that had strayed from Ellesmere Island. They were last seen in Hall Land in 1922. In Inglefield Land, northwest Greenland, stray Peary caribou from Ellesmere Island may potentially mix with barren-ground caribou by crossing the winter ice bridge at the northern end of Smith Sound, but currently no evidence of genetic mixing in the Inglefield Land population exists.

== Conservation ==
It was assigned a status of threatened in April 1979. In May 2004 the Committee on the Status of Endangered Wildlife in Canada (COSEWIC) listed the Peary caribou as endangered. In 2015, COSEWIC returned the status to threatened, noting:

"This subspecies of caribou is endemic to the Canadian Arctic Archipelago, living on the edge of plant growth in polar desert and arctic tundra environments. The current population is estimated at 13,200 mature individuals. From a population high of 22,000 in 1987, the species experienced a catastrophic die-off in the mid-1990s related to severe icing events in some parts of its range. The population was ca. 5,400 mature individuals in 1996, the lowest since surveys first commenced in 1961. Of four subpopulations, two are currently showing an increasing trend, one is stable, and the fourth had fewer than 10 individuals at the last count in 2005, with no evidence of any recovery. The overall population has experienced an estimated three-generation decline of 35%, but has been increasing over the past two decades. The highest-impact threats derive from a changing climate, including increased intensity and frequency of rain-on-snow events negatively affecting forage accessibility in winter, and decreased extent and thickness of sea ice causing shifts in migration and movement patterns"

— COSEWIC (Committee on the Status of Endangered Wildlife in Canada), COSEWIC assessment and status report on the Peary Caribou Rangifer tarandus pearyi in Canada, 2015:iii

== Taxonomy ==
Originally named Rangifer pearyi Allen, 1902, it was made a subspecies of barren-ground caribou in 1960 as R. arcticus pearyi. When all caribou and reindeer in the world were made conspecific, the name became R. tarandus pearyi. A recent revision returned the name to R. arcticus pearyi.

== See also ==
- Caribou herds and populations in Canada
