= Forest Landscape Integrity Index =

Global index of forest condition

The Forest Landscape Integrity Index (FLII) is a global, map-based indicator of forest condition that estimates the degree of anthropogenic modification of forest ecosystems. Developed by an international research team led by the Wildlife Conservation Society, the index integrates spatial data on observed and inferred human pressures and loss of forest connectivity to produce a continuous score from 0 (most modified) to 10 (least modified) for each ~300 m forest pixel.

In the study's global map for early 2019, 40.5% of forest area (about 17.4 million km^{2}) was classified as high integrity (FLII ≥ 9.6), 33.9% (14.6 million km^{2}) as medium integrity and 25.6% (11 million km^{2}) as low integrity (FLII ≤ 6.0). High-integrity forests were concentrated in boreal regions of Russia and Canada and in large tropical forest blocks such as the Amazon, Central Africa and New Guinea.

FLII has been used in forest-condition monitoring and referenced in policy and research contexts, including discussions of ecosystem integrity indicators under the Kunming-Montreal Global Biodiversity Framework.

== Forest integrity ==
In ecology, ecological integrity (sometimes ecosystem integrity) refers to the extent to which an ecosystem's structure, species composition and ecological processes fall within their natural range of variation. In forests, integrity is often discussed alongside, but distinct from, deforestation (area loss) and forest degradation (declines in condition or function without complete land-cover conversion).

The FLII operationalizes forest integrity as the inverse of cumulative human modification at the landscape scale, combining mapped pressures, modeled indirect effects and changes in connectivity to generate a globally consistent, continuous integrity score.

== Methodology ==
Grantham et al. calculated FLII by integrating four main spatial inputs—forest extent, observed pressures, inferred pressures and loss of forest connectivity—with processing carried out in Google Earth Engine.

=== Forest extent and temporal baseline ===
The forest extent layer was designed to represent forest at the start of 2019. Forest was defined as woody vegetation taller than 5 m with at least 20% canopy cover. To map extent, the authors used global tree-cover estimates for 2000 and subtracted mapped tree-cover loss from 2001–2018 (excluding temporary canopy loss).

=== Observed and inferred pressures ===
Observed pressures represent human activities that can be mapped directly at global scale (e.g. built infrastructure, agriculture and recent deforestation). Inferred pressures represent additional impacts that tend to occur around observed pressures but are harder to map directly (e.g. access-related extraction such as selective logging, fuelwood collection and hunting), modeled as a decay function of proximity to observed pressure sources and access networks.

=== Connectivity loss ===
The connectivity component estimates reductions in forest connectivity caused by forest loss and fragmentation, capturing the influence of surrounding forest cover on a given pixel's integrity.

=== Scores and classes ===
The continuous FLII ranges from 0 to 10. For communication and reporting, the authors also provided an illustrative three-class map: low (≤6.0), medium (>6.0 and <9.6) and high (≥9.6), with thresholds benchmarked against reference locations of known ecological integrity. The study noted the approach could be updated as new global datasets become available, including potentially on an annual basis.

== Global results ==
In the 2019 map, the authors estimated that 91.2% of the world's remaining forests were affected by some degree of human pressure, and 31.2% experienced observed pressures. They reported a global mean FLII score of 7.76; 18 countries had mean scores greater than 9, and no biome or biogeographic realm contained more than half of its forest area in the high-integrity class.

High-integrity forests were disproportionately concentrated in a small number of countries (with Russia and Canada together containing about half of the global high-integrity forest area). Only about 27% of high-integrity forest area fell within nationally designated protected areas, while 56% of forests within protected areas were classed as high integrity.

== Country rankings ==
172 countries have been ranked:

Forest Landscape Integrity 2019
| Country | Mean FLII | Low integrity (km^{2}) | Medium integrity (km^{2}) | High integrity (km^{2}) | Total forest area (km^{2}) | Map |
|---|---|---|---|---|---|---|
| Seychelles | 10 | 0 | 0 | 68 | 68 | |
| Sudan | 9.8 | 1 | 72 | 495 | 569 | |
| Guyana | 9.58 | 4,162 | 40,817 | 147,413 | 192,391 | |
| South Sudan | 9.45 | 5,083 | 59,389 | 146,218 | 210,691 | |
| Suriname | 9.39 | 6,796 | 25,031 | 107,954 | 139,781 | |
| Mongolia | 9.36 | 520 | 11,915 | 27,407 | 39,841 | |
| Central African Republic | 9.28 | 30,161 | 139,350 | 379,097 | 548,608 | |
| Botswana | 9.13 | 13 | 187 | 372 | 572 | |
| Gabon | 9.07 | 11,780 | 118,348 | 120,852 | 250,979 | |
| Russia | 9.02 | 739,484 | 2,245,281 | 5,137,079 | 8,121,843 | |
| Canada | 8.99 | 480,206 | 1,027,386 | 2,968,268 | 4,475,860 | |
| Congo | 8.89 | 24,512 | 124,215 | 158,184 | 306,911 | |
| Kyrgyzstan | 8.86 | 329 | 2,819 | 2,761 | 5,909 | |
| Peru | 8.86 | 85,793 | 190,547 | 509,720 | 786,061 | |
| Afghanistan | 8.85 | 90 | 1,475 | 977 | 2,542 | |
| Bhutan | 8.85 | 1,620 | 16,769 | 10,140 | 28,529 | |
| Papua New Guinea | 8.84 | 37,294 | 183,415 | 216,355 | 437,064 | |
| Vanuatu | 8.82 | 734 | 5,322 | 4,448 | 10,504 | |
| Venezuela | 8.78 | 64,650 | 170,792 | 351,112 | 586,554 | |
| Tajikistan | 8.65 | 34 | 137 | 130 | 301 | |
| Bolivia | 8.47 | 78,745 | 280,532 | 272,007 | 631,284 | |
| Namibia | 8.43 | 5 | 13 | 17 | 36 | |
| Angola | 8.35 | 105,487 | 284,054 | 315,895 | 705,436 | |
| Fiji | 8.35 | 1,753 | 10,802 | 3,594 | 16,148 | |
| Colombia | 8.26 | 150,737 | 272,442 | 428,320 | 851,499 | |
| Kazakhstan | 8.23 | 6,068 | 18,926 | 15,294 | 40,288 | |
| Palau | 8.09 | 45 | 333 | 9 | 387 | |
| North Korea | 8.02 | 8,374 | 40,156 | 8,410 | 56,939 | |
| Cameroon | 8 | 66,191 | 181,336 | 119,263 | 366,789 | |
| Equatorial Guinea | 7.99 | 3,982 | 17,595 | 5,007 | 26,585 | |
| Georgia | 7.79 | 6,982 | 17,803 | 9,784 | 34,570 | |
| Brunei Darussalam | 7.71 | 1,102 | 2,842 | 1,498 | 5,442 | |
| Comoros | 7.69 | 284 | 1,149 | 82 | 1,515 | |
| Iran | 7.67 | 3,361 | 12,930 | 2,162 | 18,453 | |
| Ecuador | 7.66 | 48,822 | 77,585 | 73,492 | 199,900 | |
| DRC | 7.56 | 533,118 | 935,508 | 727,983 | 2,196,608 | |
| Micronesia | 7.55 | 8 | 35 | 0 | 43 | |
| Brazil | 7.52 | 1,374,902 | 1,354,961 | 2,338,101 | 5,067,963 | |
| Zambia | 7.5 | 96,969 | 164,376 | 110,822 | 372,167 | |
| North Macedonia | 7.42 | 2,034 | 7,090 | 459 | 9,583 | |
| Pakistan | 7.42 | 2,090 | 7,859 | 1,139 | 11,088 | |
| Lesotho | 7.4 | 1 | 4 | 0 | 5 | |
| Chile | 7.37 | 56,849 | 41,971 | 93,537 | 192,357 | |
| Bahamas | 7.35 | 741 | 1,935 | 399 | 3,075 | |
| Nepal | 7.23 | 13,785 | 41,992 | 3,760 | 59,538 | |
| Australia | 7.22 | 117,672 | 239,624 | 103,852 | 461,148 | |
| Argentina | 7.21 | 98,249 | 189,966 | 72,557 | 360,772 | |
| Solomon Islands | 7.19 | 6,871 | 15,310 | 3,149 | 25,329 | |
| Myanmar | 7.18 | 129,745 | 220,188 | 96,924 | 446,857 | |
| Ethiopia | 7.16 | 52,652 | 84,430 | 44,397 | 181,479 | |
| Mali | 7.16 | 451 | 996 | 140 | 1,586 | |
| Somalia | 7.16 | 347 | 1,384 | 46 | 1,777 | |
| China | 7.14 | 533,800 | 974,431 | 301,051 | 1,809,282 | |
| Tanzania | 7.13 | 123,997 | 159,712 | 122,812 | 406,521 | |
| New Zealand | 7.12 | 34,503 | 44,155 | 35,334 | 113,992 | |
| Senegal | 7.11 | 847 | 2,456 | 162 | 3,465 | |
| Timor-Leste | 7.11 | 1,783 | 7,008 | 47 | 8,838 | |
| India | 7.09 | 117,992 | 254,792 | 54,428 | 427,211 | |
| Cyprus | 7.06 | 388 | 1,026 | 18 | 1,432 | |
| Norway | 6.98 | 39,343 | 67,383 | 16,627 | 123,352 | |
| Saint Vincent and the Grenadines | 6.95 | 91 | 221 | 0 | 312 | |
| Mozambique | 6.93 | 150,665 | 189,362 | 115,379 | 455,406 | |
| Mexico | 6.82 | 193,908 | 280,445 | 121,842 | 596,195 | |
| Albania | 6.77 | 2,426 | 5,256 | 122 | 7,805 | |
| Uzbekistan | 6.77 | 214 | 227 | 199 | 640 | |
| Morocco | 6.74 | 2,260 | 4,076 | 451 | 6,787 | |
| United States | 6.65 | 1,328,079 | 1,144,693 | 658,645 | 3,131,417 | |
| Sao Tome and Principe | 6.64 | 31 | 140 | 0 | 171 | |
| Trinidad and Tobago | 6.62 | 1,478 | 2,176 | 418 | 4,072 | |
| Greece | 6.6 | 14,548 | 27,833 | 1,078 | 43,459 | |
| Indonesia | 6.6 | 535,370 | 509,018 | 431,973 | 1,476,361 | |
| Azerbaijan | 6.55 | 4,820 | 7,189 | 1,534 | 13,543 | |
| Montenegro | 6.41 | 2,949 | 4,778 | 82 | 7,809 | |
| Paraguay | 6.39 | 78,538 | 102,626 | 29,877 | 211,041 | |
| Turkey | 6.39 | 43,043 | 68,243 | 3,516 | 114,801 | |
| Taiwan | 6.38 | 8,786 | 14,547 | 1,453 | 24,786 | |
| Cabo Verde | 6.37 | 27 | 38 | 0 | 65 | |
| Panama | 6.37 | 25,420 | 21,310 | 14,605 | 61,336 | |
| Cambodia | 6.31 | 30,143 | 31,939 | 16,349 | 78,431 | |
| Turkmenistan | 6.31 | 5 | 33 | 0 | 37 | |
| Zimbabwe | 6.31 | 9,450 | 14,417 | 1,644 | 25,511 | |
| Nigeria | 6.2 | 64,621 | 65,355 | 24,307 | 154,283 | |
| Chad | 6.18 | 5,261 | 6,016 | 1,910 | 13,187 | |
| Saint Lucia | 6.17 | 235 | 316 | 0 | 551 | |
| Belize | 6.15 | 7,004 | 7,957 | 2,744 | 17,705 | |
| Bulgaria | 6.09 | 18,884 | 26,325 | 847 | 46,057 | |
| South Korea | 6.02 | 25,060 | 32,009 | 888 | 57,956 | |
| Thailand | 6 | 86,276 | 89,326 | 33,612 | 209,214 | |
| Bosnia and Herzegovina | 5.99 | 13,387 | 17,031 | 574 | 30,993 | |
| Romania | 5.95 | 38,395 | 48,394 | 607 | 87,395 | |
| Philippines | 5.91 | 91,820 | 100,831 | 8,393 | 201,044 | |
| Togo | 5.88 | 5,064 | 4,522 | 1,076 | 10,662 | |
| Benin | 5.86 | 4,724 | 3,698 | 1,769 | 10,191 | |
| Sri Lanka | 5.83 | 20,541 | 22,390 | 1,613 | 44,544 | |
| Japan | 5.8 | 135,783 | 133,480 | 16,005 | 285,268 | |
| Malawi | 5.74 | 12,514 | 12,167 | 2,396 | 27,078 | |
| Guinea-Bissau | 5.7 | 9,274 | 8,702 | 855 | 18,831 | |
| Laos | 5.59 | 92,986 | 80,564 | 19,252 | 192,801 | |
| Armenia | 5.46 | 1,894 | 1,681 | 3 | 3,577 | |
| Mauritius | 5.46 | 567 | 478 | 0 | 1,045 | |
| Bangladesh | 5.45 | 10,013 | 7,251 | 1,947 | 19,211 | |
| Cuba | 5.4 | 22,605 | 18,460 | 1,632 | 42,697 | |
| Sweden | 5.35 | 174,415 | 109,779 | 23,494 | 307,687 | |
| Vietnam | 5.35 | 82,551 | 75,353 | 9,588 | 167,492 | |
| Serbia | 5.29 | 17,513 | 14,112 | 516 | 32,141 | |
| Algeria | 5.22 | 7,418 | 6,044 | 81 | 13,543 | |
| Kosovo | 5.19 | 2,628 | 1,775 | 47 | 4,450 | |
| Tunisia | 5.14 | 1,354 | 987 | 0 | 2,340 | |
| Finland | 5.08 | 144,310 | 83,572 | 9,294 | 237,176 | |
| Jamaica | 5.01 | 5,362 | 3,249 | 158 | 8,770 | |
| Malaysia | 5.01 | 130,825 | 91,957 | 21,499 | 244,281 | |
| South Africa | 4.94 | 45,489 | 34,968 | 3,196 | 83,653 | |
| Croatia | 4.92 | 15,732 | 10,522 | 379 | 26,633 | |
| Guinea | 4.9 | 81,702 | 54,877 | 2,895 | 139,475 | |
| Libya | 4.85 | 15 | 2 | 0 | 17 | |
| Liberia | 4.79 | 51,975 | 31,162 | 11,025 | 94,163 | |
| Antigua and Barbuda | 4.72 | 114 | 92 | 0 | 206 | |
| Costa Rica | 4.65 | 27,164 | 12,838 | 4,164 | 44,167 | |
| Madagascar | 4.63 | 120,340 | 66,584 | 11,922 | 198,846 | |
| Gambia | 4.56 | 181 | 85 | 0 | 266 | |
| Saint Kitts and Nevis | 4.55 | 95 | 50 | 0 | 145 | |
| Ghana | 4.53 | 57,519 | 28,901 | 2,160 | 88,580 | |
| France | 4.52 | 161,987 | 49,496 | 74,121 | 285,604 | |
| Burundi | 4.5 | 6,882 | 3,841 | 46 | 10,769 | |
| Liechtenstein | 4.5 | 59 | 42 | 0 | 101 | |
| Honduras | 4.48 | 57,899 | 23,802 | 3,692 | 85,392 | |
| Andorra | 4.45 | 170 | 49 | 0 | 219 | |
| Uganda | 4.36 | 77,303 | 36,381 | 7,507 | 121,190 | |
| Slovakia | 4.34 | 17,615 | 8,165 | 0 | 25,781 | |
| Spain | 4.23 | 82,770 | 46,013 | 133 | 128,916 | |
| Grenada | 4.22 | 221 | 86 | 0 | 308 | |
| Eswatini | 4.21 | 5,054 | 2,501 | 14 | 7,569 | |
| Kenya | 4.2 | 28,427 | 13,558 | 4,702 | 46,686 | |
| Dominican Republic | 4.19 | 19,890 | 9,364 | 518 | 29,772 | |
| Israel | 4.14 | 170 | 85 | 0 | 255 | |
| El Salvador | 4.05 | 8,837 | 2,947 | 0 | 11,784 | |
| Haiti | 4.01 | 7,116 | 2,831 | 12 | 9,959 | |
| Guatemala | 3.85 | 58,572 | 18,764 | 5,592 | 82,928 | |
| Rwanda | 3.85 | 5,665 | 2,170 | 619 | 8,454 | |
| Slovenia | 3.78 | 11,065 | 3,791 | 0 | 14,856 | |
| Lebanon | 3.76 | 541 | 115 | 0 | 656 | |
| Italy | 3.65 | 79,403 | 26,858 | 25 | 106,286 | |
| Cote d'Ivoire | 3.64 | 158,010 | 41,005 | 7,288 | 206,303 | |
| Syria | 3.64 | 841 | 282 | 0 | 1,123 | |
| Belarus | 3.63 | 77,870 | 20,847 | 91 | 98,808 | |
| Nicaragua | 3.63 | 65,356 | 17,646 | 4,858 | 87,860 | |
| Uruguay | 3.61 | 11,793 | 3,998 | 0 | 15,791 | |
| Iraq | 3.59 | 104 | 9 | 0 | 113 | |
| Austria | 3.55 | 36,666 | 12,422 | 21 | 49,109 | |
| Switzerland | 3.53 | 13,636 | 4,412 | 10 | 18,058 | |
| Ukraine | 3.3 | 89,540 | 20,183 | 176 | 109,900 | |
| Estonia | 3.05 | 24,473 | 4,832 | 52 | 29,358 | |
| Jordan | 2.79 | 12 | 0 | 0 | 12 | |
| Sierra Leone | 2.76 | 52,512 | 11,858 | 640 | 65,010 | |
| Germany | 2.28 | 122,168 | 11,307 | 0 | 133,475 | |
| Hungary | 2.25 | 18,729 | 2,047 | 0 | 20,776 | |
| Poland | 2.24 | 101,886 | 7,103 | 0 | 108,989 | |
| Moldova | 2.2 | 3,113 | 202 | 0 | 3,315 | |
| Latvia | 2.09 | 38,164 | 2,137 | 0 | 40,301 | |
| Czechia | 1.71 | 32,161 | 1,611 | 0 | 33,772 | |
| United Kingdom | 1.65 | 29,149 | 2,917 | 35 | 32,101 | |
| Lithuania | 1.62 | 24,554 | 930 | 0 | 25,484 | |
| Belgium | 1.36 | 8,803 | 297 | 0 | 9,099 | |
| Luxembourg | 1.12 | 1,170 | 0 | 0 | 1,170 | |
| Singapore | 1.11 | 170 | 2 | 0 | 172 | |
| Dominica | 1.06 | 531 | 2 | 0 | 533 | |
| Ireland | 0.92 | 5,283 | 96 | 0 | 5,378 | |
| Portugal | 0.82 | 25,966 | 553 | 0 | 26,519 | |
| Netherlands | 0.6 | 5,250 | 72 | 0 | 5,322 | |
| Egypt | 0.56 | 4,772 | 218 | 69 | 5,059 | |
| Denmark | 0.5 | 5,756 | 31 | 0 | 5,787 | |
| San Marino | 0.01 | 7 | 0 | 0 | 7 | |

Countries with high mean FLII (8-10)
Countries with medium mean FLII (5-7.99)
Countries with low mean FLII (0-4.99)

== Use and applications ==
=== Policy and reporting ===
FLII has been referenced as a complementary indicator for monitoring ecological integrity, connectivity and ecosystem restoration under Target 2 of the Kunming-Montreal Global Biodiversity Framework. The World Resources Institute's Global Forest Review uses FLII as a measure of forest degradation in its synthesis of global forest change and condition.

The 2023 Forest Declaration Assessment includes "FLII units lost per year" as an indicator of forest degradation for tracking progress toward international forest goals.

The European Commission's Joint Research Centre has incorporated a Forest Landscape Integrity layer in its Global Forest Types 2020 map product and related "primary forest" outputs.

=== Research ===
Researchers have used FLII to compare forest condition across governance and conservation regimes. For example, Sze et al. (2022) used FLII in a pan-tropical analysis of forest integrity across overlaps of protected areas and Indigenous peoples' lands.

Crowe et al. (2023) applied FLII to assess forest integrity within thousands of Key Biodiversity Areas (KBAs), highlighting its potential role in monitoring the condition of biodiversity-important sites. BirdLife International has used FLII-based analyses to communicate trends in forest integrity within KBAs identified for forest species.

FLII has also been used as an input or comparison layer in composite integrity metrics and validation studies, including an ecosystem integrity index integrating multiple global datasets and field-based evaluation of how FLII corresponds to ecological indicators in boreal forests.

=== Standards and finance ===
The High Integrity Forest (HIFOR) methodology incorporates FLII thresholds in eligibility criteria for "high integrity" forest areas in its monitoring framework.

== Limitations ==
The original study described FLII as a conservative estimate and noted several limitations. Some pressures are difficult to map consistently at global scale (e.g. finer-scale infrastructure or small-scale extraction), and forest modification prior to 2000 may not be reflected in the underlying global datasets. The authors also noted that the index does not explicitly account for all drivers of integrity loss (such as climate change and invasive species), and that the forest extent definition can include tree crops and plantations, which typically score as low integrity under the model.

== Data and availability ==
An interactive map and downloadable data products (including continuous and classified layers) are provided via the project website.

== Background ==
The FLII was first published on 8 December 2020 in Nature Communications. An author correction published in 2021 corrected an error in a protected-area table in the original article.

The index was authored by a global team of forest conservation experts, including:

| Institution | Author(s) |
|---|---|
| Wildlife Conservation Society, The Bronx | H.S. Grantham; A. Duncan; T. D. Evans; K. R. Jones; J. Walston; J. G. Robinson; M. Callow; T. Clements; H. M. Costa; A. DeGemmis; P. R. Elsen; P. Franco; S. Jupiter; A. Kang; S. Lieberman; M. Linkie; M. Mendez; C. Samper; J. Silverman; T. Stevens; E. Stokes; T. Tear; R. Tizard; S. Wang; J. E. M. Watson |
| University of Queensland, Brisbane | H. L. Beyer; S. Maxwell; H. Possingham; J. E. M. Watson |
| Carleton University, Ottawa | R. Schuster |
| Wildlife Conservation Society Canada, Toronto | J. C. Ray |
| United Nations Development Program, Manhattan | J. Ervin |
| World Resources Institute, Washington, DC | E. Goldman; R. Taylor |
| Northern Arizona University, Flagstaff | S. Goetz; P. Jantz |
| Montana State University, Bozeman | A. Hansen |
| Rainforest Foundation Norway, Oslo | E. Hofsvang |
| Global Wildlife Conservation, Austin, Texas | P. Langhammer; R. Mittermeier |
| Arizona State University, Tempe, Arizona | P. Langhammer |
| James Cook University, Cairns | W. F. Laurance; N. J. Murray |
| University of Oxford, Oxford | Y. Malhi |
| The Nature Conservancy, Arlington, Virginia | H. Possingham |
| Jet Propulsion Laboratory, Pasadena, California | S. Saatchi |
| World Wide Fund for Nature Germany, Berlin | A. Shapiro |
| International Institute of Sustainability, Rio de Janeiro | B. Strassburg |
| University of Northern British Columbia, Prince George, British Columbia | O. Venter |
| International Institute for Applied Systems Analysis, Laxenburg, Austria | P. Visconti |

== See also ==
- Intact forest landscape
- List of countries by forest area
- Forest degradation
- Deforestation
- Habitat fragmentation
- Human Footprint
- Key Biodiversity Areas
- Convention on Biological Diversity
