= Campbell Bay =

Campbell Bay may refer to:

- Campbell Bay (Great Nicobar)
- Campbell Bay (Nunavut), Canada
