= Arctic reindeer =

Conservation status
- Extinct (1900) (IUCN 3.1)

Scientific classification
- Kingdom: Animalia
- Phylum: Chordata
- Class: Mammalia
- Order: Artiodactyla
- Family: Cervidae
- Subfamily: Capreolinae
- Genus: Rangifer
- Species: R. tarandus
- Subspecies: †R. t. eogroenlandicus

Trinomial name
- †Rangifer tarandus eogroenlandicus Degerbøl, 1957

Extinct subspecies of reindeer

The Arctic reindeer (Rangifer tarandus eogroenlandicus), properly known as the East Greenland caribou, was a subspecies of the reindeer (or the caribou in North America) that once lived in north-eastern Greenland. It has been extinct since 1900.

Archaeologists have found bones of small caribou the size of Peary caribou, Rangifer arcticus pearyi, throughout Greenland in the Illinoian-Wisconsin interglacial and through the LGM and early Holocene (Meldgaard 1986). Degerbøl (1957) described the East Greenland caribou (reindeer), R. t. eogroenlandicus, a small caribou that became extinct about 1900, from a relict enclave in north-eastern Greenland (see Figure 2 in Harding, 2022). However, Anderson (1946) thought that the small caribou that were occasionally found in northwest Greenland (and by implication, throughout Greenland in prehistoric times) were Peary caribou. Bennike (1988), comparing bones and noting that Peary caribou have been documented crossing Nares Strait to Greenland, doubted that pearyi and eogroenlandicus were subspecifically distinct. That Peary caribou shared certain mtDNA haplotypes and morphological similarities with it (Kvie et al. 2016) casts further doubt on the validity of R. t. eogroenlandicus. Inuit Qaujimajatuqangit (traditional or community knowledge) records that Peary caribou do, occasionally, cross to Greenland.

The (West) Greenland caribou or reindeer (R. groenlandicus after a recent revision) is larger and darker and not referable to either R. a. pearyi or R. t. eogroenlandicus.

== Historical range ==
The East Greenland caribou’s range was described in c. 1870 as from Scoresby Sound (70° N) in the south to Germania Land (78° N) in the north. The last live observation of the subspecies was in 1899 by A. G. Nathorst.

== Canadian Arctic Archipelago ==
Caribou on most of the High Arctic islands are Peary caribou, R. arcticus pearyi.

== Svalbard, Norway ==
Reindeer on the island group of Svalbard have recently been classified as a full species, R. platyrhinchus. See Svalbard reindeer.

== Other reindeer and caribou populations ==
Many other caribou (North America) and reindeer (Eurasia) live in Arctic regions, that is, north of the Arctic Circle at 66° North (or in tundra, under a botanical definition of Arctic). See Reindeer.
