= Foggy Bay =

Bay in Nunavut, Canada

- Location within Nunavut
- Location: Queen Maud Gulf
- Coordinates: 68°17′N 104°47′W
- Ocean/sea sources: Arctic Ocean
- Basin countries: Canada
- Settlements: Uninhabited

Foggy Bay is an Arctic waterway in the Kitikmeot Region, Nunavut, Canada. It is located in southwestern Queen Maud Gulf, off Nunavut's mainland.

Labyrinth Bay, Campbell Bay and Conolly Bay are nearby.
