= CircumArctic Rangifer Monitoring and Assessment Network =

Scientific Arctic research network

- Formation: 2004
- Founded at: Vancouver, British Columbia
- Key people: Don E. Russell coordinator
- Website: carma.caff.is

CircumArctic Rangifer Monitoring and Assessment Network (CARMA) is a scientific research network, launched in 2004 in Vancouver, British Columbia, and funded by the Canadian International Polar Year (IPY) which focusses on the health of "the North's migratory tundra caribou and wild reindeer populations" in the face of global change, with up to 80% declines of some herds of wild Rangifer since 2004. The collaborative research is undertaken by an international team of scientists, administrators and members of local community members, particularly Rangifer hunters who share a common interest in their survival.

== History ==
In 2000 Rangifer was confirmed as the key indicator species and the official network was endorsed at a Conservation of Arctic Flora and Fauna (CAFF) group gathering in Iceland held "to develop a framework for a circumpolar biodiversity monitoring program."

CARMA was launched in Vancouver, British Columbia, in 2004 and is funded under the Canadian International Polar Year (IPY) program. The Conservation of Arctic Flora and Fauna (CAFF)'s Circumpolar Biodiversity Monitoring Program, "an international network of scientists, governments, Indigenous organizations and conservation groups working to harmonize and integrate efforts to monitor the Arctic's living resources" invited CARMA to become an official network.

During the 24-month period ending in March 2009, over fifty thousand researchers from over sixty countries embarked on collaborative intensive scientific research projects on the polar regions in the fourth and largest International Polar Year (IPY) since its inception in 1882, which resulted in the report entitled "Understanding Earth's Polar Challenges: International Polar Year 2007–2008".

== Organization ==
CARMA "has a small organizing committee coordinated through the Northern Research Institute (NRI) of Yukon College in Whitehorse, Yukon, Canada." CARMA is a network under the CBMP Circumpolar Biodiversity Monitoring Program (CBMP) which delivers biodiversity status to the Conservation of Arctic Flora and Fauna (CAFF) group which reports directly to the Arctic Council (AC). CARMA included scientists from Canada, Iceland, Norway, Sweden, Finland, Denmark, the United States and Russia.

== Tools and resources ==
Tools and resources in 2004 included the caribou anatomy atlas, voices of caribou people, standardized monitoring protocols, manuals, community training video, climate database, CARMA database, models and a website.

== Conferences and publications ==
In 2012 CARMA produced the report entitled "CARMA 8 Moving Forward: Knowledge to Action."

In 2013 CARMA published "CARMA’s MERRA-based caribou range climate database" in the journal Rangifer.

CARMA representatives presented at the 16th North American Caribou Workshop, the "foremost conference of its kind addressing caribou biology, research and management", held in Thunder Bay, Ontario, in May 2016 organized by the Ontario Ministry of Natural Resources and Forestry, Wildlife Conservation Society Canada, Trent University, Sustainable Forestry Initiative, and Amec Foster Wheeler.
