= Labyrinth Bay =

Bay in Nunavut, Canada

- Location within Nunavut
- Location: Queen Maud Gulf
- Coordinates: 68°25′N 105°17′W
- Ocean/sea sources: Arctic Ocean
- Basin countries: Canada
- Settlements: Uninhabited

Labyrinth Bay is an Arctic waterway in Kitikmeot Region, Nunavut, Canada. It is located in southwestern Queen Maud Gulf off Nunavut's mainland.

Described by Arctic explorer Vilhjalmur Stefansson as being dotted with numerous islands, southward from the bay lies a range of rocky hills.

Foggy Bay and Conolly Bay are nearby.
