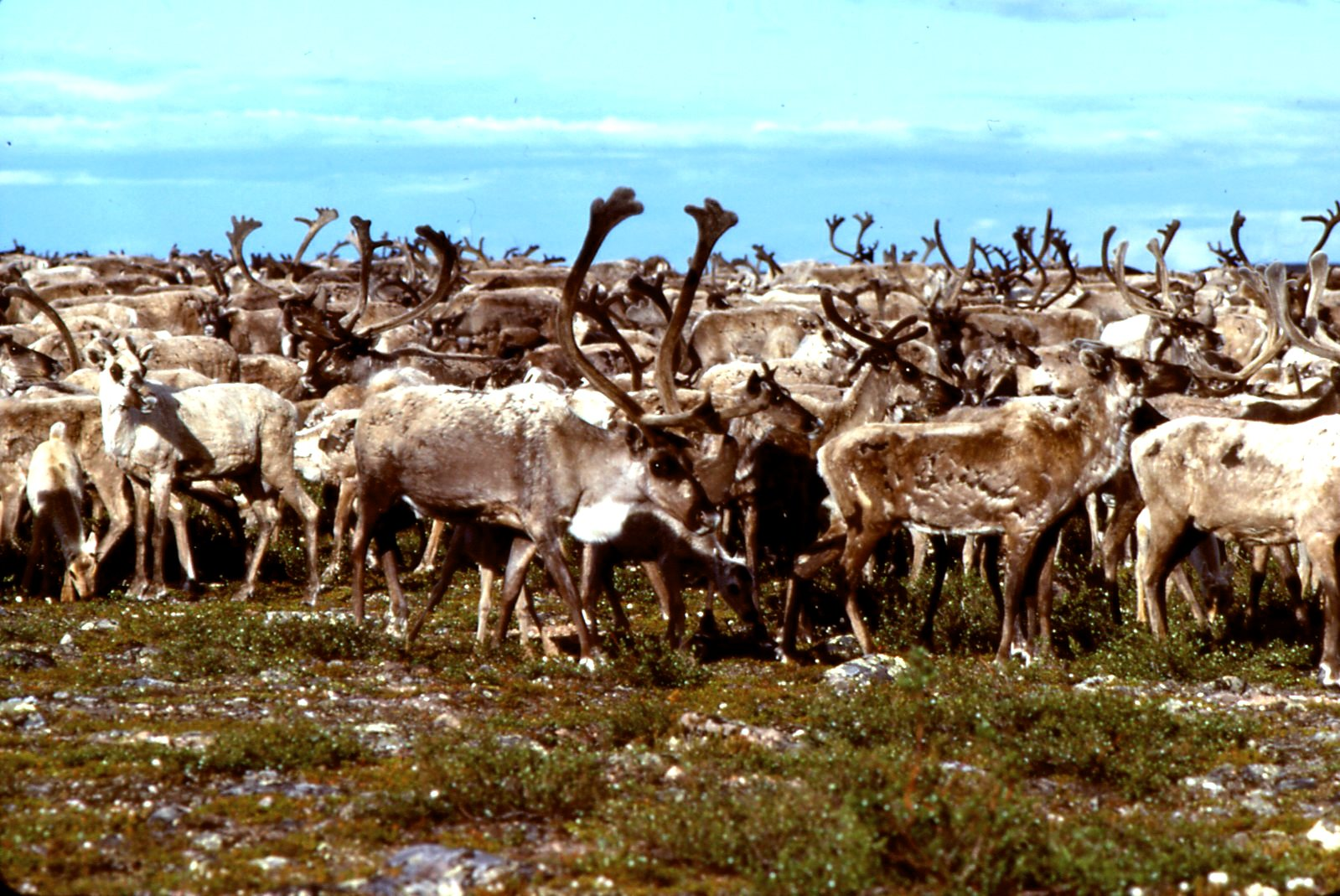
- Barren-ground caribou herd near the Thelon River

Conservation status
- Apparently Secure (NatureServe)

Scientific classification
- Kingdom: Animalia
- Phylum: Chordata
- Class: Mammalia
- Order: Artiodactyla
- Family: Cervidae
- Subfamily: Capreolinae
- Genus: Rangifer
- Species: R. tarandus
- Subspecies: R. t. groenlandicus

Trinomial name
- Rangifer tarandus groenlandicus (Borowski, 1780)
- Approximate range of barren-ground caribou. Overlap with other subspecies of caribou is possible for contiguous range. 1.Rangifer tarandus caribou, which is subdivided into ecotypes: boreal woodland, migratory woodland and mountain woodland; 2. R. t. dawsoni (extinct 1908); 3. R. t. arcticus; 4. R. t. groenlandicus; 5. R. t. groenlandicus; 6. R. t. pearyi

= Barren-ground caribou =

Subspecies of deer

The barren-ground caribou (Rangifer tarandus groenlandicus; but subject to a recent taxonomic revision) is a subspecies of the reindeer (or the caribou in North America) that is found in the Canadian territories of Nunavut and the Northwest Territories, in northern Alaska, and in western Greenland. It includes the Porcupine caribou of Yukon and Alaska. The barren-ground caribou is a medium-sized caribou, smaller and lighter-colored than the boreal woodland caribou, with the females weighing around 90 kg (200 lb) and the males around 150 kg (330 lb). However, on some of the smaller islands, the average weight may be less. The large migratory herds of barren-ground caribou take their names from the traditional calving grounds, such as the Ahiak herd, the Baffin Island herds, the Bathurst herd, the Beverly herd (Beverly Lake in western Nunavut), the Bluenose East herd (southwest of Kugluktuk), the Bluenose West herd, the Porcupine herd and the Qamanirjuaq herd.

== Range and population ==
In Canada about fifty percent of all caribou are barren-ground caribou.

They spend much or all of the year on the tundra from Alaska to Baffin Island. Most, or about 1.2 million, of the barren-ground caribou in Canada live in eight large migratory herds, which migrate seasonally from the tundra to the taiga, sparsely treed coniferous forests south of the tundra. In order, from Alaska to Hudson Bay, these are the Porcupine herd, Cape Bathurst herd, Bluenose West herd, Bluenose East herd, Bathurst herd, Ahiak herd, Beverly herd, and Qamanirjuaq herd. About 120 000 other barren-ground caribou live in smaller herds that spend the entire year on the tundra. Half of these are confined to Baffin Island.

— Hinterland Who's Who

Like the Peary caribou, both the males and females have antlers. In general, during the summer, the coat of the caribou is brown, and much lighter in the winter. The neck and rump tend towards a creamy-white colour. However, the general coloration may differ depending on the region.

The barren-ground caribou usually breeds in the fall and calves in June but may not drop their single calf until July. Usually the female gives birth away from the herd and if possible on a patch of snow. After birth, the female licks the calf clean and eats the tissues and the placenta. This may serve two purposes, to replace nutrients lost from birthing and to help remove the scent that would attract predators.

The main food source is lichen, but they also feed on Cyperaceae (sedges) and grasses along with twigs and mushrooms. Caribou have also been observed eating antlers and seaweed and licking salt deposits. There is some evidence to suggest that, on occasion, they also feed on small rodents such as lemmings, fish such as Arctic char and bird eggs.

On the mainland of Canada, the animals may travel in herds of several thousand, but they move in smaller groups (no more than 50) on the islands. They are migratory animals and may travel 1,200 km (750 mi) in a season. Some groups, such as those living on Victoria Island during the summer, migrate to the mainland in the fall after the sea ice has formed. At this time, the smaller groups may form into a larger herd and several hundred animals may be seen. Mainland barren-ground caribou herds move to coastal areas for part of each year, with the exception of the Beverly herd.

The Beverly herd (located primarily in Saskatchewan and the Northwest Territories, with portions in Nunavut, Manitoba and Alberta) and the Qamanirjuaq herd (located primarily in Manitoba and Nunavut, with portions in the southeastern NWT and northeastern Saskatchewan) fall under the auspices of the Beverly and Qamanirjuaq Caribou Management Board. The range of the Beverly herd spans the tundra from northern Manitoba and Saskatchewan and well into the Northwest Territories and Nunavut. In 1994 survey there were 276,000 caribou, an all-time record. According to a 2011 survey based on data collected using cutting-edge digital tools and fly-over visual surveillance, there were approximately 124,000 caribou in the Beverly herd and 83,300 in the Ahiak herd. The calving grounds of the Beverly herd are located around Queen Maud Gulf, but the herd shifted its traditional birthing area. Ross Thompson, executive director of the Beverly and Qamanirjuaq Caribou Management Board, explains the low calving rate mainly on habitat deterioration and disturbance with other factors contributing to the low growth rate – parasites, predation and poor weather.

Most of the caribou populations in the north are cycling down. It's causing a lot of anxiety for a lot of hunters. We want to...give everybody time to work together to come up with solutions for the short term and until the caribou populations recover.

— 2013, Regional biologist Mitch Campbell

John Nagy, University of Alberta's wildlife biologist and researcher, argued that the Beverly herd was robust, not declining. He claimed the herd had moved their calving grounds "near the western Queen Maud Gulf coast to the north of the herd's "traditional" calving ground in the Gary Lakes area north of Baker Lake." He based his findings on data collected from 510 barren-ground caribou tracked with satellite collars in the Northwest Territories and Nunavut from 1993 to 2009.

The barren-ground caribou, one of several subspecies called tuktu in Inuinnaqtun/Inuktitut, and written as ᓇᐹᕐᑐᕐᑲᓐᖏᑦᑐᒥ ᑐᒃᑐ in Inuktitut syllabics, is a major food source for the Inuit, especially the Caribou Inuit bands living in the Kivalliq Region (Barren Lands) of present-day Nunavut.

The major predator of barren-ground caribou is the Arctic wolf (Canis lupus arctos). Wolves may follow the herd for many miles. The caribou has poor eyesight and hearing, but is capable of outrunning the wolf.

== Dolphin-Union caribou herd ==
The Dolphin-Union caribou herd, locally known as the island caribou, are a migratory population of barren-ground caribou (Rangifer tarandus groenlandicus) that occupy Victoria Island in Canada's High Arctic and the nearby mainland. They are endemic to Canada. They migrate across the Dolphin and Union Strait from their summer grazing on Victoria Island to their winter grazing area on the Nunavut-NWT mainland in Canada. It is unusual for North American caribou to cross sea ice seasonally and the only other caribou subspecies to do so is the Peary caribou (R. t. pearyi), which are smaller in size and population.

== Environmental threats ==
=== Climate change ===
In 2004 the Canadian Government's Species at Risk (SARA) registry placed barren-ground caribou under the status of "special concern". Their status was a result of climate change having a negative impact on the population. Changing climate conditions in the Arctic are predicted to threaten barren-ground caribou in the immediate future. The risks associated with climate change can impact feeding habits, access to food and quality of food, birthing rates and calf rearing, greater distance of migration, thinning ice during migration and insect disturbances.

=== Food sources ===
Climate change negatively impacts barren-ground caribou's access to food. Extreme weather conditions can cause increased amounts of rain and freezing rain during winter months. This results in an ice layer which blocks access to lichen, the caribou's main food source. Frozen feeding grounds during winter months results in greater energy expenditure as the caribou attempt to access the lichen locked beneath the ice. This can result in malnutrition, starvation and death. Research has shown that changes in climate can alter the quality of lichen in the Arctic, making it less nutritious. A changing climate also introduces the threat of foreign plant species to the region, creating competition.

=== Calving season ===
Barren-ground caribou have evolved to match their calving period with the period in which lichen has traditionally bloomed. The phenological process and timing between birthing and easily accessible lichen is critical to the survival rate of the subspecies. The trophic mismatch, due to abnormal temperature variations linked to climate change, have resulted in malnutrition in their young, as well as reduced reproductive rates contributing to population decline.

=== Effects on migration ===
The timing of migration periods is closely linked to seasonal changes and as unpredictable climate conditions increase, barren-ground caribou must migrate over larger distances. Migration is dictated by the access to easily available lichen. An increased distance of migration places further stress and energy expense on the caribou. Warming weather conditions reduce ice thickness over rivers and lakes, making it difficult for caribou to cross. The reduced ice cover creates a natural barrier, which fragments the migration habitat and creates obstacles, preventing caribou from accessing annual feeding and breeding grounds. Unpredictable migration patterns also have negative impacts on Indigenous communities who depend on caribou as a source of income and food.

=== Insect harassment ===
An additional stressor on barren-ground caribou is the irritation from insect behavior, which can dictate the movement and health of caribou during the summer months. Increased warming temperatures and early springs result in greater insect numbers. Insect harassment force caribou to migrate to areas which may still be covered in snow or ice, thereby reducing access to food. Caribou give birth in early spring when insect populations are low, to enable sufficient rearing of healthy and strong calves. Early onset of spring temperatures in the Arctic further effect the phenology of the pregnancy time periods of barren-ground caribou. Insect avoidance forces caribou to expend large amounts of energy through migrational avoidance of insects. Changes in the climate can increase parasitic occurrences, thereby providing an additional threat to the subspecies.

== Evolution ==
Rangifer "evolved as a mountain deer, ...exploiting the subalpine and alpine meadows...". Rangifer originated Late Pliocene and diversified in the Early Pleistocene, a 2+ million-year period of multiple glacier advances and retreats. The oldest undoubted Rangifer fossil is from Omsk, Russia) dated to 2.1-1.8 Ma. The oldest North American Rangifer fossil is from the Yukon, 1.6 million years before present (BP). Several named Rangifer fossils in Eurasia and North America predate the evolution of modern tundra reindeer.

Archaeologists distinguish "modern" tundra reindeer and barren-ground caribou from primitive forms — living and extinct — that did not have adaptations to extreme cold and to long-distance migration. They include a broad, high muzzle to increase the volume of the nasal cavity to warm and moisten the air before it enters the throat and lungs, bez tines set close to the brow tines, distinctive coat patterns, short legs and other adaptations for running long distances, and multiple behaviors suited to tundra, but not to forest (such as synchronized calving and aggregation during rutting and post-calving). As well, many genes, including those for vitamin D metabolism, fat metabolism, retinal development, circadian rhythm, and tolerance to cold temperatures, are found in tundra caribou that are lacking or rudimentary in forest types. For this reason, forest-adapted reindeer and caribou could not survive in tundra or polar deserts, nor could barren-ground or Peary caribou survive (or at least successfully reproduce) in boreal forest, and this explains the rarity of introgression of barren-ground caribou into woodland caribou, and almost none the other way.

DNA analysis shows that woodland caribou (R. caribou) diverged from primitive ancestors of tundra/barren-ground caribou not during the last glacial maximum, 26,000–19,000 years ago, as previously assumed, but in the Middle Pleistocene around 357,000 years ago. At that time, modern tundra caribou had not even evolved (see Reindeer: Evolution). Woodland caribou are likely more related to extinct forest caribou subspecies than to barren-ground caribou. For example, the extinct caribou Torontoceros [Rangifer] hypogaeus, had features (robust and short pedicles, smooth antler surface, and high position of second tine) that relate it to forest caribou. Because woodland and barren-ground caribou likely do not share a direct common ancestor, they cannot be conspecific.

Conversely, Molecular data also revealed that the four western Canadian montane ecotypes are not woodland caribou as currently classified (in Canada): they share a common ancestor with modern barren-ground/tundra reindeer and caribou, but distantly, having diverged > 60,000 years ago — before the modern barren-ground ecotype had evolved its cold- and darkness-adapted physiologies and mass-migration and aggregation behaviors, (see Reindeer: Evolution). Before Banfield (1961), taxonomists using cranial, dental and skeletal measurements had unequivocally allied these western montane ecotypes with barren-ground caribou, naming them (as in Osgood 1909 Murie, 1935 and Anderson 1946, among others) R. a. stonei, R. a. montanus, R. a. fortidens and R. a. osborni, respectively, and this phylogeny was confirmed by genetic analysis.

== Taxonomy ==
From 1898 to 1937, mammalogists named 11 new species (other than Greenland caribou, barren-ground caribou and woodland caribou, which had been named earlier) in Canada and Alaska (see synonymies in Rudolph Martin Anderson, 1946). Banfield (1961) synonymized them down to one species with four living subspecies (caribou, pearyi, groenlandicus and granti), but most specialists did not accept this and continued to recognize R. t. caboti (Labrador caribou), Newfoundland caribou (R. t. terranovae) and Osborn's caribou (R. t. osborni). Banfield (1961) had extended the tiny, pale granti (originally Rangifer granti Allen 1902) of the west end of the Alaska Peninsula and nearby islands to all of Alaska and part of Yukon, including the Porcupine herd, which was originally described as R. ogilviensis (Millais 1915), after the Ogilvie Mountains that form part of its winter range. Youngman (1975) realized Banfield's mistake and referred the barren-ground caribou of the Porcupine herd (and by implication, to other Alaskan barren-ground herds) to R. t. groenlandicus.

Current taxonomy recognizes just one species of reindeer/caribou: Rangifer tarandus. Subspecies in North America are, R. t. caboti, R. t. caribou, R. t. dawsoni, R. t. groenlandicus, R. t. osborni, R. t. pearyi, and R. t. terranovae; and in Eurasia, R. t. tarandus, R. t. buskensis (called R. t. valentinae in Europe), R. t. phylarchus, R. t. pearsoni, R. t. sibiricus and R. t. platyrhynchus.

In consideration of the voluminous genetic and other data revealing diversity at the species and subspecies levels that is not reflected in the current taxonomy, a recent revision resurrects several species (Greenland caribou, R. groenlandicus; woodland caribou, R. caribou; and Arctic caribou, R. arcticus) in North America) and several subspecies.

== See also ==
- Caribou herds and populations in Canada
- Reindeer hunting in Greenland
