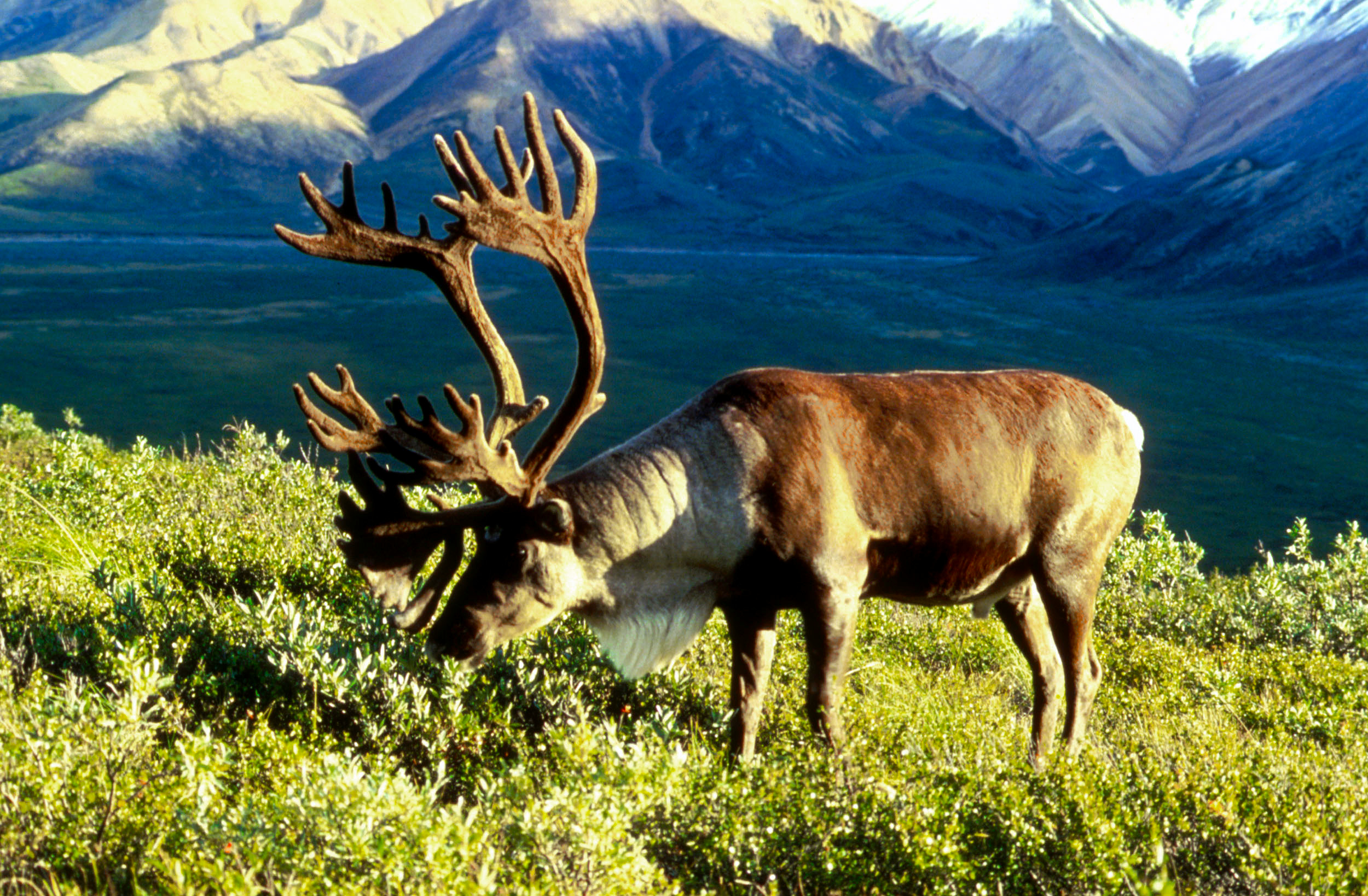
- Male Porcupine caribou (R. a. arcticus) grazing in Alaska

Scientific classification
- Kingdom: Animalia
- Phylum: Chordata
- Class: Mammalia
- Order: Artiodactyla
- Family: Cervidae
- Subfamily: Capreolinae
- Genus: Rangifer
- Species: R. arcticus
- Subspecies: R. a. arcticus, pearyi, fortidens, montanus, osborni, stonei, dawsoni (extinct)

Trinomial name
- Rangifer arcticus arcticus, pearyi, fortidens, montanus, osborni, stonei, dawsoni (extinct) Richardson, 1829
- Approximate range of Porcupine caribou in yellow. Overlap with other subspecies of caribou is possible for contiguous range. 1. Woodland caribou (Rangifer caribou), which is subdivided into ecotypes: boreal, migratory and mountain, 2. R. a. dawsoni (extinct 1908), 3. R. a. arcticus, 4. R. t. groenlandicus, 5. R. a. arcticus, 6. R. a. pearyi

= Porcupine caribou =

Subspecies of deer

The Porcupine caribou is a herd or ecotype of the mainland barren-ground caribou (Rangifer arcticus arcticus, syn. R. tarandus groenlandicus), the subspecies of the reindeer or caribou found in Alaska, United States, and Yukon and the Northwest Territories, Canada.

Migratory caribou herds are named after their calving grounds, in this case the Porcupine River, which runs through a large part of the range of the Porcupine herd. Though numbers fluctuate, the herd comprises about 218,000 animals (based on a July 2017 photocensus). They migrate over 1,500 mi (2,400 km) a year between their winter range and calving grounds at the Beaufort Sea, the longest land migration route of any land mammal on Earth. Their range spans the Alaska-Yukon border and is a valued resource cooperatively managed by the Alaska Department of Fish and Game, Canadian wildlife agencies and local aboriginal peoples. The caribou are the primary sustenance of the Gwichʼin, a First Nations/Alaska Native people, who traditionally built their communities to align with the caribou's migration patterns. They are also routinely hunted by other indigenous peoples, including the Inupiat, the Inuvialuit, the Hän and the Northern Tutchone.

By July 2017, the Porcupine herd had reached a record high of about 202,000 to 235,000 animals. Sixteen years earlier, in 2001 the same herd was only half as large. While other barren-ground caribou herds have declined by 90%, the Porcupine herd has remained relatively stable.

== Taxonomy ==
The Porcupine caribou is a herd of the barren-ground caribou found in Alaska, United States, and Yukon and the Northwest Territories, Canada. It is included in the subspecies called the barren-ground caribou (R. tarandus groenlandicus). The Porcupine caribou was first named Rangifer ogilviensis Millais, 1915 after the Ogilvie Mountains, part of its Yukon winter range. It has also been known as Grant's caribou (R. a. granti; subsequently R. t. granti).

Grant's caribou was described as a small, pale form occupying a limited range at the west end of the Alaska Peninsula and nearby islands. Originally described as Rangifer granti (Allen, 1902), it was brought under barren-ground caribou as R. arcticus granti because its size and form were closer to the barren-ground type than to the larger, darker montane forms in Alaska. When Banfield revised the Rangifer genus, bringing all reindeer and caribou under Rangifer tarandus, he gave the subspecies name granti to all the caribou in Alaska and some in Yukon, thus greatly expanding its range. Subsequently, taxonomists comparing Alaskan or Yukon migratory barren-ground caribou with those of mainland Canada labelled their Alaska/Yukon samples as R. t. granti. Youngman (1975) re-assigned it to Canada/Alaska barren-ground caribou, R. tarandus groenlandicus after Banfield's (1961) name change. Because Geist (1998), and others, could find no morphological features to distinguish Alaskan from Canadian barren-ground caribou, granti was not accepted in the authoritative reference work, Mammalian Species of the World (Grubb, Artiodactyla in Wilson and Reeder 2005) and its replacement, Handbook of the mammals of the World (Mattioli, Cervidae, in Wilson and Mittermeier 2011). Caribou geneticists agree that Alaska/Yukon migratory barren-ground and Canadian barren-ground caribou are barely distinguishable (e.g., Cronin et al. 2005; Yannic et al. 2013). Further history of the name granti is given in Reindeer.

In a stunning sequel, caribou geneticists discovered that caribou still living at the western end of the Alaskan Peninsula and nearby islands—which contains the type locality of Rangifer granti Allen 1902—are genetically distinct from, and do not interbreed with, nearby forms of caribou. Its range encompasses the type locality designated by Allen 1902. Thus, R. a. granti was rediscovered in its original, limited range and its type species in the American Museum of Natural History remains valid.

A recent revision returns the Porcupine and other herds of barren-ground caribou to R. arcticus arcticus Richardson 1829.

== Range ==
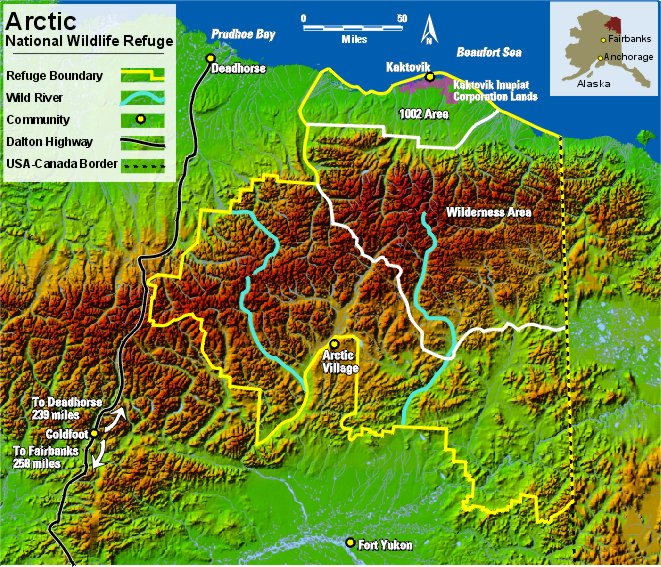
Boundary of the Arctic National Wildlife Refuge (ANWR) in yellow

The Porcupine herd range covers 1,500 mi (2,400 km), from the calving grounds, the Porcupine River after which they are named, to "the river valleys and slopes in the Ogilvie and Richardson Mountains in the Yukon and the southern Brooks Range in Alaska." The calving area is located on 1.5 million acres (0.61 million ha) in the Porcupine River coastal region of the Beaufort Sea known as the 1002 area, which is part of the Arctic National Wildlife Refuge. The area runs through a large part of the range of the Porcupine herd.

In the spring the pregnant cows move "northeast from the Alaskan winter ranges or north and northwest from the Canadian winter ranges. If snowmelt is early, they will then move westward along the north slope of the Brooks Range into Alaska."

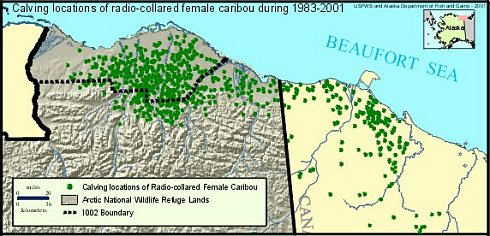
Caribou calving grounds, 1983–2001

Most Porcupine caribou calves are born in the first week of June and they are at their most vulnerable from their primary predators on the calving ground—golden eagles, grizzly bears and wolves—during the first three weeks when they are dependent on milk from their mothers. About one quarter of them die during this period. Their 840-mile (1,350 km) annual land migration between their winter range in the boreal forests of Alaska and Yukon over the mountains to the coastal plain and their calving grounds on the Beaufort Sea coastal plain, is the longest of any land mammal on earth.

== Management ==
The Alaska Department of Fish and Game, Canadian wildlife agencies, and local aboriginal peoples cooperatively manage the Porcupine herd. The Porcupine Caribou Management Board (PCMB) advisory board was established under the Porcupine Caribou Management Agreement in 1985, whose members include representatives from the Gwich'in Tribal Council, Na-cho Nyäk Dün, Vuntut Gwitchin, Government of Yukon, Tr'ondëk Hwëch'in, Inuvialuit Game Council, the Government of the Northwest Territories and the Government of Canada. The PCMB publish an annual Porcupine Caribou Harvest Report. In their February 2018 report they recorded that a 2017 photocensus (survey) estimated a mean of 218,457 caribou (95% CI = 202,106 to 234,808) caribou, indicative of an increasing trend from 2010 to 2017, from 169,000 to about 218,000. On July 17, 1987, the United States and the Canadian governments signed the "Agreement on the Conservation of the Porcupine Caribou Herd," a treaty designed to protect the subspecies from damage to its habitat and migration routes. Both the Ivvavik National Park and Vuntut National Park border the ANWR. The treaty required an impact assessment and required that where activity in one country is "likely to cause significant long-term adverse impact on the Porcupine Caribou Herd or its habitat, the other Party will be notified and given an opportunity to consult prior to final decision". This focus on the Porcupine caribou led to the animal becoming a visual rhetoric or symbol of the drilling issue much in the same way the polar bear has become the symbol of global warming.

=== Herd size ===
"We might have just recorded [July 2017] the largest number for this herd since modern scientific monitoring started in the 1970s... Given the state of caribou worldwide right now, it's a positive, shining light in the caribou world — that there are some herds that are doing well."

— Mike Suitor, regional biologist, North Yukon Region with Environment Yukon, Dawson City. 2018. CBC News

Unlike many other Rangifer species, subspecies and their ecotypes, the Porcupine herd is stable at relatively high numbers. Some barren-ground caribou herds have "declined more than 90 per cent from historic averages", causing the Committee on the Status of Endangered Wildlife in Canada (COSEWIC), to sound the alarm.

According to an aerial count reported in July 2017, the size of the Porcupine herd had increased to "between 202,000 and 235,000 animals, nearly twice the number of animals recorded at a low point in 2001.

A previous peak population occurred in 1989 with 178,000 animals and was followed by a decline by 2001 to 123,000. A recovery was observed in 2010 with an increase to 169,000 animals.

== Potential threats to the Porcupine herd ==
Climate change and the increased frequency of extreme weather events, such as unprecedented late slow melting, negatively affect the Porcupine herd. As a result there was "very high early calf mortality." The primary predators for calves are golden eagles, grizzly bears and wolves. "Caribou exposed to industrial development shift away from the pipelines and roads." The passage of the provision opening ANWR's 1002 to oil and gas drilling is considered to be a threat. In 2001, some biologists feared development in the Refuge would "push caribou into the foothills, where calves would be more prone to predation." In their 2005 report, Russell and McNeil reiterated concerns that new calving areas would make the herd more vulnerable, as area 1002 provides a much higher quality of diet conditions than the alternatives in Canada.

== Indigenous peoples ==
The Porcupine caribou are a valued resource as primary sustenance to indigenous peoples in Alaska and northern Canada. Gwichʼin, a First Nations/Alaska Native people traditionally built their communities to align with the caribou's migration patterns. The Inupiat, the Inuvialuit, the Hän and the Northern Tutchone also hunt caribou from this herd on a regular basis.

== Arctic National Wildlife Refuge ==
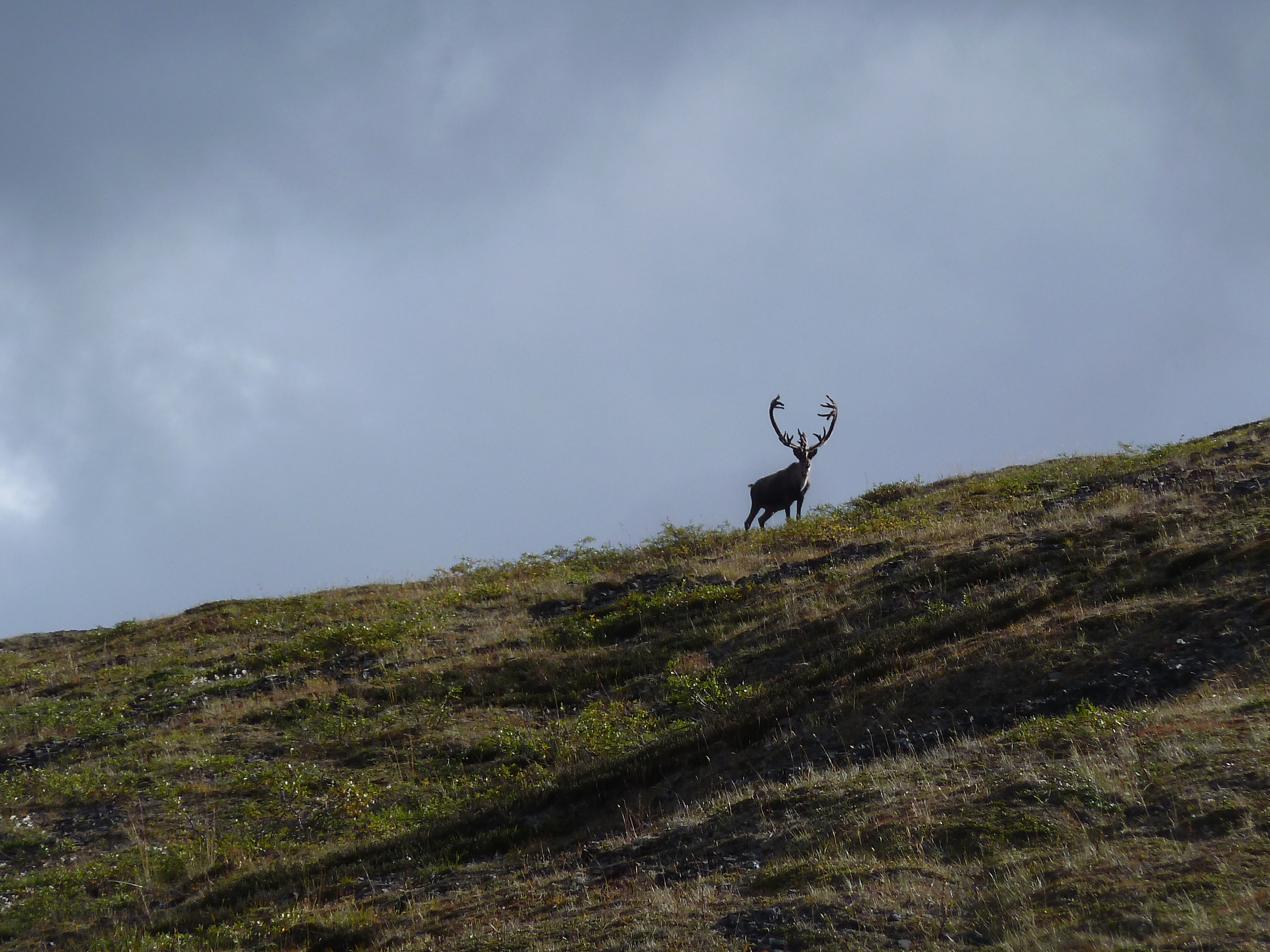
Caribou in the western Brooks range

The Arctic National Wildlife Refuge (ANWR) covers 19 million acres (7.7 million ha) of the northern Alaskan coast, in northeast Alaska between the Beaufort Sea to the north, Brooks Range to the south and Prudhoe Bay to the west. It is the largest protected wilderness in the United States and was created by Congress under the Alaska National Interest Lands Conservation Act of 1980.

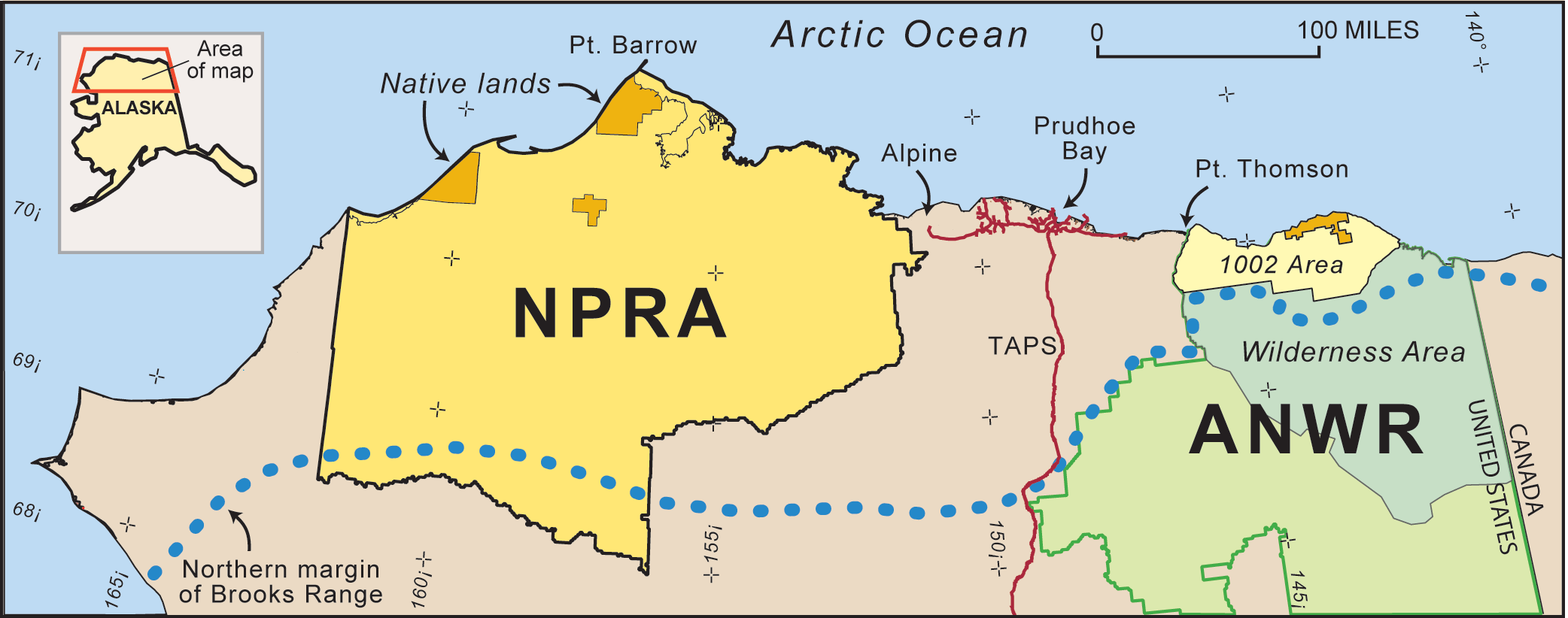
The Alaska North Slope with The National Petroleum Reserve to the West, the Arctic National Wildlife Refuge with area 1002 to the east.

On December 22, 2017, President Donald Trump signed the Tax Cuts and Jobs Act of 2017, a provision that opened the 1002 area of ANWR to oil and gas drilling, into law. The Act contains provisions that would open 1.5 million acres in the Arctic National Wildlife Refuge to oil and gas drilling. Opening the Arctic Refuge to drilling "unleashed a torrent of opposition from conservationists and scientists." Democrats and environmentalist groups such as the Wilderness Society criticized the Republican effort. Since 1977 area 1002, which encompasses much of the Porcupine caribou calving grounds, has been a topic of controversy. The 1,500,000 acres (6,100 km^{2}) subsection on the coastal plain, known as the "1002 area" is located between the Brooks Range and the Beaufort Sea. The plain "stretches west from the Yukon border more than a hundred miles, a flat expanse of tundra laced with tussock wetlands and braided rivers."

== Ivvavik National Park ==
Video of Porcupine caribou in Becharof National Wildlife Refuge, Alaska

Ivvavik National Park protects a portion of the calving grounds of the Porcupine herd and restricts the number of people who may visit annually. During the calving in May, caribou are at their most vulnerable. Caribou management calls for preservation of calving grounds. Large portions of the calving grounds have been protected in the Arctic National Wildlife Refuge in Alaska, United States, and Ivvavik National Park and Vuntut National Park in Yukon, Canada.

=== Central Arctic caribou herd ===
In 2001, proponents of the development of the oil fields at Prudhoe Bay and Kuparuk, which would be approximately 60 miles (97 km) west of the refuge, argued that the Central Arctic caribou herd had increased its numbers "in spite of several hundred miles of gravel roads and more than a thousand miles of elevated pipe." However, the Central Arctic herd is much smaller than the Porcupine herd and has a range that is much larger.

The 1002 coastal plain provides calving habitat for [the Porcupine herd] nearly five times as large as the central Arctic herd, in an area one-fifth as big. Some biologists fear development here could push caribou into the foothills, where calves would be more prone to predation

— Mitchell National Geographic 2001

== See also ==
- Arctic Refuge drilling controversy
- Being Caribou
- Caribou herds and populations in Canada
- Jonathon Solomon
- Reindeer distribution
