= Wildlife Conservation Society Canada =

- Formation: 2004
- Headquarters: Toronto, Ontario
- Key people: Justina Ray President & Senior Scientist
- Affiliations: Wildlife Conservation Society International (WCS)

The Wildlife Conservation Society Canada (WCS Canada), based in Toronto, Ontario, is the Canadian affiliate of the Wildlife Conservation Society International (WCS), incorporated as a conservation organization in Canada in July 2004. WCS Canada currently runs conservation projects across six key regions in Canada led by its staff of field-based scientists.

WCS Canada is an environmental organization that generates science through applied field-based research and uses this research to achieve conservational goals. Issues addressed by the group include protected area design, wildlife monitoring and recovery, ecosystem restoration, and community-based conservation.

== Mission ==
The stated mission of WCS Canada is:

"The Wildlife Conservation Society Canada conserves wildlife and wild places by understanding the issues, developing science-based solutions, and working with others to carry out conservation actions across Canada."

== History ==
WCS' activities in Canada began in 1905 when William Hornaday (one of the founders of the New York Zoological Society, the original name of WCS) visited the Crowsnest Pass in southeast British Columbia and called for the conservation of the area. The organization has maintained a conservation presence in the region since that time. In 1912, WCS was a principal architect of the Alaskan Fur Seal Treaty, and the Migratory Bird Treaty between Canada, USA and Mexico. Between 1949 and 1981, WCS supported various activities in Canada, including arctic expeditions to Bylot Island and research on seals, merlin, whooping cranes, polar bears, and bowhead whales. Beginning in 1997, WCS scientist John Weaver conducted Canada lynx surveys in Kootenay and Banff National Parks, after which the organization’s activities in Canada continued on an ongoing basis. WCS Canada was established as an organization in 2004 and has since expanded to numerous field projects in six regions of Canada (Arctic, Northern Appalachians, Northern Ontario, Northern Boreal Mountains, Southern Rocky Mountains, and Nahanni National Park) and maintains involvement in a number of WCS global programs.

== Conservation of wildlife and wild places ==
WCS Canada works to conserve wildlife and wild places by focusing their field research on six regions of Canada and across a suite of ecologically important species. Their research addresses ecological threats associated with global climate change, natural resource extraction, and habitat fragmentation. By focusing on a strategic portfolio of species including woodland caribou, wolverine, Canada lynx, lake trout, and American bison, WCS Canada extends its understanding of conservation needs beyond individual sites and threats.

WCS Canada also provides science to decision-makers providing a critical foundation for credible decision-making. It also plays a crucial role in helping decision-makers and the general public understand the risks and impacts of choices for wildlife and ecosystems. WCS Canada scientists are informing land-use planning and related policies by generating science and by applying findings to relevant conservation processes. The results and expertise derived from WCS research and its partners have a demonstrated track record of improving policies and legislation to conserve northern wildlife and habitats.

WCS Canada is working on transboundary conservation in the Northern Appalachian/Acadia Ecoregion that extends from the state of New York to Nova Scotia in collaboration with Two Countries, One Forest, focusing on wildlife connectivity, mapping the ecological footprint, and studying the ecology of small carnivores (e.g. lynx and marten). Their work in Northern Ontario, the largest intact boreal forest in North America, addresses the threats of development and climate change to wildlife and fish including caribou, wolverine, wolves, Canada lynx, lake sturgeon, walleye, and lake trout.

WCS scientists are also working in the Northern Boreal Mountains in Yukon and northern British Columbia where government-mandated land use planning is proceeding region by region. These planning processes allow WCS scientists to engage in land use zoning and protected area delineation by providing new science, technical support, and stakeholder commentary. Their current research in this region includes a study on the value of valley bottom habitats for wildlife, habitat management for caribou, and mapping intact, priority ecosystems. In the Southern Rocky Mountains, WCS is working to evaluate high-quality habitat and connectivity for a suite of sensitive species including grizzly bears, wolverines, lynx, elk, mountain goats, bull trout, and westslope cutthroat trout.

Recently, WCS Canada conducted research on three focal species in Nahanni National Park Reserve - grizzly bear, caribou and Dall sheep. These studies provided scientific support for a massive expansion of Nahanni National Park (from 1,862 square miles to 12,000 square miles) to help ensure its ecological integrity. WCS Canada also undertook research in the Western Arctic including understanding the terrestrial food web, assessing the threat of mining, and polar bear conservation.

While an independent organisation, WCS Canada is an integral part of a network of WCS Global Programs. Some of the global conservation projects that WCS Canada is involved in include wildlife health, the conservation of the Ituri Forest of DR Congo, the community-managed forests of Madagascar, conservation of tigers in nine countries (Cambodia, PR China, India, Indonesia, Lao PDR, Malaysia, Myanmar, Russia, and Thailand), and conservation of the Iranian cheetah.

== Major conservation achievements ==
In 2018, WCS Canada improved tracking of wolverine populations through tagging in northern Ontario's boreal forest. They nurtured deep relationships with Indigenous Peoples in Canada to inform wildlife conservation projects "given the significant local knowledge" and "community-based monitoring". They worked with First Nations communities in Yukon and northern British Columbia by sharing WCS Canada's "expertise on conservation of fish and wildlife species to assist with the designing protected areas". In northern Ontario they worked with Moose Cree First Nation on a study of the "differences in lake sturgeon behavior in dammed and undammed rivers." They worked with Inuvialuit communities in the western Arctic, to "monitor seal health and diet as an indicator of the broader health of Arctic marine ecosystems."

Scientists at Thompson Rivers University and McMaster University worked with WCS researchers to find solutions for white-nose syndrome (WNS). WNS has "eradicated millions of bats in eastern North America." The WCS Canada Arctic research team monitored "ship noise and whale communications" for "potential impacts of increased ship traffic and noise" on whales and other marine mammals in the Northwest Passage. WCS Canada's scientists worked on a "blueprint" for the proposed Bighorn Wildland Provincial Park which would protect the Bighorn Backcountry adjacent to Banff National Park", an area that "connects to the larger Rocky Mountain corridor and helps keep clean mountain water flowing through central Alberta".

== COSEWIC ==
WCS Canada President, Justina C. Ray, served on the Committee on the Status of Endangered Wildlife in Canada (COSEWIC) Terrestrial Mammals Specialist Subcommittee for nine years. She served as their point of contact scientist on matters related to caribou and other terrestrial mammals. COSEWIC is the "body that undertakes assessments of Canada’s wildlife species under the federal Species at Risk Act." In November 2011, COSEWIC voted to accept the Designatable Unit (DU) structure for caribou in Canada based on the Terrestrial Mammals Specialist Subcommittee's report. In her presentation at the 14th North American Caribou Workshop in November 2012, Justina Ray described her work with COSEWIC in developing the twelve Designatable units (DUs) for caribou in Canada. In a 2019 Globe and Mail article, Ray explained that the 11 Designatable units are categorized as "distinct because of a combination of their habitat, ecology, and genetic differences. Some units contain only one herd; larger units have dozens."

In her October 31, 2018 article in Canadian Geographic, Ray described how their "single most challenging task was systematically evaluating the status of these 11 groups of caribou. The committee did this through the production of six status assessment reports during the period from 2012 to 2017, which involved the collective efforts of hundreds of people. For each report, it took two to three years to assemble the data (including Indigenous knowledge), then compile them into a comprehensive report, subject the report to robust review, before finally delivering the results to the COSEWIC table for a vote on status.
