= Campbell Bay (Nunavut) =

Bay in Nunavut, Canada

- Location within Nunavut
- Location: Queen Maud Gulf
- Coordinates: 68°08′N 104°00′W
- Basin countries: Canada
- Settlements: Uninhabited

Campbell Bay is an Arctic waterway in Kitikmeot Region, Nunavut, Canada. It is located on the south side of the Queen Maud Gulf, east of White Bear Point on Nunavut's mainland.

Labyrinth Bay, Foggy Bay and Conolly Bay are nearby.

== Geography ==
It has a soft mud bottom.
