= Caribou herds and populations in Canada =

Caribou herds in Canada are discrete populations of seven subspecies that are represented in Canada. Caribou can be found from the High Arctic region south to the boreal forest and Rocky Mountains and from the east to the west coasts.

Arctic peoples, including the Caribou Inuit, the inland-dwelling Inuit of the Kivalliq Region in northern Canada, the Caribou Clan in Yukon, the Iñupiat, the Inuvialuit, the Hän, the Northern Tutchone, and the Gwich'in, who followed the Porcupine caribou (also known as Grant's caribou) for millennia, have depended on caribou for food, clothing, and shelter.

COSEWIC divided caribou ecotypes in Canada into 12 "designatable units" (DU), an adaptation of "evolutionarily significant units", for purposes of conservation and monitoring that, for the most part, follow previously named species and subspecies (see Caribou Subspecies below). They are: Peary DU1, Dolphin and Union DU2, Barren-Ground DU3, Eastern Migratory DU4, Newfoundland DU5, Boreal DU6, Northern Mountain DU7, Central Mountain DU8, Southern Mountain DU9, Torngat Mountains DU10, Atlantic-Gaspésie DU11, and the extinct Dawson's DU12.

The responsibility for the management and monitoring of herds is often shared between Inuit, Métis, and First Nations communities, local hunter and trapper associations, territorial and provincial governments, and the federal government.

Based on the most recent 10-year long assessment of caribou populations in Canada, every designated unit of caribou across the country, is in "some kind of danger." More than half of the DUs were endangered. In 2018, vast herds that used to be numbered in the millions, and were not in danger 15 years ago, are now threatened and scientists have recommended that the eastern migratory caribou be listed as endangered, "the highest level of threat".

== Caribou subspecies ==
=== Current classification ===
These subspecies are recognized internationally (before a recent revision; see below): In North America, R. t. caboti, R. t. caribou, R. t. dawsoni, R. t. groenlandicus, R. t. osborni, R. t. pearyi, and R. t. terranovae; and in Eurasia R. t. tarandus, R. t. buskensis (called R. t. valentinae in Europe; see below), R. t. phylarchus, R. t. pearsoni, R. t. sibiricus and R. t. platyrhynchus.

Grant's caribou, originally R. granti Allen, was described as a small, pale form endemic to the west end of the Alaska Peninsula and nearby islands. It was later brought under Arctic caribou (Rangifer arcticus Richardson 1829) as R. a. granti with the same limited distribution. Banfield (1961) initially kept Allen's R. a. granti as restricted to the Alaska Peninsula and archipelago, but later extended it to all Alaskan caribou (except stonei, the montane ecotype) including the former R. ogilviensis (the Porcupine herd). But granti was never accepted internationally as a subspecies of barren-ground caribou, and Youngman (1975) assigned the Porcupine herd (and by inference, all four Alaskan tundra herds) to barren-ground caribou, R. t. groenlandicus.

Banfield (1961) also synonymized stonei with subspecies of woodland caribou, R. t. caribou.

=== 2022 revision ===
Since 1986, nearly four decades of genetic analysis of Rangifer populations using nuclear DNA and mitochondrial DNA (mtDNA) have reported caribou and reindeer population genetics. They have revealed diversity at the species and subspecies level that was not recognized by taxonomic authorities since revisions in the mid-20th Century (see Reindeer: Taxonomy). Genetic data were brought together with morphological, ecological, behavioral and archaeological data, resulting in a new revision of Rangifer. Major changes for caribou in Canada were: (1) resurrection of previous names for Arctic and Woodland caribou; (2) woodland caribou diverged from other species of Rangifer not by isolation in the last glacial maximum (LGM) but deep in the Pleistocene about 357,000 years ago; (3) Canadian barren-ground caribou and Eurasian tundra reindeer, although both of recent (late Pleistocene) Beringian-Eurasian ancestry, clustered separately with genetic distance, private vs. shared haplotypes and alleles indicating they are distinct species; (4) the four western montane ecotypes in Canada and Alaska that had been subsumed under woodland caribou were found to be of Beringian-Eurasian ancestry, but distantly (they diverged > 60,000 years ago, before modern tundra reindeer/barren-ground caribou had evolved; see Reindeer: Evolution), (5) the extinct Dawson caribou is also of Beringian-Eurasian ancestry, (6) R. a. granti was rediscovered when specimens from the original, limited range were found to cluster genetically apart from all other Alaskan caribou, with no interbreeding with nearby ecotypes. (7) Stone's caribou, R. a. stonei, was confirmed as of Beringian-Eurasian ancestry, but clusters apart from osborni, granti, and arcticus; resulting in resurrection of this subspecies.

The Porcupine caribou herd of barren-ground caribou, named for a river that flows from Yukon into Alaska, was originally named R. ogilviensis Millais, 1915 for its winter range in the Ogilvie mountains, but morphological and genetic analyses showed it to be nearly indistinguishable from other barren-ground caribou; after the revision, it reverted to R. arcticus arcticus.

In the new taxonomy, nine subspecies of Rangifer are represented in Canada, most of which line up with COSEWIC's designatable units. Woodland caribou, R. caribou, has three subspecies: the nominate subspecies, boreal woodland caribou DU6, (R. c. caribou), Labrador caribou DU4, (R. c. caboti), and Newfoundland caribou DU5 (R. c. terraenovae). Arctic caribou, R. arcticus, has eight living subspecies and one extinct in Canada: the nominate subspecies, barren-ground caribou DU3, R. a. arcticus; Peary caribou DU1 (R. a. pearyi); Osborn's caribou "Northern Mountain" DU7, R. a. osborni; Rocky Mountain caribou "Central Mountain" DU8, R. a. fortidens; and Mountain caribou "Southern Mountain population of southern mountain caribou" DU9, R. a. montanus; and the extinct Dawson's caribou DU12 of Haida Gwaii, R. a. dawsoni. The Dolphin and Union "herd" DU2, is a unique and genetically distinct ecotype of barren-ground caribou, R. a. arcticus, that migrates from winter range on the Barrenlands across Dolphin and Union Strait; it should probably be a named subspecies of R. arcticus but has not been formally described. Likewise, the Atlantic-Gaspésie caribou DU11 is genetically distinct enough for subspecies designation but has not been described. The Torngat Mountains caribou DU10 is a non-migratory ecotype of Labrador caribou, R. c. caboti. The above caribou names and those in following sections reflect a recent revision, but may not be in common use until international organizations adopt the new taxonomy.

Four subspecies are found in Inuit Nunangat.

For purposes of management and conservation, caribou populations are further divided into the boreal population in Yukon, Northwest Territories, British Columbia, Alberta, Saskatchewan, Manitoba, Ontario, Quebec, Newfoundland and Labrador which includes the George River caribou and the Leaf River caribou, the Atlantic-Gaspésie caribou population in Quebec, the Dolphin-Union caribou in the Northwest Territories and Nunavut, the barren-ground population in Yukon, Northwest Territories, Nunavut, Alberta, Saskatchewan, and Manitoba which includes the large migratory herds such as the Ahiak herd, the Baffin Island herds, the Bathurst herd, the Beverly herd (Beverly Lake in western Nunavut), the Bluenose East herd (southwest of Kugluktuk), the Bluenose West herd, the Porcupine herd, the Qamanirjuaq herd, Lorillard herd, Wager Bay herd, Pen Islands herd, Cape Churchill herd, Southampton Island Herd, and Tuktoyaktuk Peninsula Herd. Porcupine caribou herd, Bluenose west herd, and the Dolphin Union herd, the Central Mountain population in British Columbia and Alberta, the Southern Mountain population in British Columbia, the Eastern Migratory population of Manitoba, Ontario, Quebec, Newfoundland and Labrador, and the Torngat Mountains population of Nunavut, Quebec, Newfoundland and Labrador, the Newfoundland population in Newfoundland and Labrador and the Northern Mountain population in Yukon, Northwest Territories, and British Columbia, Eastern Migratory in Newfoundland, Northern Mountain in British Columbia, Dolphin and Union, and Peary caribou.

In the following sections, to avoid confusion, Latin name reflect the international consensus before the recent revision.

=== Woodland caribou, R. t. caribou ===
==== Boreal woodland ====
The boreal forest of Canada is the vital habitat of the endangered subspecies, the boreal caribou. The survival of boreal caribou depends on maintaining "large unbroken swaths" of the forest to protect the animals from their predators. The boreal forest—which is not monolithic but a patchwork—sweeps through parts of all provinces and territories except Nova Scotia and Prince Edward Island. It covers approximately 25% of Canada's total landmass—270,000,000 ha (2,700,000 km^{2}; 1,000,000 mi^{2})—and consists of "swamps, bogs, meadows, forests of different types — including hardwoods and conifers — and the rivers and lakes that tie them all together". It represents 75 per cent of the nation's forests. (Note: According to a 2019 magazine article, with about 80 per cent of the boreal forest intact, which is rare, the Canadian boreal forest "represents 25 per cent of the planet's remaining intact forest, leading the world alongside the Amazon.")

The boreal woodland caribou are half again the size (males average 180 kg, up to 272 kg) of barren-ground caribou (males average 110 kg, up to 153 kg) and smaller than the three western montane ecotypes. They have dark colored fur (only the Selkirk mountain caribou is darker) and their boreal forest habitat stretches from Newfoundland to British Columbia in an irregular distribution. Most boreal woodland caribou are not migratory. The Labrador caribou, which interbred in ancient times with barren-ground caribou, migrate long distances, while and the Torngat Mountains population of Nunavut, Quebec, Newfoundland and Labrador, and the Atlantic-Gaspésie caribou, move with the seasons to different elevations.

In their August 2008 scientific review and, Environment Canada established that in order to monitor and manage the boreal caribou's recovery, they would use "local population range" as the "relevant spatial scale for the identification of critical habitat" because "habitat conditions within boreal caribou ranges affect their survival and reproduction." This includes the spatial configuration, quantity, quality of habitat that local population need to survive. In 2008, there were "57 recognized local populations or units of analysis for Boreal caribou in Canada." The 2008 report described three measurable criteria for monitoring caribou habitat population trend—Declining (D), Stable (S), Increasing (I) or Unknown (U), population size—Very Small, Small, or Above Critical, and range disturbance—Very Low, Low, Moderate, High or Very High.

By 2018, the boreal woodland caribou (more broadly defined than now) had 51 herds

==== Atlantic-Gaspésie caribou ====
In Québec, the small herds of the Atlantic-Gaspésie woodland caribou in the Gaspésie's isolated "alpine habitats on mountain plateaus" are designated on SARA's Schedule 1 as endangered with fewer than 120 adults in 2014 with an anticipated date of extinction of 2056. They were once widespread with a habitat that spanned New Brunswick, Nova Scotia, and Prince Edward Island. Their numbers decreased with development including forest management models that increased the populations of their predators like the Eastern Coyote and black bear.

==== Labrador caribou (R. t. caboti) ====
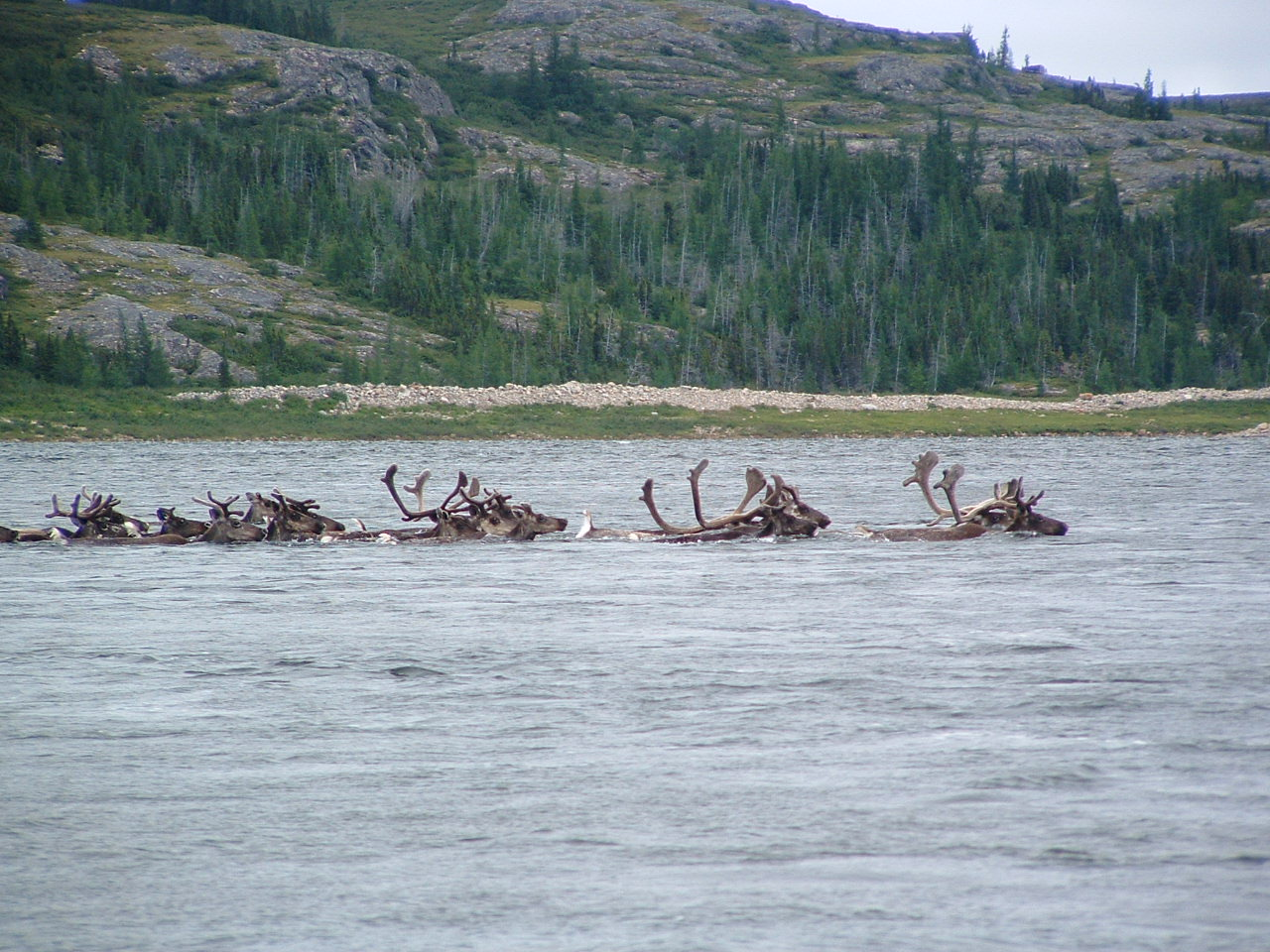
Caribou crossing Leaf River

Labrador ("Eastern migratory") caribou herds include four subpopulations such as the George River herd. The George River caribou are one of four subpopulations of Labrador caribou in northern Canada. The herd's range extends through Labrador and Northern Quebec (Labrador Woodland Caribou Recovery Team, 2004).The George River caribou and the Leaf River caribou, R. t. caboti, migrate between forest and tundra.

In southern Labrador and northeastern Quebec, the range of three herds of the sedentary boreal woodland caribou, R. t. caribou, the Lac Joseph herd (LJH) 59,000 km^{2} (23,000 sq mi), the Red Wine Mountains herd (RWMH) 46,000 km^{2} (18,000 sq mi), and the Mealy Mountains herd (MMH) 28,000 km^{2} (11,000 sq mi) is bounded on the north by the George River herd. In the winter the multiple herds intermingle when the George River herd enters the outer portions of the sedentary caribou ranges. The Lac Joseph-Atikonak Lake area is as a major calving and summering area for the Lac Joseph Woodland Caribou herd.

==== Newfoundland caribou, R. t. terraenovae ====
The population has fluctuated markedly. In 1975 the total was estimated at 22,818; it peaked in 1996 at 93,737 and in 2013 was down to 31,981. In 2014, COSEWIC assessed the status of Newfoundland caribou as Special Concern.

=== Barren-ground caribou, R. t. groenlandicus ===
The most abundant caribou with are the migratory barren-ground caribou which consist of huge herds that migrate annually to and from their natal grounds taking routes that are usually predictable. Barren-ground caribou are "slightly larger and darker". In Canada, major barren-ground herds include the Porcupine caribou herd, Cape Bathurst herd, Bluenose West herd, Bluenose east herd, Bathurst herd, Ahiak herd, and the Dolphin-Union herd. Alaska has four herds of barren-ground caribou. (Note: There are three herds in Alaska, the Western Arctic herd, Teshekpuk herd, and the Central Arctic herd. The Porcupine herd is transnational as its range includes Alaska and northern Canada.)

Because they migrate to the tundra, both the Leaf River herd and George River herd have sometimes been included with the barren-ground caribou, but genetic and other data show them to be woodland caribou that acquired some barren-ground caribou genes early in the Holocene (see Reindeer: Taxonomy). (Note: This animated map created by CircumArctic Rangifer Monitoring and Assessment Network (CARMA), an international group of scientists, managers and community people who have a common interest in caribou, shows caribou herds migrating over the course of a year based on data collected from c. 1990–2006: . Caribou aggregate in June on the calving grounds and data is collected, such as caribou counts, in early July.)

==== Bluenose East-Bathurst caribou ====
The Bluenose East-Bathurst caribou, (southwest of Kugluktuk), are cross-border caribou herds, with migrations that bring them into both Nunavut and the Northwest Territories. In 2016, the Nunavut Wildlife Management Board with the endorsement of the Government of Nunavut developed a "community-based caribou plan" for Kugluktuk that limited harvest to 340 caribou. In 2019, government representatives from Nunavut, the Northwest Territories, Kugluktuk MLA Mila Kamingoak, biologists from the Nunavut and N.W.T., representatives from N.W.T. First Nations groups, Nunavut hunters and trappers organizations including Kugluktuk Hunters and Trappers Organization (HTO) worked together to improve management of the Bluenose East-Bathurst caribou herds. In 2016, although both Nunavut and N.W.T. governments opposed mining exploration on Bluenose East caribou calving grounds, the project went ahead.

Gwich'in in the Northwest Territories have hunted Bluenose East and Bluenose West barren-ground caribou (R. t. granti) herds and the Porcupine caribou herds (R. t. groenlandicus) from time immemorial. The word for caribou in the Gwich'in language, which is part of an Athabaskan language, is tradivadzaih.

==== Bathurst herd ====
The range of the Bathurst caribou herd range "extends straight north from the northern edge of Saskatchewan to the Arctic coast and eastward across the north side of Great Slave Lake.

The Bathurst caribou herd has suffered a dramatic decline from a record number of about 470,000 in the mid-1980s to only 8,200 in 2018. By 2003 there were 186,000 and by 2009 there were 32,000. As a result, the Government of Northwest Territories (GNWT) imposed a hunting ban for resident and outfitter hunters in 2010. The people of Wekweètì were still allowed to hunt a total of 150 animals, until the winter of 2015 when GNWT imposed a total hunting ban for all hunters. As the population continued to decline, the Tłı̨chǫ Government responded by introducing its own ban on hunting the Bathurst herd in October 2015. Caribou hunting is an important channel for the practice of Tłı̨chǫ culture and way of life on the land. The ban on hunting has created much hardship for families who usually rely on caribou as the main food source. Now they need to rely on the monetary system and financial support to buy store bought food."

"Between 2015 and 2018, the number of breeding cows dropped by almost 40 per cent to about 3,000 animals." In a February 2018 Science Advances journal, concerns were raised about the decline of the Bathurst caribou herd caused by disturbance of "key parts" of their range as governments of the Yukon and Northwest Territories have been opening access "for mining exploration and development" since the early 1990s. The mineral exploration "led to the loss and degradation of key habitat for caribou" which has exacerbated the herd's decline. Researchers described the policies that explicitly support private mining interests at the "expense of Indigenous cultures and livelihoods", as a tragedy of "open access". It is "unfolding particularly in the Bathurst caribou range, where caribou numbers are at critically low levels and mining activity has boomed since the early 1990s."

In 2019, the governments of Canada and the Northwest Territories pledged $61 million towards the construction of a 640 kilometre-long road "connecting Yellowknife to the Arctic Coast to open up mining in the Arctic". The road which cuts through thawing permafrost and the calving grounds of the Bathurst caribou herd, will benefit the Chinese state-controlled mining company—MMG Limited.

==== Dolphin-Union caribou ====
According to the official Canadian government site, the Dolphin-Union caribou are unique and while they partially resemble the Peary Caribou, genetically they are Barren-ground Caribou (see Reindeer: Taxonomy).

=== Porcupine Caribou Herd (PCH) ===
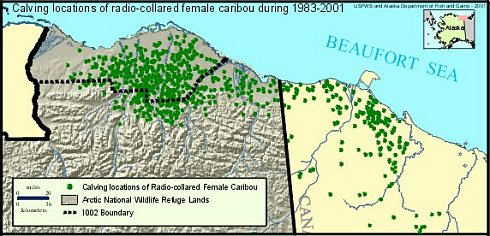
Caribou calving grounds, 1983–2001

The Porcupine Caribou herd (PCH)—formerly R. ogilviensis, now considered a herd of barren-ground caribou, R. t. groenlandicus—in northwest Canada and northeast Alaska migrate 1,500 miles (2,400 km) annually from their winter range in the boreal forests of Alaska and Yukon northwest Canada over the mountains boreal forests to their calving grounds on the Porcupine River coastal plain on the Beaufort Sea. The Bureau of Land Management (BLM) draft 2018 Environmental Impact Statement (EIS) said that in order to reduce the vulnerability of the Porcupine Caribou Herd (PCH) and Central Arctic Herds (CAH) adaptive mitigation had to be undertaken in "[a]ll lands in the Arctic Refuge Coastal Plain are recognized as habitat of the PCH and CAH and would be managed to ensure unhindered movement of caribou through the area."

Caribou calves are born in the first week of June and they are at their most vulnerable from their primary predators on the calving ground – golden eagles, grizzly bears and wolves – during the first three weeks when they are dependent on milk from their mothers. About one quarter of them die during this period.

In February 2019, veteran researchers Don Russell and Anne Gunn, submitted their commissioned report to the Governments of Canada, Yukon Territory and the Northwest Territories—signatories to the 1987 International Treaty for the Porcupine herd. They undertook a "science-based risk assessment for how vulnerable the Porcupine Caribou herd (PCH)" is to the proposed oil and gas development of 1002 lands (Coastal Region) in the Alaska National Wildlife Refuge."

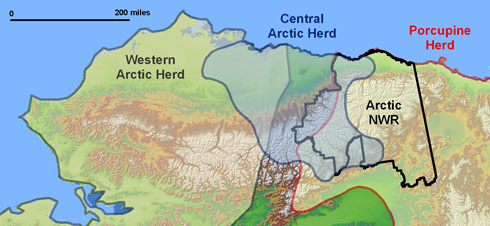
Caribou herd ranges

Porcupine caribou's 1,500 miles (2,400 km) annual land migration between their winter range in the boreal forests of Alaska and northwest Canada over the mountains to the coastal plain and their calving grounds on the Beaufort Sea coastal plain, is the longest of any land mammal on earth. In 2019, the herd size was 218,000 compared 100,000 in the early 1970s.

The Porcupine herd has "supported people for thousands of years as well as being a key driver in the mountain and coastal arctic food web". The herd's annual range is contained within the Arctic National Wildlife Refuge, established in 1980 by the US Congress. The Alaska National Interest Lands Conservation Act (ANILCA) included Section 1002 which "identified a need to assess the oil and gas potential as well as the wildlife values". The 1.57 million acres Coastal Plain had not been included in the ANWR's wilderness designation. In this report we refer to the area covered by Section 1002 of ANILCA as "1002" lands.

=== Peary caribou (R. t. pearyi) ===
The smallest North American caribou are the Peary caribou (R. a. pearyi after a recent revision; formerly R. t. pearyi) that live on the Canadian High Arctic archipelago islands. Their fur is the lightest colour. Habitat suitable for their survival is very limited. The estimated population of the Peary caribou was about 13,000 adults in 2016, according to the Committee on the Status of Endangered Wildlife in Canada, or COSEWIC."

=== Southampton Island Caribou ===
Southampton Island caribou are barren-ground caribou, Rangifer t. groenlandicus. Like Coats Island caribou, they have no predators on the island.

In January 2012, a Government of Nunavut's wildlife biologist, Mitch Campbell, said that the Southampton Island Caribou, on the island at the mouth of Hudson Bay, was threatened with disease and overhunting. Southampton Island caribou numbers "declined from about 30,000 caribou in 1997 to 7,800 caribou in 2011, representing a drop of almost 75%." In July 2012, the Government of Nunavut set an "annual harvest limit of 1,000 caribou" in response to an urgent request from the Coral Harbour Hunters and Trappers Organization (HTO). The hunt has become unsustainable as orders for caribou from the island was being flown as country food to places like Iqaluit. After being hunted to extinction in the 1950s, the herd was "re-established when 50 animals were transplanted there in 1968."

==== Mountain caribou ====
Selkirk Mountain caribou, considered an ecotype of woodland caribou, R. tarandus caribou, comprised 11 local populations in the Selkirk, Monashee and Purcell Ranges of the Columbia Mountain, six of which (South Selkirk, South Purcell, Central Purcell, South Monashee, Kinbasket and Mount Robson) are now extirpated. It is Designated Unit (DU) 9 in COSEWIC assignment of ecotypes. It is listed here under barren-ground caribou because extensive genetic research confirms its Beringian-Eurasian lineage, but distantly, having diverged > 60,000 years ago.

The cross boundary South Selkirk mountain caribou, of distant Beringian-Eurasian lineage (see above), had roamed the southern end of the Selkirk Mountains crossing the border between British Columbia, Canada and northern Idaho, eastern Washington, in the United States. They were the last naturally occurring caribou herd in the contiguous United States.

In 2009 the herd of 50 animals was declining, by April 2018, only three remained, According to David Moskovitz, author of Caribou Rainforest: From Heartbreak to Hope in 2019, the "last member of the last herd to regularly cross into the lower 48 states from Canada", a female, was moved in January 2019, a captive rearing pen near Revelstoke. By 2019, the South Selkirk herd was extirpated (locally extinct). Meanwhile, the Revelstoke maternity pen, beset with adult and calf mortality, was closed the same year and remaining animals moved to another temporary holding facility.

In British Columbia "Herd plans are currently being developed for each of the 54 herds in B.C." These plans include local populations of Selkirk Mountain caribou, Rocky Mountain caribou and Osborn's caribou.

Three related western montane ecotypes that have been found to be of the Beringian-Eurasian lineage are Stone's caribou of Alaska and just into south-eastern Yukon; Osborn's caribou of northern British Columbia and southern Yukon (DU7 in COSEWIC parlance); and Rocky Mountain caribou of the east slope of the Rocky Mountains in British Columbia and Alberta (DU8) (originally described as R. fortidens Hollister, 1912). Dawson's caribou of Haida Gwaii was also of the Beringian-Eurasian lineage. These were all formerly considered ecotypes of woodland caribou, R. tarandus caribou.

== Herds ==
For purposes of management and monitoring, caribou are subdivided into discrete herds/populations and/or designated units.

In a 2011 article entitled, "Northern caribou population trends in Canada", researchers listed herds/populations including 35 northern caribou herds across the Canadian Arctic. Names in the following table reflect the international consensus before the recent revision.

| # | herd/population | subspecies | ecotype | Inuit / First Nations | provinces / territory | size | managed by | Hunt suspended |
|---|---|---|---|---|---|---|---|---|
| 1 | Porcupine | Barren-ground R. t. groenlandicus | migratory | Gwich'in, (ISR: Aklavik, Inuvik, Paulatuk, Tuktoyaktuk) | Alaska, NWT, Nunavut | 218,000 Stable or increasing population | International Porcupine Caribou Board (IPCB) (Note: International Porcupine Caribou Board (IPCB) was established as part of a 1987 agreement between the federal governments of Canada and the United States.) | |
| 2 | Tuktoyaktik Peninsula Herd | Barren-ground R. t. groenlandicus | sedentary | Inuvialuit (ISR) | NWT | 3,000 (2006) 1,500 (2018) | | Suspended 2006– |
| 3 | Cape Bathurst | Barren-ground R. t. groenlandicus | migratory | Inuvialuit (ISR: Aklavik, Inuvik, Paulatuk, Tuktoyaktuk) | NWT | 8,200, down from 20,000 in 2015 | | Suspended 2007– |
| 4 | Bluenose West* | Barren-ground R. t. groenlandicus | migratory | Inuvialuit, Sahtú region, Gwich'in | NWT | 21,000 (2018) | | commercial |
| 5 | Bluenose East | Barren-ground R. t. groenlandicus | migratory | Délı̨nę primary harvesting community in Sahtú region | NWT | 19,300 (2018) down from 39,000 in 2015. | | |
| 6 | Dolphin-Union | Barren-ground R. t. groenlandicus | migratory | Sachs Harbour (Banks Island), Victoria Island (Ulukhaktok), Inuvialuit, Kitikmeot | endemic to Victoria Island (ISR) Kitikmeot region northern mainland (NU) | | locally managed | |
| 7 | Bathurst | Barren-ground R. t. groenlandicus | migratory | ISR (NT) Aklavik, Inuvik, Tuktoyaktuk | Cape Bathurst, NWT | 8,200 (2018) | A Bathurst Caribou Range Plan | Suspended 2014– |
| 8 | Ahiak | Barren-ground R. t. groenlandicus | migratory | Kitikmeot (NU): Gjoa Haven, Umingmaktok, Cambridge Bay; Kivalliq (NU): Arviat, Whale Cove, Rankin Inlet, Baker Lake, Chesterfield Inlet, Repulse Bay, Coral Harbour | Nunavut | | | |
| 9 | Beverly | Barren-ground R. t. groenlandicus | migratory | Kivalliq (NU): Arviat, Whale Cove, Rankin Inlet, Baker Lake, (Note: Inuit from Baker Lake benefit from the "overlapping ranges of five caribou herds (Beverly, Qamanirjuaq, Wager Bay, Lorillard, and Ahiak).") Chesterfield Inlet, Repulse Bay, Coral Harbour | Nunavut | | | |
| 10 | Lorillard | Barren-ground R. t. groenlandicus | sedentary | Kivalliq (NU): Chesterfield Inlet, Baker Lake | Nunavut | Stable or increasing population | | |
| 11 | Qamanirjuaq | Barren-ground R. t. groenlandicus | migratory (Note: There are 7 migratory barren-ground caribou herds across Inuit Nunangat. From east to west they are Cape Bathurst, Bluenose West, Bluenose East, Bathurst, Ahiak, Beverly, and Qamanirjuaq.) | Kivalliq (NU): Chesterfield Inlet, Baker Lake, Arviat (NU) is only near the migration route. | Nunavut | Declining or stable at historic lows | (Note: The Beverly and Qamanirjuaq Caribou Management Board focus on this specific population/herd which crosses multiple boundaries.) | The Qamanirjuaq herd and can only harvest in specific seasons. |
| 12 | Wager Bay | Barren-ground R. t. groenlandicus | sedentary | Kivalliq (NU): Repulse Bay, Baker Lake, Chesterfield Inlet | Nunavut | Stable or increasing population | | |
| 13 | Southampton Island* | Barren-ground R. t. groenlandicus | sedentary | Kivalliq (NU): Coral Harbour, Repulse Bay, Chesterfield Inlet, Rankin Inlet Qikiqtaaluk (NU): Cape Dorset, Baffin Island | Nunavut | 7,500 (2011) down from 30,000 in 1997 | | restricted total allowable harvest (TAH) with quotas |
| 14 | Coats Island | Barren-ground R. t. groenlandicus | sedentary (Note: On Nunavut mainland and ISR mainland there are 5 "major populations of sedentary barren-ground caribou: Tuktoyaktuk Peninsula, Wager Bay, Lorillard, Boothia Peninsula, and North Melville Peninsula". On the southern Arctic islands of Hudson Bay there are 3 populations: Southampton, Coats, and Mansel Island.) | | Coats Island, Nunavut | 900–6000 (1986) | | ban |
| 15 | Mansel Island | Barren-ground R. t. groenlandicus | sedentary | | Mansel Island, Nunavut | | | |
| 16 | Leaf River | Labrador R. t. caboti | migratory | Nunavik communities | Nunatsiavut: Leaf River, Ungava Peninsula | | | Indefinite ban in Nunatsiavut since 2013 |
| 17 | Torngat Mountains | Labrador R. t. caboti | montane woodland caribou | Nunatsiavut (Labrador): Nain; Nunavik (Quebec): Kangiqsualujjuaq | Labrador, Quebec | 1 herd stable or increasing population | | |
| 18 | George River* | Labrador R. t. caboti | migratory | Nunavik; Nunatsiavut; (Labrador): Nain, Hopedale, Makkovik, Postville, Rigolet | | | | Restricted access (harvest quota). Indefinite ban in Nunatsiavut since 2013 |
| 19 | Lac Joseph* | Woodland, R. t. caribou | sedentary woodland caribou (Note: There are 3 "populations of sedentary woodland caribou: in Labrador (Mealy Mountain-Joir River subpopulation, Red Wine-Dominion Lake subpopulation, and Lac Joseph".) | | Labrador | | | Ban in Labrador (provincial land) protects the Lac Joseph population. |
| 20 | Dominion Lake* | Woodland, R. t. caribou | sedentary woodland caribou | | | | | Ban in Labrador (provincial land) protects the Red Wine-Dominion Lake subpopulation. |
| 21 | Red Wine-Dominion Lake subpopulation* | Woodland, R. t. caribou | sedentary woodland caribou | | Labrador | | | Ban in Labrador (provincial land) protects the Red Wine-Dominion Lake subpopulation. |
| 22 | Joir River subpopulation | Woodland, R. t. caribou | sedentary woodland caribou | | | | | |
| 23 | Mealy Mountain-Joir River subpopulation | Woodland, R. t. caribou | sedentary woodland caribou | | Labrador | | | Ban in Labrador (provincial land) protects the Mealy Mountain-Joir River subpopulation. |
| 24 | Ellesmere Island Group | Peary R. t. pearyi (Note: In 2016 aerial spotters saw 14 Peary caribou compared to 17 on Devon Island in 2008.) | insular: short, irregular migrations | Resolute Bay | Nunavut | 581 | Resolute Bay Hunters and Trappers Association | HTA organized "self-regulated harvesting restrictions" (1975–) |
| 25 | Axel Heiberg Island Group | Peary R. t. pearyi (Note: Local populations of Peary caribou occur on the Western Queen Elizabeth Islands (WQEI), Eastern Queen Elizabeth Islands (EQEI), Prince of Wales/Somerset/Boothia (PSB), and Banks/Victoria (BV)) | insular: short, irregular migrations | | Eastern Queen Elizabeth Islands (EQEI), Nunavut | 23 | | |
| 26 | Ringnes Island Group | Peary R. t. pearyi | insular: short, irregular migrations | | Amund Ringnes and Ellef Ringnes, Sverdrup Islands, Nunavut | | | |
| 27 | Melville, Prince Patrick complex | Peary R. t. pearyi | insular: short, irregular migrations | | NWT and Nunavut | 5,500+ adults, up from <1,000 in 1997 | | |
| 28 | Bathurst Island Group | Peary R. t. pearyi | insular: short, irregular migrations | | | | | |
| 29 | Devon Island Group | Peary R. t. pearyi | insular: short, irregular migrations | Inuit | Nunavut | | | |
| 30 | Banks & Northwest Victoria* | Peary R. t. pearyi | insular: short, irregular migrations | | | | | suspended |
| 31 | Prince of Wales & Somerset | Peary R. t. pearyi | insular: short, irregular migrations | | | | | |
| 32 | Boothia Peninsula | Peary R. t. pearyi | sedentary | | | | | |
| 33 | North Baffin* | Barren-ground R. t. groenlandicus | insular: short, irregular migrations | Inuit | Nunavut | | | suspended |
| 34 | Northeast Baffin* | Barren-ground R. t. groenlandicus | insular: short, irregular migrations | Inuit | Nunavut | | | suspended |
| 35 | South Baffin* | Barren-ground R. t. groenlandicus | insular: short, irregular migrations | Inuit | Nunavut | | | suspended |
| 36 | Newfoundland | Newfoundland R. t. terranovae | short, irregular migrations | | Newfoundland | | | |

• The Baffin Island caribou are so different genetically and ecologically that they may qualify as a distinct subspecies of barren-ground caribou, but have not been formally described as such (see Reindeer: Evolution and Reindeer: Taxonomy.

+ Inuvialuit Settlement Region (ISR), Northwest Territories (NT)

== Caribou management and conservation ==
Caribou are included on the Minister of the Environment's List of Wildlife Species at Risk which federally recognizes species with designations ranging from of special concern, threatened, endangered, extirpated, to extinct under Schedule I of the Species at Risk Act (SARA). The list is update annually based on assessments by Committee on the Status of Endangered Wildlife in Canada (COSEWIC) experts and scientists. Caribou populations that are on Schedule 1 and are listed as threatened include the Boreal population in Yukon, Northwest Territories, British Columbia, Alberta, Saskatchewan, Manitoba, Ontario, Quebec, Newfoundland and Labrador. Caribou herds that are listed as endangered and are included on Schedule 1 include the Atlantic-Gaspésie caribou population in Quebec and the Dolphin and Union population in the Northwest Territories and Nunavut. The Barren-ground population in Yukon, Northwest Territories, Nunavut, Alberta, Saskatchewan, and Manitoba are listed as threatened but are not included on Schedule 1. Central Mountain population in British Columbia and Alberta, the Southern Mountain population in British Columbia, the Eastern Migratory population of Manitoba, Ontario, Quebec, Newfoundland and Labrador, and the Torngat Mountains population of Nunavut, Quebec, Newfoundland and Labrador are listed as endangered but are not included on Schedule 1. The Newfoundland population in Newfoundland and Labrador and the Northern Mountain population in the Yukon, Northwest Territories, and British Columbia are listed as Special Concern and are not included on Schedule 1. Dawson's caribou, Rangifer tarandus dawsoni, of British Columbia is extinct.

The April 2018 report by the Auditor General of Canada there are 51 herds of the boreal woodland caribou with 37 of them in decline.

What was once the largest caribou herd in the world with 800,000–900,000 animals, the George River caribou herd (GRCH) in the Ungava Peninsula of Quebec and Labrador in eastern Canada, had declined to 14,200 animals by 2014.

By 2011, the Leaf River Herd (LRH) (Rivière-aux-Feuilles) herd decreased to 430,000 caribou in 2011 and could be threatened with extinction by 2080.

In 2018, the Nunatsiavut government asked Newfoundland-Labrador not to classify the George River and Torngat Mountains caribou herds as endangered because Committee on the Status of Endangered Wildlife in Canada (COSEWIC) used outdated data on the size of the herds.

In a 2018 article, Canadian Geographic listed the declining populations across Canada. These included the Eastern Migratory caribou declining from 1,100,000 to 225,000 and listed as endangered, Newfoundland populations declining from 100,000 to 32,000 listed as special concern, boreal woodland caribou declining at 33,000 listed as threatened, barren ground caribou declining from 2,000,000 to 300,000 listed as threatened, Atlantic-Gaspesie caribou declined from 1,500 to 130 listed as endangered, Torngat Mountains caribou declining from 5,000 to 1,400 listed as endangered, Central mountain declining from 1,300 to 500 listed as endangered, Southern mountain declined from 2,500 to 1,400 listed as endangered, Northern Mountain caribou declining from 48,000 to 43,000 listed as special concern, Dolphin and Union declining from 100,000 to 20,000 listed as endangered, and Peary caribou declining from 50,000 to 13,700 listed as threatened.

== Designated units for conservation and monitoring ==
Names follow international convention prior to the recent revision.

For conservation reasons, caribou populations have been also divided into eleven subsets "designatable units" (DU), which include Barren-Ground, Eastern Migratory, Northern Mountain, Boreal, Newfoundland, Dolphin and Union, Peary, Torngat Mountains, Southern Mountain, Central Mountain Current, Atlantic-Gaspésie. These for the most part line up with previously named subspecies (see Reindeer: Taxonomy).

According to conservation biologist Justina Ray at Wildlife Conservation Society Canada (WCSC), who was a co-leader of a 10-year long study on how these "designatable units" (DU) of caribou should be listed" under the federal Species at Risk Act (SARA), the "change in the caribou's fortunes" is "profoundly worrying" since the last assessment was made in 2004.

Based on data collected between 2014 and 2017, Barren-Ground DU (R. t groenlandicus) had declined to about 800,000 animals from the highest estimate of 2,000,000; the Eastern Migratory DU (R. t. caboti) had declined to c. 225,000 from c. 1,100,000 at its highest; Northern Mountain DU (R. t. osborni), had declined to c.43,000 from c. 48,000, Boreal DU (R. t. caribou, which at that time included the western montane ecotypes that are now recognized as of Beringean-Eurasian lineage, was currently at c. 33,000 animals; Newfoundland DU (R. t. terranovae) had declined to c.32,000 from c. 100,000, Dolphin and Union DU herd of barren-ground caribou declined to c. 20,000 from possibly up to 100,000 (Note: R. M. Anderson, who led two expeditions to the Coronation Gulf in 1908-1912 and 1913-1916, made this estimate of Dolphin-Union caribou as sort of an off-the-cuff remark, based on the immense herds that he saw migrating across the Dolphin and Union Strait, as cited by COSEWIC (2004). His published 1917 paper made no such estimate. It should not be taken as rigorous estimate. The herd has probably never exceeded about 30,000.); Peary DU declined to c. 13,700 from c. 50,000; Torngat Mountains DU decreased to c. 1,400 from to c.5,000, Southern Mountain DU declined to c. 1,400 from c.2,500; Central Mountain DU declined to c. 500 from c. 1,300; Atlantic-Gaspésie DU declined to c. 130 from c. 1,500.

The 2018 assessment was undertaken by an independent body that advises the Government of Canada on the status of endangered wildlife. Ray said that the "conclusions startle even those of us who have been paying a lot of attention." Caribou researchers gathered in Ottawa in October 2018 at a government-sponsored meeting.

Most alarming to scientists is the threat to the "vast herds" of Arctic barren-ground caribou and the Hudson Bay "eastern migratory herds" that were not "considered in trouble 15 years ago". By 2018, the researchers recommended that the government list barren-ground caribou as threatened and the eastern migratory caribou as endangered, "the highest level of threat".

== Migrations ==
Woodland and barren-ground migratory caribou herds usually return to the calving grounds of the females in the herd and are often named after these areas. This is referred to female natal philopatry or natal homing. Examples include the George River caribou herd (GRCH), Leaf River caribou herd (LRCH), Porcupine caribou, R. t. groenlandicus (formerly R. ogilviensis Millais 1915).

== Common indigenous names for caribou ==
Common indigenous names for caribou are Tuktu (Inuvialuit); Qalipu/Xalibu (Mi'kmaq); Minunasawa atikw (Innu); Ahtik/Atik (Cree); Tǫdzi (Tłįchǫ); T'onzi/Tohzi (North Slavey); Vadzaih (Gwichin); Ch'atthaii (Vuntut Gwichin).
