= Woodland caribou =

Woodland caribou may refer to two North American reindeer (Rangifer tarandus) populations:

- Boreal woodland caribou
- Migratory woodland caribou

== See also ==
- Woodland Caribou Provincial Park
