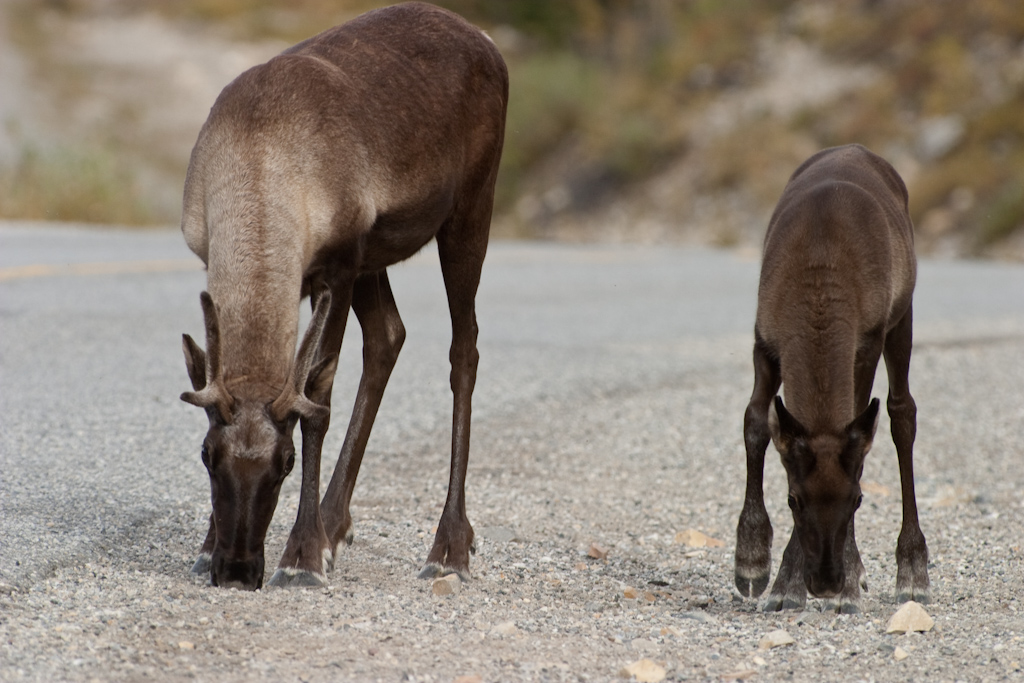
- Female and calf in British Columbia

Scientific classification
- Kingdom: Animalia
- Phylum: Chordata
- Class: Mammalia
- Infraclass: Placentalia
- Order: Artiodactyla
- Family: Cervidae
- Subfamily: Capreolinae
- Genus: Rangifer
- Species: R. tarandus
- Subspecies: R. t. caribou

Trinomial name
- Rangifer tarandus caribou (Gmelin, 1788)
- Approximate range of Rangifer tarandus caribou in dark brown. Overlap with other subspecies of caribou is possible for contiguous range. 1.Rangifer tarandus caribou subdivided into ecotypes: woodland (boreal), woodland (migratory) and woodland (montane), 2. R. t. dawsoni (extinct 1908), 3. R. t. granti, 4. R. t. groenlandicus, 5. R. t. groenlandicus/pearyi, 6. R. t. pearyi

= Migratory woodland caribou =

Caribou

Subspecies of deer

The migratory woodland caribou refers to two herds of Rangifer tarandus (known as caribou in North America) that are included in the migratory woodland ecotype of the subspecies Rangifer tarandus caribou or woodland caribou that live in Nunavik, Quebec, and Labrador: the Leaf River caribou herd (LRCH) and the George River caribou herd (GRCH) south of Ungava Bay. Rangifer tarandus caribou is further divided into three ecotypes: the migratory barren-ground ecotype, the mountain ecotype or woodland (montane) and the forest-dwelling ecotype (boreal woodland caribou). According to researchers, the "George River herd which morphologically and genetically belong to the woodland caribou subspecies, at one time represented the largest caribou herd in the world and migrating thousands of kilometers from boreal forest to open tundra, where most females calve within a three-week period. This behaviour is more like barren-ground caribou subspecies." They argued that "understanding ecotype in relation to existing ecological constraints and releases may be more important than the taxonomic relationships between populations." The migratory George River caribou herd travel thousands of kilometres moving from wintering grounds to calving grounds near the Inuit hamlet of Kangiqsualujjuaq, Nunavik (also known as George River hamlet). In Nunavik and Labrador, the caribou population varies considerably with their numbers peaking in the later decades of each of the 18th, 19th and 20th centuries. In 1984, about 10,000 caribou of the George River herd drowned during their bi-annual crossing of the Caniapiscau River during the James Bay Hydro Project flooding operation. The most recent decline at the turn of the 20th century caused much hardship for the Inuit and Cree communities of Nunavik, who hunt them for subsistence.

While the woodland caribou, Rangifer tarandus caribou (boreal population), boreal woodland caribou or boreal caribou, which is mainly sedentary, was assessed in May 2002 as threatened by the Committee on the Status of Endangered Wildlife in Canada (COSEWIC), not all herds and populations are endangered. For example, the Gros Morne National Park sedentary herd in insular Newfoundland is not endangered.

== Ecotypes ==
=== Subspecies and ecotypes ===
The subspecies of caribou (Rangifer tarandus), a medium-sized ungulate, inhabit boreal, montane and Arctic environments and "exhibit tremendous variation in ecology, genetics, behaviour and morphology." Most are found in Canada. Current classifications of Rangifer tarandus, either with prevailing taxonomy on subspecies, designations based on ecotypes, or natural population groupings, fail to capture "the variability of caribou across their range in Canada" needed for effective species conservation and management. "Across the range of a species, individuals may display considerable morphological, genetic, and behavioural variability reflective of both plasticity and adaptation to local environments."

In eastern North America caribou are classified into three ecotypes – "the mountain caribou which is found south of the St. Lawrence River, the barren-ground caribou which calves in the tundra, and in between, the forest-dwelling ecotype which lives all year long in the boreal forest."

In west-central Alberta there are two ecotypes – boreal and mountain.

In Québec there are three ecotypes with specific habitats and behaviour – the migratory barren-ground ecotype, the mountain ecotype and the forest-dwelling ecotype (boreal woodland caribou). In British Columbia caribou are classified into three ecotypes – mountain, northern and boreal. In Ontario caribou are classified into two ecotypes – forest-dwelling woodland caribou and forest-tundra woodland caribou. In Newfoundland and Labrador, woodland caribou are classified as part of the boreal population of caribou, which is subdivided into two ecotypes: the migratory forest-tundra and the sedentary forest-dwelling ecotype.

== Taxonomy ==
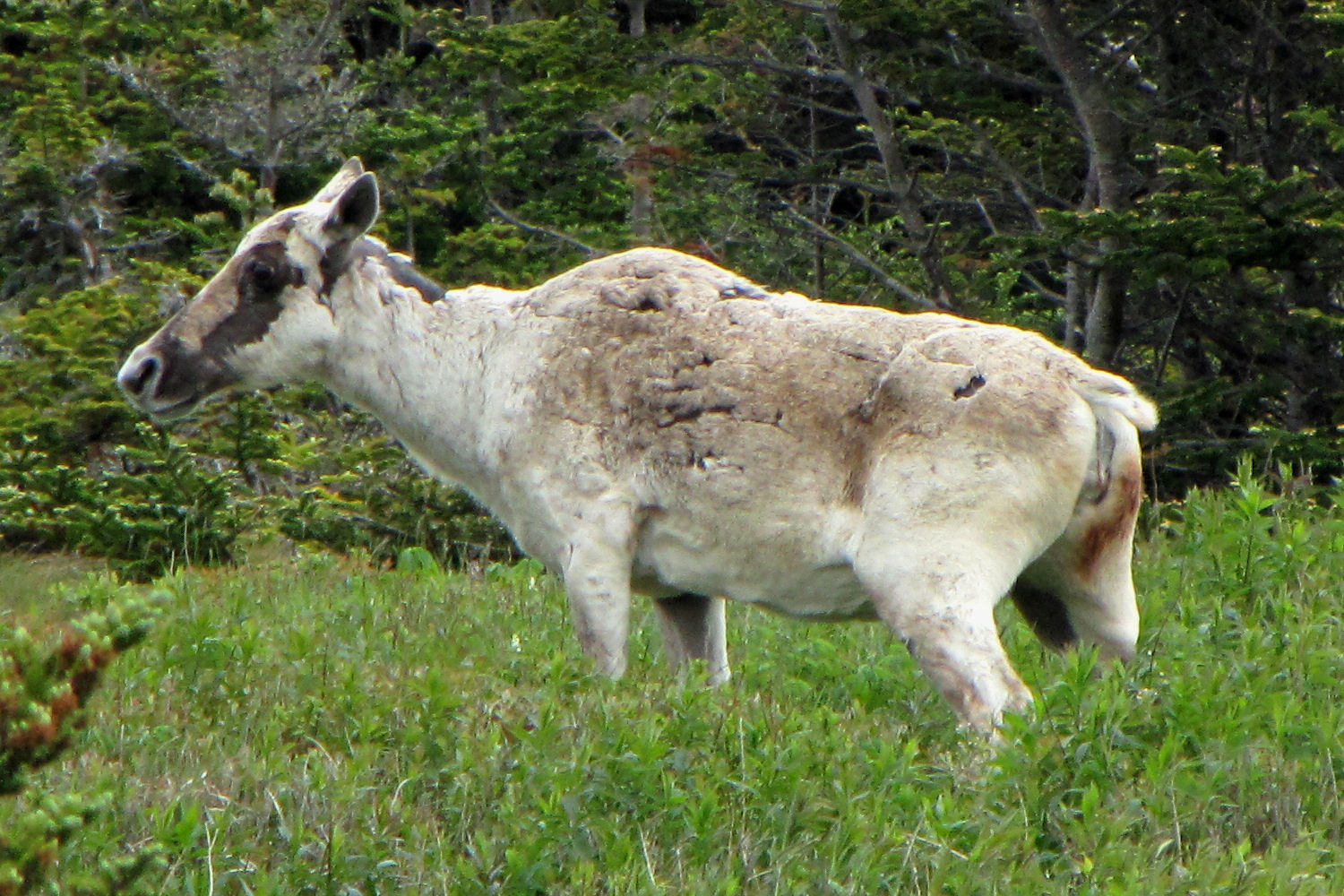
Female in spring, Newfoundland

The species taxonomic name Rangifer tarandus (reindeer or caribou) was defined by Carl Linnaeus in 1758. The subspecies taxonomic name, Rangifer tarandus caribou was defined by Gmelin in 1788.

According to the then-Canadian Wildlife Service Chief Mammalogist, Frank Banfield, in his often-cited A Revision of the Reindeer and Caribou, Genus Rangifer (1961), R. t. caboti (the Labrador caribou), R. t. osborni (Osborn's caribou (from British Columbia)) and R. t. terraenovae (the Newfoundland caribou) were considered invalid and included in R. t. caribou.

Some recent authorities have considered them all valid, even suggesting that they are quite distinct. In their book entitled Mammal Species of the World, American zoologist Don E. Wilson and DeeAnn Reeder agree with Valerius Geist, specialist on large North American mammals, that this range actually includes several subspecies. (Note: The Integrated Taxonomic Information System list Wilson and Geist on their experts panel.)

Geist (2007) argued that the "true woodland caribou, the uniformly dark, small-manned type with the frontally emphasized, flat-beamed antlers", which is "scattered thinly along the southern rim of North American caribou distribution" has been incorrectly classified. He affirms that the "true woodland caribou is very rare, in very great difficulties and requires the most urgent of attention."

In 2005, an analysis of mtDNA found differences between the caribou from Newfoundland, Labrador, southwestern Canada and southeastern Canada, but maintained all in R. t caribou.

Mallory and Hillis argued that, "Although the taxonomic designations reflect evolutionary events, they do not appear to reflect current ecological conditions. In numerous instances, populations of the same subspecies have evolved different demographic and behavioural adaptations, while populations from separate subspecies have evolved similar demographic and behavioural patterns..."[U]nderstanding ecotype in relation to existing ecological constraints and releases may be more important than the taxonomic relationships between populations."

A recent taxonomic revision of the genus Rangifer resurrects woodland caribou as Rangifer caribou, Arctic caribou as Rangifer arcticus, and Greenland caibou as Rangifer groenlandicus. The reasons for this are that (1) Greenland caribou are the most genetically divergent of all caribou and reindeer, with an average microsatellite genetic difference (Fixation Index) of F_{ST} = 44% from all others, justifying species status as originally named, Rangifer groenlandicus; it also has morphological and behavioral differences from barren-ground caribou (for example, they are "mixed migrators" (some migrate short distances and some do not, and they lack the aggregated rutting and post-calving and synchronized calving of barren-ground caribou); (2) the woodland caribou lineage diverged from other caribou in mid-Pleistocene, 300,000 to 357,000 years ago, not during the last glacial maximum (LGM: 23,000 to 19,000 years ago) as previously assumed and more likely descended from an earlier North American forest reindeer species such as Torontoceros [Rangifer] hypogaeus, (meaning that it cannot be the same species as barren-ground caribou because they do not share a direct common ancestor) and it has a different mating system (harem defense and dispersed calving vs. individual mate-tending, aggregated rutting and post-calving and synchronized calving of barren-ground caribou, resulting in antler architecture designed for combat rather than for display); these differences and its genetic distance from other caribou justify return to species status, R. caribou; (3) the above resulted in Arctic caribou reverting to the name given by Richardson (1829): Rangifer arcticus, representing a Beringian-Eurasian lineage (BEL); (4) Genetic analysis confirmed earlier assignments based on morphological measurements that placed the four western montane ecotypes in the BEL lineage, but distantly, having diverged > 60,000 years ago—before the modern ecotypes had evolved their cold- and darkness-adapted physiologies and mass-migration and aggregation behaviors (see Croitor, 2018—requiring their former names to be restored: Selkirk mountain caribou, R. a. montanus, Rocky Mountain caribou, R. a. fortidens, Osborn's caribou, R. a. osborni and Stone's caribou, R. a. stonei. As years of molecular analyses had shown the Eastern Migratory population to be of woodland caribou ancestry, albeit with ancient introgression from barren-ground caribou, their name R. caribou caboti Allen, 1914 was restored. See Reindeer: Evolution and Reindeer: Taxonomy for more detail.

== Québec ==
All caribou of the province of Québec were assigned to the same subspecies (Rangifer tarandus caribou) in 1961. Banfield classified the caribou of Ungava as woodland caribou (R. t. caribou) based on skull measurements.

In Québec there are three ecotypes with specific habitats and behaviour. Bergerud, et al.; compared the sedentary ecotype caribou (Bergerud 1988) in southern Ungava (south of 55°N) to those farther north, the migratory ecotype Leaf River caribou herd (LRH) and the George River caribou herd (GRCH). In southern Ungava caribou females disperse from other females to avoid predators.

1. The barren-ground ecotype, the only migratory form, is found north of the 52nd parallel. This ecotype currently occupies 255,000 km^{2} in fall and winter, mainly in the ecological subzones of the forest-tundra and the taiga. The barren-ground caribou was characterized by a very low abundance from the end of the 19th century until the mid-1950s, but increased markedly thereafter, reaching over a million individuals at the beginning of the 1990s.
2. The mountain ecotype have been identified in the southeastern and, possibly, in the northeastern parts of the province. The latter mountain population is virtually unknown. The southeastern population is sedentary and uses mainly the boreal forest. This population has decreased over the last century and currently numbers only 140 individuals.
3. The forest-dwelling ecotype is found discontinuously, mainly between the 49th and 55th parallels. Its current distribution covers 235,000 km^{2}, mainly east of the 72nd meridian. This sedentary ecotype is found almost exclusively in the boreal forest, principally in areas with long forest fire cycles. Its abundance has also decreased over the years. Large forest-dwelling populations still persisted during the 1950s and 1960s, but they apparently disappeared. The current abundance is not known precisely, but based on density estimates and considering the current distribution, it probably does not exceed 3,000 individuals. Current data are insufficient to identify precisely the causes of the population decline, although hunting seems to be an important proximal cause.

=== Distribution and abundance of caribou in Québec ===
In the late 19th century, the southern limit of caribou distribution in Québec receded northwards and there was a decrease in the number of caribou east of the 62nd meridian until the 1970s. By 2003 there were only four small populations south of the 49th parallel.

In 2001 there were more than one million caribou in Nunavik. By 2011 there were fewer than 300,000.

=== Leaf River caribou herd (LRCH) ===
The Leaf River caribou herd in the west, near the coast of Hudson Bay, has grown from 270,000 individuals in 1991 to 628,000 in 2001. According to the Québec's Natural Resources and Wildlife survey, the Leaf River herd (LRH) (Rivière-aux-Feuilles) had decreased to 430,000 caribou in 2011.

=== George River caribou herd (GRCH) ===
The dramatic decline in numbers of the George River caribou herd has raised concerns. (Note: The Species at Risk Act and Environment Canada do not include the Ungava caribou herds as part of the boreal woodland caribou herds.) In the 1980s there were between 700,000 and 800,000 in the George River herd migrating between northern Québec and Labrador. By 2010 there were 74,000. By 2012 the numbers dropped to 27,600 and by 2014 there were only 14,200.

The "George River herd which morphologically and genetically belong to the woodland caribou subspecies, at one time represented the largest caribou herd in the world and migrating thousands of kilometres from boreal forest to open tundra, where most females calve within a three-week period. This behaviour is more like barren-ground caribou subspecies." They argued that "understanding ecotype in relation to existing ecological constraints and releases may be more important than the taxonomic relationships between populations."

According to a National Geographic Daily News article, the George River caribou herd (GRCH) (Rivière-George) numbered only 3,500 animals in the late 1940s. In 1958 the George River herd was estimated to be numbered at 15,000. By 1988, it was the largest herd in the world with a population of 700,000 and by 1993 the numbers rose to 775,000 animals. By 2001, the herd was at 385,000 animals and continuing to decrease, totaling 75,000 animals in 2010. The most recent survey puts the herd size at fewer than 28,000. The George River herd, south of Ungava Bay, whose numbers reached about 800,000 towards 1993, had about 384,000 individuals in 2001.

In January 2013 the Innu, Inuit and Cree of Québec and Nunatsiavut, NunatuKavut and the Innu of Labrador formed the Ungava Peninsula Caribou Aboriginal Round Table (Note: (the Inuit of Nunavik, the Inuit of Nunatsiavut, the NunatuKavut Community Council, the Naskapi Nation of Kawawachikamach, the Grand Council of the Crees of Eeyou Istchee/Cree Regional Authority (GCCEI/CRA), the Innu Nation of Labrador and all the Innu communities from the Québec region)) held emergency meetings and issued a joint statement. in respond to the "critical decline" of the George River caribou herd (GRCH) and the "uncertain future" of the Leaf River caribou herd (LRCH) and Torngat caribou herds.

The land is changing and the impacts of climate change, industrial development, and the growing human population and easier accessibility of the herd cannot be ignored in the management actions to be put forward. With the exponential rate of development, the protection of caribou habitat is greatly deficient and needs to be addressed seriously.

— Ungava Peninsula Caribou Aboriginal Round Table

The Government of Nunatsiavut recommended that the "George River caribou calving grounds by designating a 14,000 km^{2} protection zone under the Regional Land Use Plan for the Labrador Inuit Settlement Area."

GRCH
| year | population |
|---|---|
| late 1940s | 3,500 |
| 1958 | 15,000 |
| 1988 | 700,000 |
| mid-1990s | 750,000 |
| 2001 | 385,000 |
| 2011 | 74,000 |
| 2012 | 27,600 |
| 2014 | 14,200 |

==== Distribution ====
The migratory George River caribou herd travel thousands of kilometres moving from wintering grounds to calving grounds near the Inuit hamlet of Kangiqsualujjuaq, Nunavik (also known as George River hamlet).

Caribou generally travel upwards of 2,000 kilometres (1,200 mi) annually and live in an area of about 1,000,000 square kilometres (390,000 sq mi). Some individuals have been observed traveling 6,000 kilometres (3,700 mi) in a single year.

The caribou population varies considerably, for unknown reasons, and their numbers have apparently peaked in the later decades of each of the 18th, 19th and 20th centuries. The most recent decline at the turn of the 20th century caused much hardship for the Inuit and Cree communities of Nunavik, who hunt them for subsistence. By 1950, as few as 5000 caribou remained in northern Québec and Labrador.

=== Caribou drownings at Calcaire (Limestone) Falls in 1984 ===
In late September 1984, about 115 kilometres (71 mi) south of the northern village of Kuujjuaq, Québec, about 10,000 caribou (appr. 2% of the George River herd) drowned while crossing the Caniapiscau River, immediately above the Calcaire (Limestone) Falls. The Caniapiscau River confluences with the Larch River downstream from Calcaire (Limestone) Falls to create the Koksoak River that flows into southern Ungava Bay. Although the caribou regularly criss-cross northern rivers and lakes and can swim 10 km at a stretch, northern rivers and lakes often claim lives during their annual migrations. At the time of the accident, observers raised questions about Hydro-Québec's management of the newly built reservoir on the headwaters of the Caniapiscau River, some 450 kilometres (280 mi) upstream, and focused their attention on decisions made in the days following the exceptionally heavy rains in September 1984. The Caniapiscau Reservoir is part of the James Bay Project in northern Québec. The waters of the upper Caniapiscau River, which flow north, were diverted into the La Grande River of the James Bay watershed to the west.

The dead caribou drifting and beginning to accumulate along the eastern shore line of the Koksoak River were first noted by the residents of Kuujjuaq, but the cause of the deaths was not confirmed until a team of wildlife biologists and technicians from the Newfoundland-Labrador Wildlife Division arrived by helicopter to participate in a joint cooperative effort with the Québec Recreation, Hunting and Fishing Department to live capture and radio collar caribou swimming across the Koksoak River. Kuujjuaq residents, who were familiar with the river, reported seasonal water levels far higher than normally recorded in recent history. Autumn boat stages, shore line cabin sites and tributary beaver lodges were being flooded. While the dead caribou were thought to have drowned, confirmation was not determined until the Newfoundland-Labrador Wildlife Division used the helicopter to trace the increasingly larger accumulations of floating dead caribou back approximately 115 km upstream from Kuujjuaq to the base of Calcaire (Limestone) Falls on the Caniapiscau River. Coves and backwater were choked with the floating carcasses of dead caribou, with accumulations becoming increasingly larger in approaching the base of the Falls.

Subsequent investigation by the Québec Recreation, Hunting and Fishing Department—whose employees had also observed the dead caribou along the Koksoak River on 30 September—attempted to conclude that a larger number of caribou would have perished had the Caniapiscau Reservoir not yet been built, since the water flow at the falls would have been even greater in the absence of the reservoir. Hydro-Québec and SEBJ took this position, but Kuujjuaq hunters and others rejected it. Fikret Berkes wrote in 1988 that "the dispute is unlikely ever to be resolved."

In a short analysis, Québec's Indian and Inuit Secretariat (SIGMAI) expressed the opinion that the fast-growing George River herd may have become accustomed to the reduced water flow from 1981 to 1984, during which time the reservoir was being filled. SIGMAI hypothesizes that the caribou may have been surprised as the water flow of the Caniapiscau River was partially restored to its natural state in mid-September 1984, after the filling of reservoir had been completed. The partial release of the headwaters back into the Caniapiscau was necessary because the power stations on the La Grande River could not yet turbine the full water flow. According to Hydro-Québec, any major addition of water to the La Grande River would by necessity have been diverted around the power stations for months, even years, and seriously damage the floodgates which were designed for temporary use during exceptional climatic events.

Thus, SIGMAI chastised the Société d'énergie de la Baie James, a subsidiary of Hydro-Québec, that had just completed the construction of the reservoir, for not having planned to actively manage the restored water flow to the Caniapiscau River in such a way as to protect the caribou herd from exceptional floods caused by heavy rains or rapid spring thaw. This was a rather novel idea at the time, as no Canadian wildlife expert had foreseen anything more than the usual mortality along the rivers of the region (up to 500 deaths every year).

The Québec game officials did, however, put forward the opinion that a dynamic management of the water levels and flows of the Caniapiscau Reservoir could have avoided the high mortality observed in September 1984, either completely, or at least reduced it to levels observed in recent years. SIGMAI finally recommended that the water levels of the reservoir be lowered by about 0.5 metres (1 ft 8 in) for several months of the year to avoid the use of the flood gates during extreme rainfalls when the caribou are migrating in late summer and early fall. This is largely a moot point today, since virtually no water has been diverted back into the lower Caniapiscau since 1985. Furthermore, a fence was installed to divert the herd from the danger zone near the Calcaire Falls.

=== Direct and indirect effects of landscape disturbance ===
Human-caused landscape disruption is the chief cause of caribou range recession. For example, the conversion of forests by logging may result in greater abundance of other ungulates, like moose, and increased predation by wolves. Linear corridors, such as roads, utility corridors, and trails may improve travel speed and hunting efficiency for predators, improve access for poachers, and hinder caribou movements.

Clearcutting, which is the dominant form of logging in Canada, has been identified as the strongest predictor of caribou extirpation. By replacing primary forests with plantations, clearcutting removes many lichens, a primary food source for caribou, because lichens take many decades to grow, by which time, the plantations are re-cut.

This effect can be demonstrated by the northern front of forest harvesting in Ontario closely matching the southern boundary of continuous caribou occupancy. However, there appears to be a time lag between forest harvest and disappearance of caribou. Research suggests that there is a two-decade time lag between disturbance by forest harvest and disappearance of caribou. Forest harvest converts forest stands to early seral stages, which are favoured by moose, which in turn can support a higher wolf population than caribou alone. A higher wolf population may increase predation mortality of caribou. Thus, two decades is likely the time necessary for these faunal changes to take place.

This time lag is cause for concern, as there is overlap of forest harvest with the southern boundary of caribou range in Ontario. Caribou in these areas are very likely to vanish in the next 20 years. While patterns of forest harvest show the strongest relationship with caribou extirpation in Ontario, strong correlations among landscape disturbances suggest that no single variable can be unequivocally implicated as key to caribou range recession.

Logging also is a major cause of caribou mortality. Logging the mature boreal forest of northern Minnesota, Wisconsin, Michigan and Ontario has led to creeping aspen/birch habitat, followed by northward-moving white-tailed deer carrying the parasite Parelaphostrongylus tenuis. The neurological parasite is fatal to caribou and moose.

Woodland caribou persistence in Ontario will likely depend on the availability of large tracts of old growth forest situated at great distances from anthropogenic disturbance. Recent research suggests that forest harvest operations should be buffered from caribou habitat by at least 13 km.

Climate change may have negative potential for woodland caribou as well. Climate change may further alter forest structure to favour moose and white-tailed deer, which may carry the parasite Parelaphostrongylus tenuis; lethal to caribou but not harmful to other deer. In addition, increased episodes of freezing rain in the winter may make it difficult for caribou to dig through the snow to reach their primary food source, lichens. The effects of climate change on woodland caribou have not been studied.

== Woodland caribou in the United States ==
"At the time of European settlement of North America, caribou (Rangifer tarandus) were found over most of Canada and Alaska. Woodland caribou (R. t. caribou) extended south to 42 degrees N and were found in parts of New England, New York, the Upper Great Lakes states, Montana, Idaho and Washington. By the 1970s, woodland caribou had been eliminated from the eastern United States and most of eastern Canada, extending only to approximately 48 degrees N . The decline extended to the west as well and by 1980 only 25-30 animals persisted in northern Idaho and northeastern Washington; caribou had been extirpated elsewhere in the contiguous 48 states. This population was listed as endangered in 1984 under the Endangered Species Act (ESA). At that time, the entire woodland caribou population in the Selkirks consisted of one herd of 20-25 animals that occurred in extreme northeast Washington, northern Idaho and the Stagleap Park area of British Columbia (B.C.)."

In the United States, the woodland caribou is one of the most critically endangered mammals, with only a few woodland caribou found south of the Canada border each year. In the US there is only one naturally occurring herd of woodland caribou in extreme northern Idaho, northern Montana, eastern Washington and British Columbia, Canada, of about 40 animals. There is, however, a concerted effort on the part of the North Central Caribou Corporation and the Boundary Waters Canoe Area Wilderness to reintroduce a herd of around 75 animals from the Slate Islands in Lake Superior to northern Minnesota. However, the high incidence of white-tailed deer and wolves in the region will likely prove quite problematic.
