= Alexander William Francis Banfield =

Canadian mammalogist and biologist (1918–1996)

- Born: March 12, 1918; Toronto, Ontario
- Died: March 8, 1996 (aged 77); St. Catharines, Ontario
- Other names: Frank Banfield, A.W.F. Banfield
- Occupations: wildlife biologist; naturalist; author; university professor (co-founder (with urban planner Robert Hoover) of the Institute of Urban and Environmental Studies at Brock University, one of the first interdisciplinary environmental studies programs in Canada.
- Organization(s): National Museum of Canada; Canadian Wildlife Service (CWS) Ottawa, Ontario, Canada
- Known for: Arctic mammalogist mammalogist

Alexander William Francis Banfield, Frank Banfield, A. W. F, Banfield (March 12, 1918 – March 8, 1996), was one of the small group of early Canadian mammalogists who worked with Canadian Wildlife Service (CWS) and the National Museum of Canada. His research and publications appeared repeatedly in publications on mammals in Canada. and in 1974 he published his book Mammals of Canada. His 1961 article "A Revision of the Reindeer and Caribou, Genus Rangifer" in the National Museum of Canada's Bulletin continues to be widely cited today in discussions on subspecies and ecotypes of caribou.

== Canadian Wildlife Service ==
In 1948, in his first year as Chief Mammalogist of the newly formed Canadian Wildlife Service, with limited resources, Banfield undertook an ambitious "multi-year investigation into the status, range, and general ecology of the Barren-ground Caribou" which he coordinated and launched. This resulted in his 1951 publication "The Barren-ground Caribou."

== Banfield's classification of Rangifer tarandus caribou questioned ==
Based on Banfield's often-cited A Revision of the Reindeer and Caribou, Genus Rangifer (1961), R. t. caboti (Labrador Caribou), R. t. osborni (Osborn's Caribou—from British Columbia) and R. t. terraenovae (Newfoundland Caribou) were considered invalid and included in R. t. caribou.

Some recent authorities have considered them all valid, even suggesting that they are quite distinct. In their book entitled Mammal Species of the World, American zoologist Don E. Wilson and DeeAnn Reeder agree with Valerius Geist, specialist on large North American mammals, that this range actually includes several subspecies.

Geist (2007) argued that the "true" woodland caribou, the "uniformly dark, small-manned type with the frontally emphasized, flat-beamed antlers", which is "scattered thinly along the southern rim of North American caribou distribution" has been incorrectly classified. He affirms that "true woodland caribou is very rare, in very great difficulties and requires the most urgent of attention."

In 2005, an analysis of mtDNA found differences among the caribou from Newfoundland, Labrador, south-western Canada and south-eastern Canada, but maintained all in R. t caribou.

Mallory and Hillis argued that, "Although the taxonomic designations reflect evolutionary events, they do not appear to reflect current ecological conditions. In numerous instances, populations of the same subspecies have evolved different demographic and behavioural adaptations, while populations from separate subspecies have evolved similar demographic and behavioural patterns... "[U]nderstanding ecotype in relation to existing ecological constraints and releases may be more important than the taxonomic relationships between populations."

== Selected publications ==
- Banfield, Frank (1949). The present status of North American caribou. Transcription. Fourteenth North American Wildlife Conference 1949. pp. 477–491.
- Banfield, Frank (1950), "Caribou investigation", Canadian Geographic Journal, 40 (1): 48–51
- Banfield, Frank (1951a), The barren-ground caribou, Ottawa, Ontario: Canada Department of Resources and Development, pp. 56 + vi fig., 8 maps (Mimeographed.
- 1951b. Notes on the mammals of the Mackenzie District, Northwest Territories. Arctic 4 (2): 112-121, 4 fig., 1 map.
- 1952. Report on caribou investigations in the Canadian Arctic, 1948-50. Polar Record 6 (44): 532-534. (Apparently a summary of Banfield, 1951a.)
- 1954. Preliminary investigation of the barren ground caribou. Part 1. Former and present distribution, migrations, and status. Part 2. Life history, ecology, and utilization. Canada Dept. Northern Affairs and National Resources, National Parks Branch, Canadian Wildlife Service, Wildlife Management Bull., ser. 1, 10A: [2]+79, 5 fig., 12 maps; 10B: [2]+112, 30 fig., 1 map. (Not seen until after the present report had gone to press.)
- Banfield, A.W.F. (1961), "A Revision of the Reindeer and Caribou, Genus Rangifer", Bulletin, 177 (66), Biological Services National Museum of Canada evolution, taxonomy, In Caribou
- Banfield, A.W.F. 1974. Mammals of Canada. University of Toronto Press. Toronto, Ontario. 438 pp.
