= Ecotype =

Classification of distinct populations lesser than subspecies

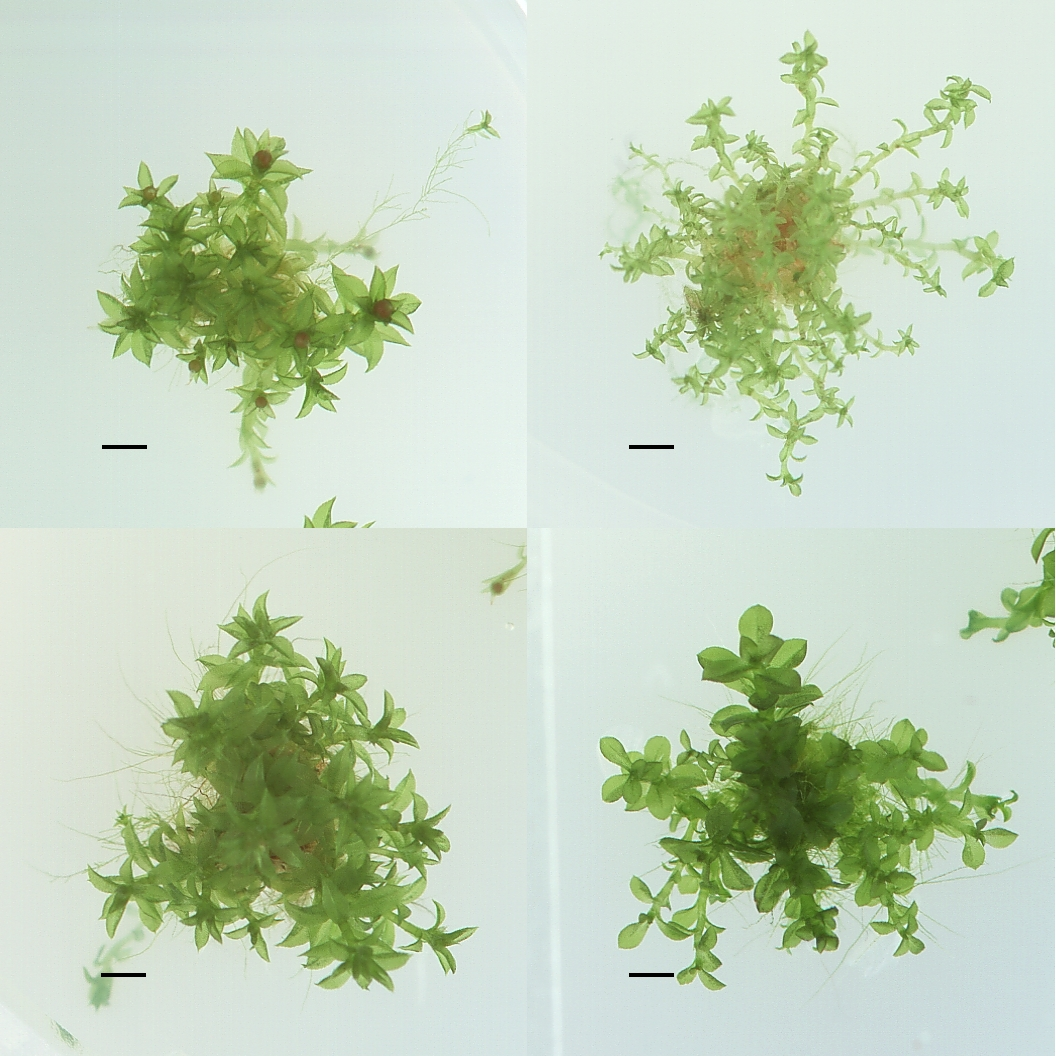
Different ecotypes of Physcomitrella patens

Ecotypes, or ecospecies, are organisms which belong to the same species but possess different phenotypical features as a result of environmental factors such as elevation, climate and predation. Ecotypes can be seen in wide geographical distributions and may eventually lead to speciation.

== Definition ==
In evolutionary ecology, an ecotype, (Note: Greek: οίκος = home and τύπος = type, coined by Göte Turesson in 1922) sometimes called ecospecies, describes a genetically distinct geographic variety, population, or race within a species, which is genotypically adapted to specific environmental conditions.

Typically, though ecotypes exhibit phenotypic differences (such as in morphology or physiology) stemming from environmental heterogeneity, they are capable of interbreeding with other geographically adjacent ecotypes without loss of fertility or vigor.

== Summary ==
An ecotype refers to organisms which belong to the same species but have different phenotypical characteristics as a result of their adaptations to different habitats. Differences between these two groups is attributed to phenotypic plasticity and are too few for them to be termed as wholly different species. Emergence of variants of the same species may occur in the same geographical region where different habitats provide distinct ecological niches for these organisms. Examples of these habitats include meadows, forests, swamps, and sand dunes. Where similar ecological conditions occur in widely separated places, it is possible for a similar ecotype to occur in the separated locations. An ecotype is different from a subspecies, which may exist across a number of different habitats. In animals, ecotypes owe their differing characteristics to the effects of a very local environment which has been hypothesized to lead to speciation through the emergence of reproductive barriers. Therefore, ecotypes have no taxonomic rank.

== Terminology ==
Ecotypes are closely related to morphs or polymorphisms which is defined as the existence of distinct phenotypes among members of the same species. Another term closely related is genetic polymorphism; and it is when species of the same population display variation in a specific DNA sequence, i.e. as a result of having more than one allele in a gene's locus.. In order to be classified as such, morphs must occupy the same habitat at the same time and belong to a panmictic population (whose members can all potentially interbreed). Polymorphism are maintained in populations of species by natural selection. In fact, Begon, Townsend, and Harper assert that

There is not always clear distinction between local ecotypes and genetic polymorphisms.

The notions "form" and "ecotype" may appear to correspond to a static phenomenon, however; this is not always the case. Evolution occurs continuously both in time and space, so that ecotypes or forms may qualify as distinct species in a few generations. Begon, Townsend, and Harper offer the following analogy:

... the origin of a species, whether allopatric or sympatric, is a process, not an event. For the formation of a new species, like the boiling of an egg, there is some freedom to argue about when it is completed.

Thus ecotypes and morphs can be thought of as precursory steps of potential speciation.

== Range and distribution ==
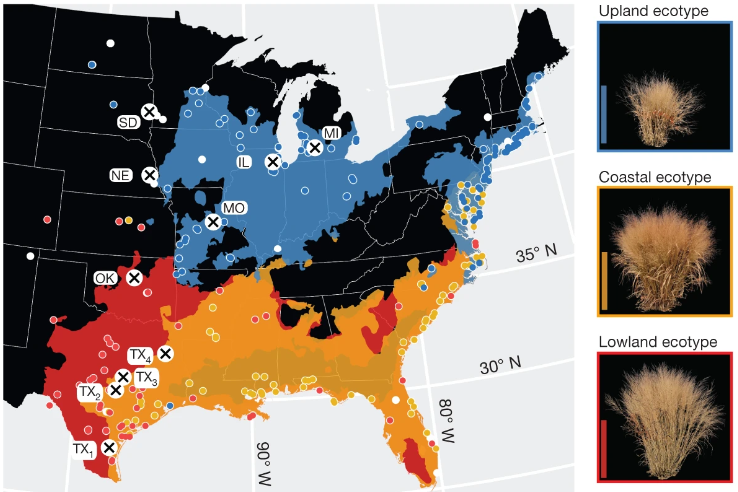
Panicum virgatum ecotypes and their distribution in North America

Research indicates that sometimes ecotypes manifest when separated by great geographical distances as a result of genetic drift that may lead to significant genetic differences and hence variation. Ecotypes may also emerge from local adaptation of species occupying small geographical scales (<1 km), in such cases divergent selection due to selective pressure as a result of differences in microhabitats drive differentiation. Hybridization among populations may increase population gene flow and reduce the effects of natural selection.Hybridization here is defined as when different but adjacent varieties of the same species (or generally of the same taxonomic rank) interbreed, which helps overcome local selection. However other studies reveal that ecotypes may emerge even at very small scales (of the order of 10 m), within populations, and despite hybridization.

In ecotypes, it is common for continuous, gradual geographic variation to impose analogous phenotypic and genetic variation, a situation which leads to the emergence of clines. A well-known example of a cline is the skin color gradation in indigenous human populations worldwide, which is related to latitude and amounts of sunlight. Ecotypes may display two or more distinct and discontinuous phenotypes even within the same population. Ecological systems may have a species abundance that can be either bimodal or multimodal. Emergence of ecotypes may lead to speciation and can occur if conditions in a local environment change dramatically through space or time.

== Ecotype and speciation ==
Just as sunlight can appear as a dim crack in the sky before clouds part, the coarse boundaries of ecotypes may appear as a separation of principle[sic] component clusters before speciation.

— David B. Lowry, "Ecotypes and the controversy over stages in the formation of new species", Biological Journal of the Linnean Society.

The birth of the term 'ecotype' originally came from early interest in understanding speciation. Darwin argued that species evolved through natural selection from variations within population which he termed as 'varieties'. Later on, through a series of experiments, Turresson studied the effect of the environment on heritable plant variation and came up with the term 'ecotype' to denote differences between groups occupying distinct habitats. This, he argued, was a genotypical response of plants to habitat type and it denotes a first step toward isolating reproductive barriers that facilitate the emergence of 'species' via divergence and, ultimately, genetic isolation. In his 1923 paper, Turesson states that variation among species in a population is not random, rather, it is driven by environmental selection pressure. For example, the maturity of Trifolium subterraneum, a clover which was found to correlate to moisture condition; when sown in low rainfall areas of Adelaide, after a few years the population would consist of genotypes that produced seeds early in the season (early genotype), however in higher rainfall areas the clover population would shift to mid-season genotypes. According to Gregor (1944), differences among populations of Trifolium subterraneum arise in response to the selective action of the habitat. These adaptive differences are hereditary and emerge in response to specific environmental conditions. Heritable differences are a key feature in ecotypic variation. Ecotypic variation is a result of particular environmental trends. Individuals, which are able to survive and reproduce successfully pass on their genes to the next generation and establish a population best adapted to the local environment. Ecotypic variation is therefore described to have a genetic base, and are brought about by interactions between an individual's genes and the environment.

An example of ecotype formation that lead to reproductive isolation and ultimately speciation can be found in the small sea snail periwinkle, Littorina saxatilis. It is distributes across different habitats such as lagoons, salt marshes and rocky shores the range of distribution is from Portugal to Novaya Zemlaya and Svalbard and from North Carolina to Greenland. The polymorphic snail species have different heritable features such as size and shape depending on the habitat they occupy e.g. bare cliffs, boulders and barnacle belts. Phenotypic evolution in these snails can be strongly attributed to different ecological factors present in their habitats. For example, in coastal regions of Sweden, Spain and UK, Littorina saxatilis possess different shell shapes in response to predation by crabs or waves surges. Predation by crabs, also called crab crushing, gives rise to snails with wary behavior having large and thick shells which can easily retract and avoid predation. Wave-surfs on the other hand, select for smaller sized snails with large apertures to increase grip and bold behavior. All this provides the basis for the emergence of different snail ecotypes. Snail ecotypes on the basis of morphology and behavior pass these characteristic on to their offspring.

== Examples ==
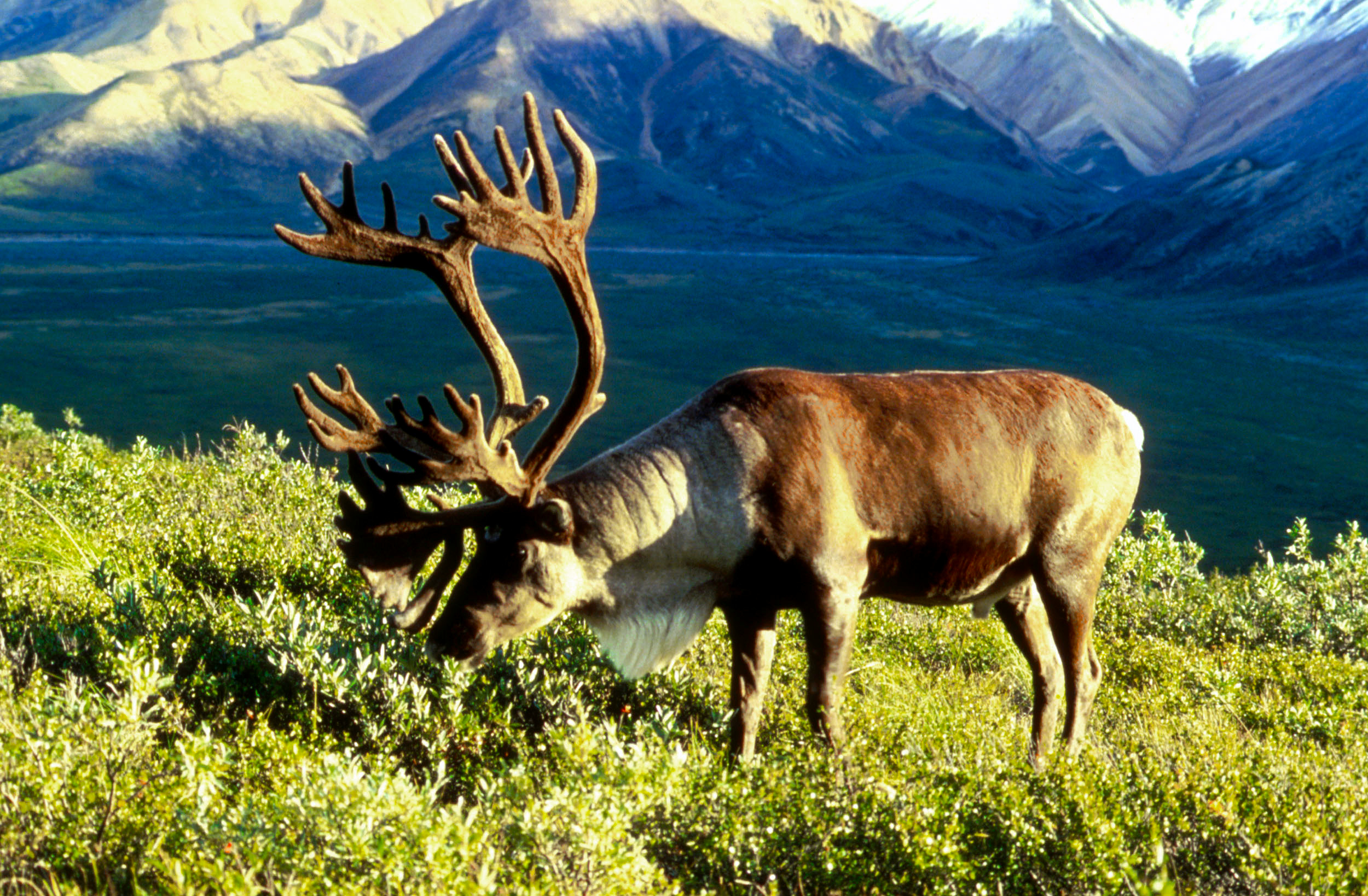
Rangifer tarandus caribou, a member of the woodland ecotype

- Tundra reindeer and woodland reindeer are two ecotypes of reindeer. The first migrate (travelling 5,000 km) annually between the two environments in large numbers whereas the other (who are much fewer) remain in the forest for the summer. In North America, the species Rangifer tarandus (locally known as caribou), was subdivided into five subspecies (Note: Banfield, who worked with both the Canadian Wildlife Service and the National Museum of Canada, in his often-cited 1961 classification, identified five subspecies of Rangifer tarandus: 1) the largely migratory barren-ground caribou subspecies Rangifer tarandus groenlandicus, which are found mainly in the Canadian territories of Nunavut and the Northwest Territories, along with western Greenland; 2) the subspecies Rangifer tarandus caribou which is divided into ecotypes: boreal woodland caribou, (also known as forest-dwelling, woodland caribou (boreal), mountain woodland caribou and migratory woodland caribou) —the migratory George River Caribou Herd, for example in the Ungava region of Quebec; 3) Rangifer tarandus pearyi (Peary caribou), the smallest of the species, known as Tuktu in Inuktitut, found in the northern islands of Nunavut and the Northwest Territories; 4) Rangifer tarandus granti subspecies Grant's caribou, which are mainly migratory and live in Alaska and the northern Yukon and 5) the R. t. dawsoni subspecies; † Queen Charlotte Islands caribou from the Queen Charlotte Islands (extinct since 1910)) by Banfield in 1961. Caribou are classified by ecotype depending on several behavioural factors – predominant habitat use (northern, tundra, mountain, forest, boreal forest, forest-dwelling), spacing (dispersed or aggregated) and migration (sedentary or migratory). For example, the subspecies Rangifer tarandus caribou is further distinguished by a number of ecotypes, including boreal woodland caribou, mountain woodland caribou, and migratory woodland caribou (such as the migratory George River Caribou Herd in the Ungava region of Quebec).
- Arabis fecunda, a herb endemic to some calcareous soils of Montana, United States, can be divided into two ecotypes. The one "low elevation" group lives near the ground in an arid, warm environment and has thus developed a significantly greater tolerance against drought than the "high elevation" group. The two ecotypes are separated by a horizontal distance of about 100 km (62 mi).
- It is commonly accepted that the Tucuxi dolphin has two ecotypes – the riverine ecotype found in some South American rivers and the pelagic ecotype found in the South Atlantic Ocean. In 2022, the common bottlenose dolphin (Tursiops truncatus), which had been considered to have two ecotypes in the western North Atlantic, was separated into two species by Costa et al. based on morphometric and genetic data, with the near-shore ecotype becoming Tursiops erebennus Cope, 1865, described in the nineteenth century from a specimen collected in the Delaware River.
- The warbler finch and the Cocos Island finch are viewed as separate ecotypes.
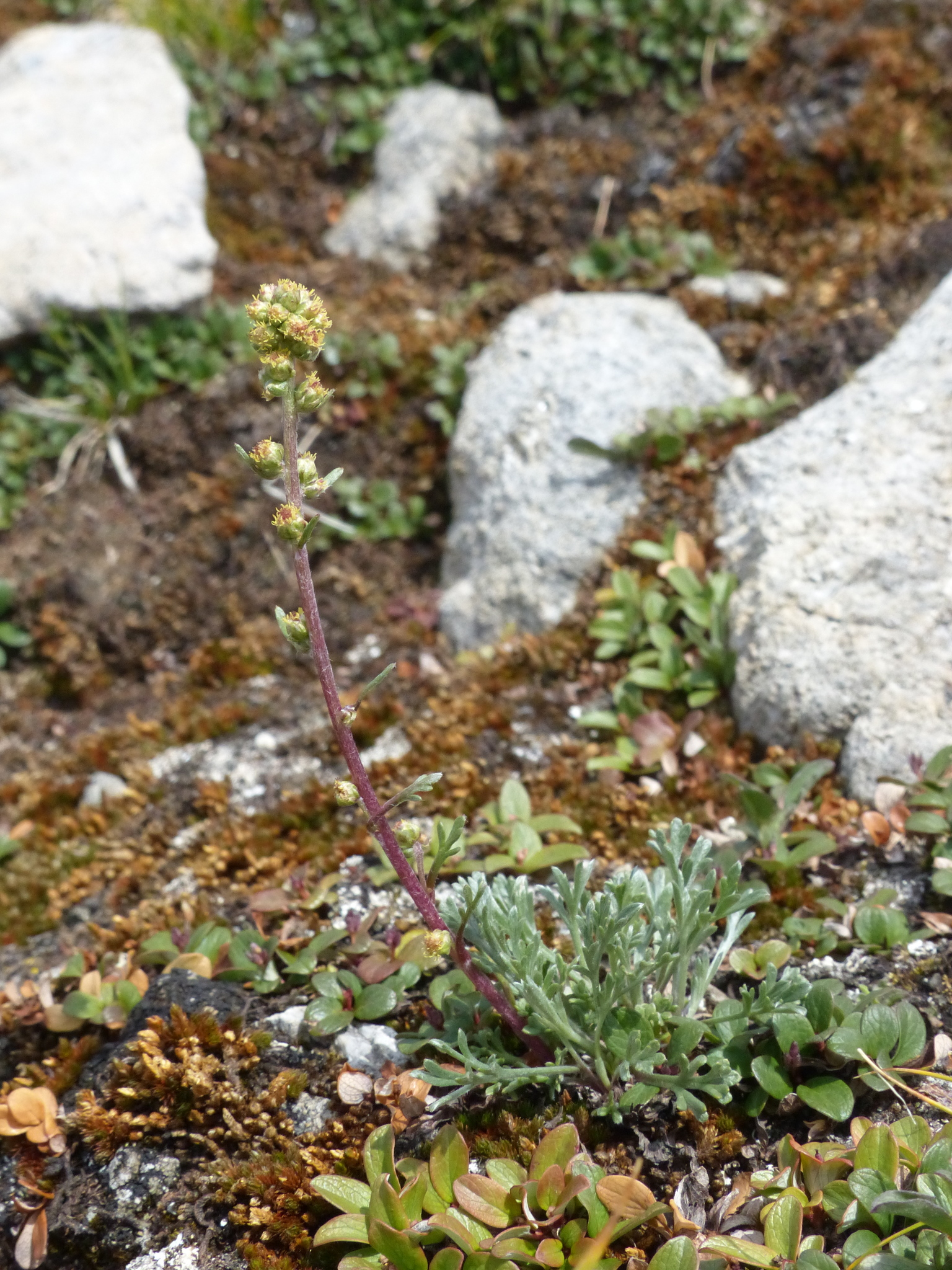
- Artemisia campestris subsp. borealis an ecotype of Artemisia campestris
  The aromatic plant Artemisia campestris also known as the field sagewort grows in a wide range of habitats from North America to the Atlantic coast and also in Eurasia. It has different forms arccoding to the environment where it grows. One variety which grows on shifting dunes at Falstrebo on the coast of Sweden has broad leaves, and white hairs while exhibiting upright growth. Another variety that grows in Oland in calcareous rocks displays horizontally expanded branches with no upright growth. These two extreme types are considered different varieties. Other examples include Artemisia campestris var. borealis which occupies the west of the Cascades crest in the Olympic Mountains in Washington while Artemisia campestris var. wormskioldii grows on the east side. The Northern wormwood, var. borealis has spike like-inflorescences with leaves concentrated on the plant base and divided into long narrow lobes. Wormskiold's northern wormwood, Artemisia campestris var. wormskioldii is generally shorter and hairy with large leaves surrounding the flowers.
- The Scots pine (Pinus sylvestris) has 20 different ecotypes in an area from Scotland to Siberia, all capable of interbreeding.
- Ecotype distinctions can be subtle and do not always require large distances; it has been observed that two populations of the same Helix snail species separated by only a few hundred kilometers prefer not to cross-mate, i.e., they reject one another as mates. This event probably occurs during the process of courtship, which may last for hours.

== See also ==
- Adaptation
- Ecophenotypic variation
- Biological classification
- Cline (biology)
- Ecotope
- Epigenetics
- Evolution
- Polymorphism (biology)
- Ring species
- Speciation
- Species problem
- Terroir
- Evidence for speciation by reinforcement
