= Rangifer (journal) =

- Discipline: Reindeer husbandry
- Language: English
- Edited by: Birgitta Åhman

Publication details
- History: 1981–present
- Publisher: Nordic Council for Reindeer Husbandry Research; Swedish University of Agricultural Sciences (Sweden)
- Frequency: annual
- Open access: Yes
- License: Creative Commons Attribution 3.0

Standard abbreviations
- ISO 4: Rangifer

Indexing
- ISSN: 0333-256X (print); 1890-6729 (web)

Links
- Journal homepage; Online access; Online archive

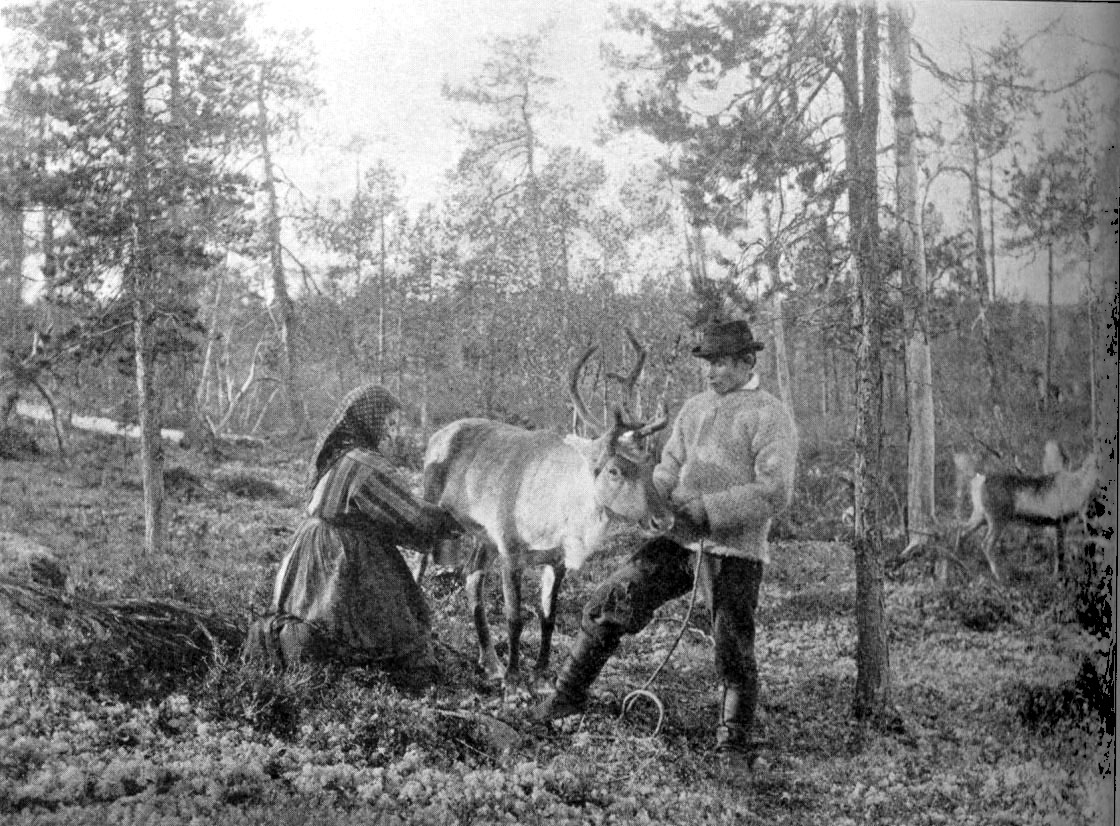
Reindeer milking in a forest (19th century)

Rangifer is an open-access scientific journal about northern ungulates and reindeer husbandry.

Rangifer is published since 1981 by the Nordic Council for Reindeer Husbandry Research. Paperback Rangifer was published regularly from 1981 to 2007. It was published by the Nordic Council for Reindeer Husbandry Research at the Swedish University of Agricultural Sciences, in the Department of Animal Husbandry and Management in Uppsala, Sweden. Special and report issues started at volume 28, 2008. Since then, it is primarily an online journal.

Rangifer publishes original research papers, review articles, and brief communications in all themes and fields related to reindeer and reindeer husbandry as culture and industry, including papers on other northern ungulates. The contents have "mainly been non-peer-reviewed material." The journal publishes under a Creative Commons Attribution (CC-BY) licence.

The journal is indexed and abstracted in BIOSIS, Biological Abstracts, CAB International and AGRIS.

== See also ==
- Open access in Norway
