= Valerius Geist =

Canadian biologist (1938–2021)

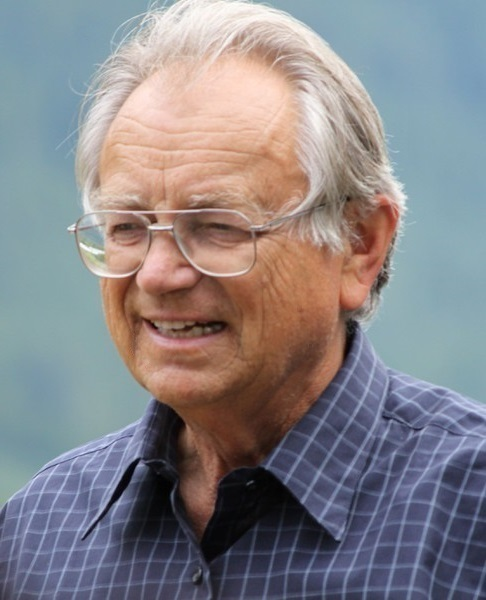
- Valerius Geist in 2011
- Born: February 2, 1938; Mykolaiv, Ukrainian SSR, USSR
- Died: July 6, 2021 (aged 83); Port Alberni, British Columbia, Canada
- Education: University of British Columbia
- Scientific career
- Fields: Ethology; Mammalogy
- Workplaces: University of Calgary
- Thesis: On the behaviour and evolution of American mountain sheep (1966)
- Doctoral advisor: Ian McTaggart-Cowan
- Other academic advisors: Konrad Lorenz

Valerius Geist (2 February 1938 – 6 July 2021) was a German-Canadian biologist and a professor emeritus in the Faculty of Environmental Design at the University of Calgary. He was a specialist on the biology, behavior, and social dynamics of North American large mammals (elk, moose, bighorn sheep, other wild ungulates and wolves), as well as on Neanderthal people and behaviour.

== Biography ==
He was born on February 2, 1938, in Nikolajew (Mykolaiv) at the coast of the Black Sea, then part of the Ukrainian Soviet Socialist Republic and the USSR. Both parents, Olga Geist and Alexander Shutov, were naval engineers specializing in marine architecture (his mother worked on submarines and icebreakers). In 1943, probably considered as Black Sea Germans, he and his mother, aunt and grandmother, had to flee from Russia to Germany. After 10 years growing up in Austria and Germany, he immigrated to Canada in 1953, the same year his German-born wife arrived in Port Alberni on Vancouver Island. Renate née Brall (16 January 1937 in Fulda, Germany - 13 October 2014). received her Bachelor of Science degree in Bacteriology and Biology from the University of British Columbia in 1959, later a Bachelor degree in Education, teaching German, among others at Mount Royal College. She translated volumes 3 and 10 of Grzimek's Animal Life Encyclopedia into English.

Valerius Geist graduated from high school in Regina, Saskatchewan in 1957 and started to study zoology at the University of British Columbia in Vancouver, where he met his wife in 1958. They married on May 20th 1961, had three children, and stayed usually in Port Alberni, where Renate's relatives lived. Valerius Geist earned a B.Sc. in zoology (1960), and Ph.D. in zoology (1967), both from the University of British Columbia. The family went in 1967 to Germany on a post-doctoral fellowship awarded to Valerius, and he completed his postdoctoral studies in Seewiesen at the Max Planck Institute for Behavioral Physiology (1967-1968) under Konrad Lorenz. His doctoral thesis was titled On the behaviour and evolution of American mountain sheep.

The Geists returned to Canada in 1968 where Valerius accepted a position at the University of Calgary. Since 1977, he has taught at the University of Calgary, where he was a founding member and first Program Director of Environmental Science in the Faculty of Environmental Design. He resided on Vancouver Island, B.C.

Valerius Geist passed away on July 6, 2021 after suffering from diabetes and a heart-attack.

== Scientific and public work ==
Valerius Geist is known for his scientific research on the behavior and population biology of many wild ungulate species and canids. He also acted as an expert witness in many areas, including animal behavior, environmental policy, native treaties, wildlife law enforcement and policy, and wildlife/vehicle collisions cases in the United States and Canada. He testified on wildlife conservation policy in court, before Senate of the State of Montana and before the Parliamentary Committee on Environment, and Sustainable Development in Ottawa.

=== Ungulates ===
After a period of supporting the keeping of game in ranches as a way to use the animals while protecting them, he warned that Alberta's government's recommendation to keep deer in enclosures was a mistake both scientifically and economically. When calamities caused by disease and the collapse of the market forced many ranchers to slaughter their animals and close their farms, this was confirmed.

=== Wolves ===
Geist became an outspoken commentator on wolves and recognized them as dangerous predators to humans. He was of the opinion that wolves are most likely to fulfill their ecological function in unpopulated and very thinly populated areas. His publications on wolves include as topics also the development of great shyness towards humans by hunting, hybridization with coyotes (Coywolf), where distribution areas of both species overlap, hybridization with domestic dogs (wolfdog) in areas populated by humans, and diseases spread by wolves, for example the dog tapeworm, whose larval stages lead to Hydatid disease in herbivores and humans.

In his lectures and writings he pointed out that wolves cause serious damage to wildlife and that they cause great suffering to wild ungulates such as white-tailed deer, elk, and bison by condemning them to a slow, agonising death when they are torn.

The paradigm of the self-regulation of nature is, according to his findings, a simple-minded intellectual error. The mechanisms of negative feedback assumed in this concept would not work like this in nature, but self-reinforcing effects would lead to a decline in biodiversity. With active wildlife management and care, humans can achieve a much greater biodiversity and productivity of ecosystems. Humans can save the game the brutality of getting torn by wolves. Hunters practicing ethical hunting would treat game far more humanely than "nature" does.

==== Geist's seven stages before wolves attack people ====
Regarding the behavior of wolves towards human beings he described seven steps from strong shyness and avoiding the nearness of the human, then searching anthropogenic food sources and habituation, then possible explorative attacks, in which they only approach, up to predatory attacks on people, that usually take place only under the precondition that the seven steps described by him are passed through. He became involved in the inquiry surrounding the Death of Kenton Joel Carnegie in November 2005 at Wollaston Lake in Saskatchewan, Canada. Geist expressed growing concern as wolves began to follow his wife outside their home on Vancouver Island and threaten her safety. When wolves appear friendly, they are simply examining the menu. He was openly critical of the myth that wolves do not attack people and observed that Joseph Stalin promulgated this Big Lie in his effort to disarm the rural population which had traditionally kept firearms for protection.

The seven stages leading to an attack on people by wolves, according to Valerius Geist, paraphrased:

1. The first signs are deer, stags and other prey animals that increasingly arrive in villages or cities, fleeing from the wolf into urban areas
2. In the second phase, wolves follow their prey and approach human dwellings, especially at night. This can be recognized, among other things, by dogs barking restlessly, or howls of wolves even during daytime
3. According to Valerius Geist, stage three begins when the wolves also show themselves during daylight, observing people, approaching buildings
4. In phase four the presence of wolves can no longer be overlooked. They attack dogs and small farm animals even during the day, even if they are in close proximity to houses. They appear on terraces and in gardens, establishing their territory.
5. In stage five, attacks on large farm animals increase: In this phase, for example, riders are surrounded and pursued or larger farm animals such as cattle are injured. They are found with ears torn off, tails cut in half or genitals mutilated. Wolves approach houses, mount verandas and look into windows and open doors.
6. Stage six is reached when wolves examine people as potential new kind of prey, appearing to be tame in the immediate vicinity of people. They nudge walkers with their noses, tug on clothing or even pinch the arm. They can be driven away by screaming and waving, but they don't run far. Everything seems playful, but they are testing how humans behave when attacked, what kind of claws and teeth these skinny bears have. They still withdraw when confronted, but defend kills by moving towards people, growling and barking.
7. In the opinion of Valerius Geist, the climax of the escalation has been reached at level seven when wolves have lost their fear of humans and attack. As they are still inexperienced and a bit clumsy, persons may still be able to defend themselves against a single wolf, but even armed men have few chances against an entire pack than can take down big bears.

=== Paleozoology ===
Geist also worked in the field of palaeozoology of ungulates and canids and researched the differences in the ecological status of wolves in the Pleistocene megafauna and the present wild fauna. In relation to the respective works, he pointed out the presence of 'Predator pits' that were caused by gray wolf (Canis lupus) predation on Holarctic ungulates, resulting in the lowering of ungulate distributions and populations to suboptimal levels, and kept suboptimal via brown/grizzly bear (Ursus arctos) attrition on ungulate calves during birthing seasons. Further, the explanation offered by Geist to how the Pleistocene ecology of the Gray Wolf did not have the same impacts, were that megafaunal hypercarnivores such as the taxa Machairodontinae, Panthera, and Arctodus simus suppressed them as a direct consequence of intense competition amongst the megafauna predator guild, at the time.

Geist's interest in Neanderthal people was captured in a National Geographic article suggesting that Neanderthal may not have learned to throw, supported by their hunting methods. He noted the likely possibility that they engaged in cannibalism, and that they may have actually ranched children from other tribes for food. He suggested that ancient cave art was more likely to be graffiti, left by young men who dared one another to go deep into the earth to make their marks. In this, he strongly supported R. Dale Guthrie's published views "The Nature of Paleolithic Art", 2006.

==== Migration barrier hypothesis ====
In the late 1980s, Geist hypothesized that "specialist, aggressive, competitive Rancholabrean fauna" such as Arctodus were a barrier for humans (along with other Siberian megafauna such as moose, grey wolves and brown bears) when migrating into North America (both Beringia and below the ice sheets). Male A. simus were the largest and most powerful carnivorous land mammals in North America, with the potential specialization in obtaining and dominating distant and scarce resources. Humans in this hypothesis, though familiar with brown bears, would not have been able to avoid predation or effectively compete with Arctodus simus and other large Pleistocene North American carnivores, making human expansion difficult in Beringia and impossible south of the ice sheets. However, this theory has never been accepted by anthropologists. Paul Matheus argued that there were negligible ecological differences across the mammoth steppe, and that humans successfully competed against and even hunted territorial cave bears, cave hyenas, cave lions, leopards, tigers and wolves in Eurasia before reaching eastern Beringia, making the solitary Arctodus an unlikely impediment to expansion. Indeed, new dates establish an extended co-existence of humans and megafauna such as Arctodus across North America.

== Awards ==
Geist won the Wilderness Defenders Award from the Alberta Wilderness Association in 2004. He is the only North American hunter to be honored with professional membership in both the Boone and Crockett Club and its European counterpart, the International Council for Game and Wildlife Conservation (Conseil International de la Chasse).

== Selected publications ==
- "Gray wolves and the black side of the 'Nature knows best' dogma, or how hands-on management is vital to high biodiversity, productivity and a humane treatment of wildlife". In: Beiträge zur Jagd- & Wildforschung, Band 44, 2019, page 65-71
- Living on the Edge: The Mountain Goat's World, by Valerius Geist, Dale E. Toweill, October 19, 2010
- Valerius Geist (2009): Wolves – When Ignorance Is Bliss
- Valerius Geist (2007): Circumstances leading to wolf attacks on people
- Valerius Geist; Will N. Graves: Wolves in Russia - Anxiety Through the Ages. Detselig Enterprises 2007. ISBN 978-1-55059-332-7
- Valerius Geist: Wolves on Vancouver Island
- Moose: Behavior, Ecology, Conservation, by Valerius Geist, Robert Wegner (Foreword By), Michael H. Francis (Photographer), November 26, 2005
- Whitetail Tracks: The Deer's History & Impact in North America, by Valerius Geist, Michael H. Francis (Photographer) September 2001
- Antelope Country: Pronghorns: The Last Americans, by Valerius Geist, Michael H. Francis (Photographer) 2001
- Return of Royalty: Wild Sheep of North America, by Valerius Geist, Dale E. Toweill, Ken Carlson (Illustrator) 1999
- Mule Deer Country, by Valerius Geist, Michael H. Francis, October 31, 1990
- Deer of the World: Their Evolution, Behaviour, and Ecology, by Valerius Geist, Swan Hill Press (February 16, 1999)
- Buffalo Nation: History and Legend of the North American Bison, by Valerius Geist, May 9, 1998 (also 1996)
- Wildlife Conservation Policy, by Valerius Geist and Ian McTaggart-Cowan October 15, 1995
- Wild Sheep Country, by Valerius Geist, Michael H. Francis (Photographer), September 1993
- Elk Country, by Valerius Geist, June 1993 (also 1991)
- Life Strategies, Human Evolution, Environmental Design: Toward a Biological Theory of Health, by Valerius Geist, January 26, 1979
- Mountain Sheep: A Study in Behavior and Evolution. Wildlife Behavior and Ecology Series, by Valerius Geist, 1971
