= Reindeer (disambiguation) =

Reindeer (any of six species in the genus Rangifer; called caribou in North America) is a deer from Arctic and Subarctic North America and Eurasia; it may refer to:

== Reindeer ==
- Reindeer (genus of deer)
- Finnish forest reindeer
- Siberian forest reindeer
- Siberian tundra reindeer
- Svalbard reindeer
- Peary caribou
- Porcupine caribou
- Dolphin-Union caribou
- Greenland reindeer
- Reindeer distribution
- Reindeer cheese
- Reindeer hunting in Greenland
- Reindeer in Siberian shamanism
- Reindeer in South Georgia
- Sautéed reindeer

== Folklore ==
- Santa Claus's reindeer
  - Rudolph the Red-Nosed Reindeer

== Military ==
- HMS Reindeer, ships of the Royal Navy
- USS Reindeer, ships of the US Navy
- Operation Reindeer, 1978 South African military operation in Angola

== Places ==
- Reindeer Island, Lake Winnipeg, Manitoba, Canada
- Reindeer Lake, on the border between Saskatchewan and Manitoba, Canada
- Reindeer Valley, South Georgia

== Literature ==
- Rutland Reindeer, a fictional aircraft in Nevil Shute's 1948 novel, No Highway

== Films ==
- Rutland Reindeer, a fictional aircraft in the 1951 movie No Highway in the Sky
- Reindeer Games, 2000 thriller film, directed by John Frankenheimer

== See also ==
- Caribou (disambiguation)
- Reindeer Island (disambiguation)
- Reindeer Lake (disambiguation)
- Reindeer River (disambiguation)
