= List of shipwrecks in May 1885 =

The list of shipwrecks in May 1885 includes ships sunk, foundered, grounded, or otherwise lost during May 1885.

== 1 May ==
List of shipwrecks: 1 May 1885
Ship	State	Description
Glastry	United Kingdom	The hulk was driven ashore 2 nautical miles (3.7 km) north of Yorkshire.
Napoleon	United States	The whaling barque was crushed by ice in the Bering Sea on 1 May 1885 and sank. The 36 on board took to the ship's boats and 14 were rescued alive from two boats on 9–10 May by the schooner James A Garfield, then landed by US Revenue Steamer Thomas Corwin. Only one survived from the other two boats, and was recovered by USRC Rush from hospitable eskimos in Siberia in 1887.
Roady	Norway	The schooner sank in the Baltic Sea. Her crew were rescued by Livonia (Russia). Roady was on a voyage from Frederikshald to Riga, Russia.
Surf	United Kingdom	The yacht ran aground at Sunderland, County Durham.

== 2 May ==
List of shipwrecks: 2 May 1885
Ship	State	Description
Summer Cloud	United Kingdom	The schooner sprang a leak and foundered 30 nautical miles (56 km) south south west of The Smalls, Cornwall. Her crew were rescued. She was on a voyage from "Hanelong" to Chatham, Kent.

== 3 May ==
List of shipwrecks: 3 May 1885
Ship	State	Description
Alpha	Norway	The brig foundered in the North Sea. Her crew were rescued by Charles Kahl (Flag unknown). Alpha was on a voyage from South Shields, County Durham, United Kingdom to Karlskrona, Sweden.
Carlton Tower	United Kingdom	The steamship was driven ashore at Marseille, Bouches-du-Rhône, France.
Enrique de Calvet or Enrique Calvet	Flag unknown	The steamship ran aground on the Shipwash Sand, in the North Sea off the coast of Suffolk, United Kingdom, on a voyage from Shields, River Tyne to Genoa, Italy. She was refloated the following day by tugs and with the assistance of three yawls, one of which was Wentworth (United Kingdom).
Wear	United Kingdom	The sloop was driven ashore at Whitby, Yorkshire. Her crew were rescued by the Whitby Lifeboat. Wear was on a voyage from Hartlepool, County Durham to Mundesley, Norfolk. She subsequently broke up.

== 4 May ==
List of shipwrecks: 4 May 1885
Ship	State	Description
Enrique de Calvert	Italy	The schooner was driven ashore on the Shipwash Sand, in the North Sea off the coast of Suffolk, United Kingdom. She was on a voyage from South Shields, County Durham, United Kingdom to Genoa.

== 5 May ==
List of shipwrecks: 5 May 1885
Ship	State	Description
Beaconsfield, and Ventnor	United Kingdom	The steamship Ventnor collided with the steamship Beaconsfield and foundered off Barry Island, Glamorgan. Her crew were rescued by Beaconsfield. Ventnor was on a voyage from Penarth, Glamorgan to Southampton, Hampshire. Beaconsfield was on a voyage from Antwerp, Belgium to Cardiff, Glamorgan.
Pleiades	United Kingdom	The schooner was run into by the steamship Cumbrian (United Kingdom) and sank off Ilfracombe, Devon. Her five crew were rescued by Cumbrian. Pleiades was on a voyage from Rochester, Kent to Newport, Monmouthshire.

== 6 May ==
List of shipwrecks: 6 May 1885
Ship	State	Description
Anna Helene, and Warsaw	Russia; United Kingdom	The steamship Warsaw collided with the schooner Anna Helene at the mouth of the River Carron. Both vessels ran aground. Warsaw was on a voyage from Grangemouth, Stirlingshire to Dundee, Forfarshire. Anna Helene was on a voyage from Riga to Grangemouth.
Bayard	United Kingdom	The ship collided with an iceberg 55 nautical miles (102 km) south of Cape Race, Newfoundland Colony and was damaged. She was on a voyage from Marseille, Bouches-du-Rhône, France to Saint Pierre. She completed her voyage in a leaky condition.

== 7 May ==
List of shipwrecks: 7 May 1885
Ship	State	Description
Suppicich	Germany	The brig sprang a leak and foundered off Saba, Leeward Islands. Her crew survived. She was on a voyage from Trinidad to Bremerhaven.

== 8 May ==
List of shipwrecks: 8 May 1885
Ship	State	Description
Helvetia	Belgium	The steamship sank in the Atlantic Ocean near Scatarie Island, Nova Scotia, Canada.
Mary E. Fish	United States	The pilot boat was run down and sank by the schooner Frank Harrington (United States) 40 nautical miles (74 km) south west of the Barnegat Lighthouse, New Jersey. The four pilots and her crew were able to escape from the sinking vessel.

== 9 May ==
List of shipwrecks: 9 May 1885
Ship	State	Description
Bertha Bahbruhs	Germany	The ship was abandoned in the Atlantic Ocean. Her crew were rescued by Adelaide Baker (United Kingdom). Bertha Bahrbruhs was on a voyage from Doboy, Georgia, United States to Newport, Monmouthshire, United Kingdom.
Langlands	United Kingdom	The barque capsized at Swansea, Glamorgan.

== 10 May ==
List of shipwrecks: 10 May 1885
Ship	State	Description
John Edwin	United Kingdom	The ship was driven ashore and wrecked near Coatham, Yorkshire. Her crew were rescued by fishing boats. She was on a voyage from South Shields, County Durham to Whitstable, Kent.
Liscard	United Kingdom	The steamship ran aground in the Suez Canal. She was on a voyage from Bombay, India to New York, United States.
Mary Louisa	United Kingdom	The steamship was damaged by ice and sank off the coast of the Newfoundland Colony. She was on a voyage from New York to the Newcastle upon Tyne, Northumberland.
Scynthia	United Kingdom	The steamship ran aground off the Tarbert Lighthouse, County Kerry. She was refloated.
Thorsbjerg	United Kingdom	The barque was driven onto a sandbank off Whitehaven, Cumberland, United Kingdom and was wrecked. Her crew of nine, and the Pilot, were rescued by the RNLI Whitehaven Lifeboat Elizabeth Leicester (ON 78). She was on a voyage from Laurvig to Whitehaven.

== 14 May ==
List of shipwrecks: 14 May 1885
Ship	State	Description
Lizzie	Cape Colony	The steam launch ran aground and was wrecked at East London. Her crew were rescued.
Messina	Germany	The steamship collided with the steamship Numida (United Kingdom) and sank in the English Channel 16 nautical miles (30 km) south of Durlston Head, Dorset, United Kingdom with the loss of ten of her crew. Messina was on a voyage from the Mediterranean to Hamburg.

== 16 May ==
List of shipwrecks: 16 May 1885
Ship	State	Description
Amethyst	United Kingdom	The steam yacht ran aground off Jersey, Channel Islands. She was refloated and taken in to Guernsey, Channel Islands.
Clandiboye	United Kingdom	The barque was driven ashore and wrecked at Schooner Pond, Nova Scotia, Canada.
Maggie	United Kingdom	The schooner was run down and sunk off Great Yarmouth, Norfolk by the steamship Lizzie (United Kingdom). Her crew were rescued by Lizzie. Maggie was on a voyage from London to Middlesbrough, Yorkshire.

== 17 May ==
List of shipwrecks: 17 May 1885
Ship	State	Description
Copia	United Kingdom	The steam yacht was damaged by fire in Gourock Bay. She was subsequently taken in to Gourock, Renfrewshire.

== 19 May ==
List of shipwrecks: 19 May 1885
Ship	State	Description
Eliza	United Kingdom	The ketch was driven ashore and damaged at Portsoy, Aberdeenshire.
Ireland	United Kingdom	The barge collided with the steamship Cygnet (United Kingdom) and sank in the River Thames at Deptford, Kent. Her crew were rescued by the Thames Police.
Guiding Star	United Kingdom	The tug struck the Horse Rock and was beached on the White Sand, where she became a wreck. She was towing the barque Hedwig (United Kingdom) from Liverpool, Lancashire to Cardiff, Glamorgan. The barque went out to sea.
Liverpool	United Kingdom	The Mersey Flat was run into by the steamship St. Kevin (United Kingdom) and sank at Liverpool. Liverpool was on a voyage from Garston, Lancashire to Liverpool.

== 21 May ==
List of shipwrecks: 21 May 1885
Ship	State	Description
J.W.J.	United Kingdom	The pilot vessel collided with Sea Fisher (United Kingdom) and sank off Swansea in the Bristol Channel. Sea Fisher rescued her four crew members.

== 22 May ==
List of shipwrecks: 22 May 1885
Ship	State	Description
Medea	United Kingdom	The ship was sighted whilst on a voyage from Cardiff, Glamorgan to Surabaya, Netherlands East Indies. No further trace, reported missing.

== 23 May ==
List of shipwrecks: 23 May 1885
Ship	State	Description
Edwin	United Kingdom	The ship ran aground off Hjelm Island, Denmark. She was on a voyage from New Orleans, Louisiana, United States to Aarhus, Denmark. She was refloated and completed her voyage.

== 25 May ==
List of shipwrecks: 25 May 1885
Ship	State	Description
George Jeanne	France	The fishing brig was run down and sunk in the Grand Banks of Newfoundland by the steamship City of Rome (United Kingdom) with the loss of 22 of her 24 crew.
xxxx	United Kingdom	The ship .

== 26 May ==
List of shipwrecks: 26 May 1885
Ship	State	Description
Corn May	United States	The schooner was lost on a reef off Sable Island, Nova Scotia, Canada. Her 24 crew survived.

== 30 May ==
List of shipwrecks: 30 May 1885
Ship	State	Description
Kate Moffatt	United States	The tug ran aground in Lake Huron off Blur Point, three miles (4.8 km) above New Presque Isle Lighthouse, Michigan, in dense fog. She then caught fire and burned to the waterline. Her machinery and boilers were salvaged in 1886.
Teucer	United Kingdom	The steamship was wrecked off Ouessant, Finistère, France. All on board were rescued. She was on a voyage from Singapore, Straits Settlements to Amsterdam, North Holland, Netherlands.

== Unknown date ==
List of shipwrecks: Unknown date in May 1885
Ship	State	Description
Alert	Sweden	The schooner ran aground on Sondre Rosse. She was on a voyage from Gävle to Hull, Yorkshire, United Kingdom.
Alexander	Russia	The steamship was driven ashore on Fårö, Sweden.
A. Strong	United Kingdom	The steamship struck a submerged object and sprang a leak. She was on a voyage from Varna, Bulgaria to Gibraltar. She put in to Malta.
Bergamo	United Kingdom	The steamship ran aground off Öland, Sweden.
Brankelow	United Kingdom	The steamship ran aground in the Rangoon River. She was refloated and put in to Rangoon, Burma for repairs.
Catania	Germany	The steamship was driven ashore at "Batean", Netherlands East Indies. She was on a voyage from Australia to Singapore, Straits Settlements.
Chancellor	United Kingdom	The steamship was driven ashore in the Chandeleur Islands. She was on a voyage from São Vicente Island, Cape Verde Islands to New Orleans, Louisiana, United States. She was refloated and resumed her voyage.
Chandernagor	United Kingdom	The barque ran aground in the Pearl River. She was refloated.
Commodore	United Kingdom	The brig was driven ashore at Black Head, County Clare.
Christina	Norway	The barque was abandoned at sea. Her crew were rescued. She was on a voyage from Cork, United Kingdom to a Canadian port.
Decision	United Kingdom	The ship was abandoned at sea. Her crew were rescued by the steamship River Lagon (United Kingdom). Decision was on a voyage from the Clyde to Quebec City, Canada.
Delphin	Flag unknown	The ship was abandoned in the Mediterranean Sea before 6 May. She was on a voyage from Licata, Sicily, Italy to Lisbon, Portugal.
Earl of Dalhousie	United Kingdom	The ship capsized and sank at San Francisco, California, United States.
Elizabeth Kelly	United Kingdom	The ship was driven onto the Sables Sand, off the coast of Somme, France.
Fisherman	United Kingdom	The tug grounded on an anchor and sank at Cardiff, Glamorgan.
Gem of the Sea	United Kingdom	The brigantine was driven ashore at Querqueville, Manche, France. Her crew were rescued. She was on a voyage from Llanelly, Glamorgan to Cherbourg, Manche.
Glendower	United Kingdom	The steamship ran aground in the Torres Strait. She was refloated and taken in to Batavia, Netherlands East Indies in a leaky condition.
Goethe	Germany	The barque was lost at sea. Her crew were rescued by the barque Angantyr (Norway). Goethe was on a voyage from Darien, Georgia, United States to Antwerp, Belgium.
Gootlieb	Flag unknown	The ship was wrecked.
Haabet	Norway	The brig ran aground on Sondre Rosse. She was on a voyage from Gloucester, United Kingdom to Danzig, Germany.
Hama	Norway	The barque ran aground at "Knollen", Denmark. She was on a voyage from Charleston, South Carolina, United States to Stettin, Germany. She was refloated with assistance and resumed her voyage.
Knight of the Garter	United Kingdom	The ship was driven ashore at False Point, India. She was on a voyage from Liverpool, Lancashire to Calcutta, India. She was reflaoted with the assistance of a steamship and resumed her voyage.
Llanishen	United Kingdom	The steamship struck the Dolitto Rock, in the Mediterranean Sea, and sank. Her crew were rescued.
Magdalena	Norway	The barque was abandoned at sea. Her crew were rescued.
Møn	Denmark	The ship was lost at sea. Her crew were rescued by Orion (United Kingdom). Møn was on a voyage from Denmark to Quebec City.
Norden	Sweden	The brig was beached at Stege, Denmark, where she became a wreck. All on board were rescued. She was on a voyage from Gävle to Shoreham-by-Sea, Sussex, United Kingdom.
Perseverance	United Kingdom	The steamship was driven ashore and sank at Steinort, Germany. She was on a voyage from Kertch to Riga, Russia.
Perthshire	United Kingdom	The ship was driven ashore at "Blindland", Falkland Islands. She was on a voyage from Portland, Oregon, United States to London.
Pioneer	United Kingdom	The steam wherry ran aground and sank at Sunderland, County Durham. She was refloated on 15 May and beached. Subsequently placed under repair.
Roxburgh Castle	United Kingdom	The steamship was driven ashore "in the Cluster", 6 nautical miles (11 km) from Turku, Grand Duchy of Finland. She was on a voyage from Cardiff to Helsinki, Grand Duchy of Finland.
Russie	United Kingdom	The steamship was wrecked at Sinope, Ottoman Empire.
R. W. Merriam	United Kingdom	The ship caught fire and was abandoned at sea. She was on a voyage from Liverpool to Halifax, Nova Scotia, Canada.
Sunbeam	United Kingdom	The ship was driven ashore at Bridgwater, Somerset. She was refloated on 14 May with the assistance of a tug and taken in to Bridgwater the next day.
Thinca	Norway	The barque was driven ashore at Halifax, Nova Scotia, Canada. She was on a voyage from Mandal, Norway, to Halifax.
Tordenskjold	Norway	The barque was driven ashore and wrecked on the coast of Nova Scotia. She was on a voyage from Kristiansand to Nova Scotia.
Troqueer	United Kingdom	The steamship ran aground on the Finngrundet, in the Baltic Sea. Seven of her crew were rescued; the rest were reported missing. She was on a voyage from Hudiksvall, Sweden to Sutton Bridge, Lincolnshire.
Turgot	United Kingdom	The steamship collided with the steamship Jersey (United Kingdom) and was severely damaged.
Twilight	United States	The ship ran aground at Bermuda. She was on a voyage from Penedo, Brazil to New York.
Vesta	Flag unknown	The steamship ran aground at Ljusne, Sweden and became waterlogged.
Warren B. Potter	United States	The ship was driven ashore at Barnegat, New Jersey. She was on a voyage from "Macorio" to New York.
Wolgast	Germany	The steamship ran aground on the Middelgrund, in the Baltic Sea. She was on a voyage from Riga to Grimsby, Lincolnshire, United Kingdom.
Unnamed	United Kingdom	The sloop ran aground on the Morthoe Stone, on the coast of Devon.
