= Leith Harbour =

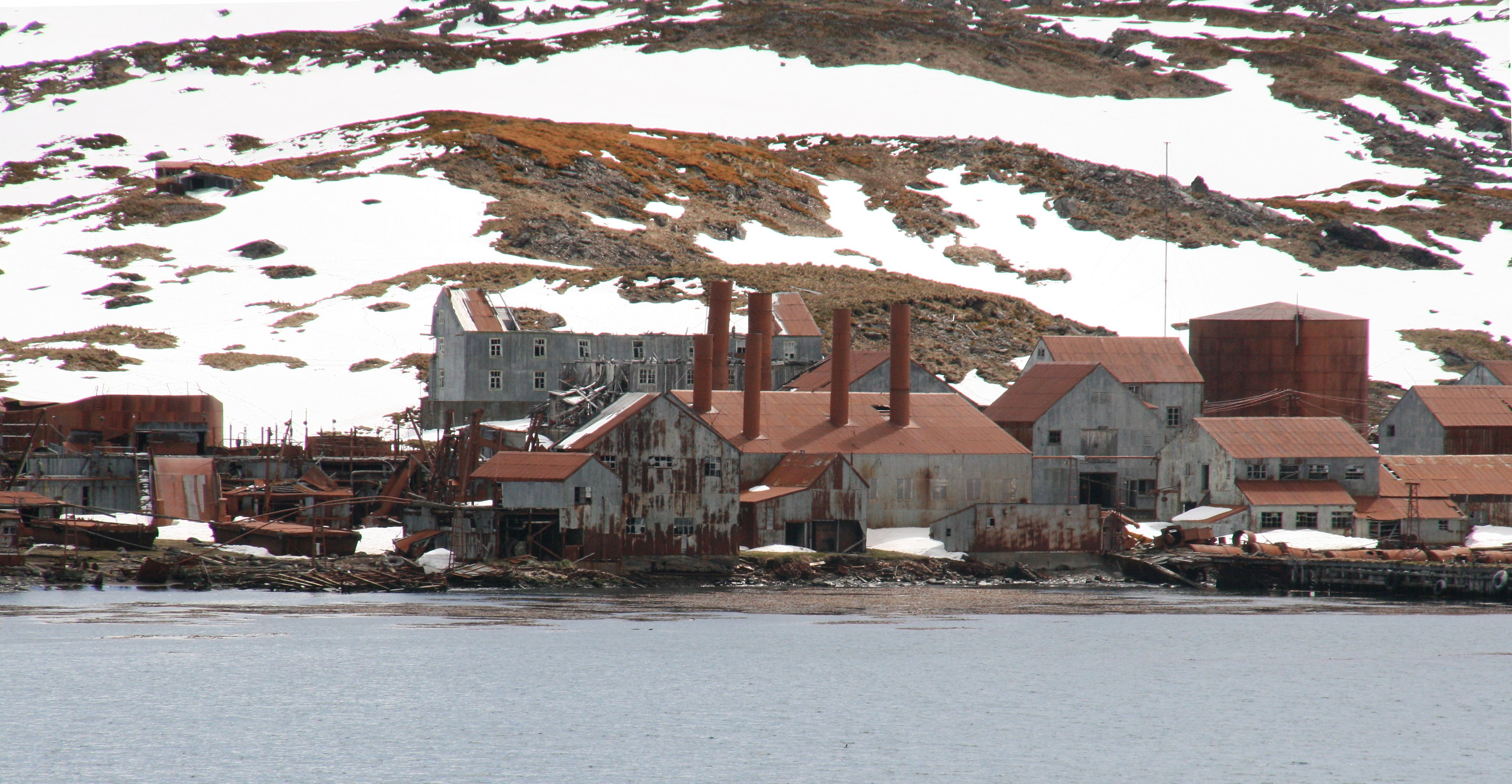
- Leith Harbour whaling station in November 2007

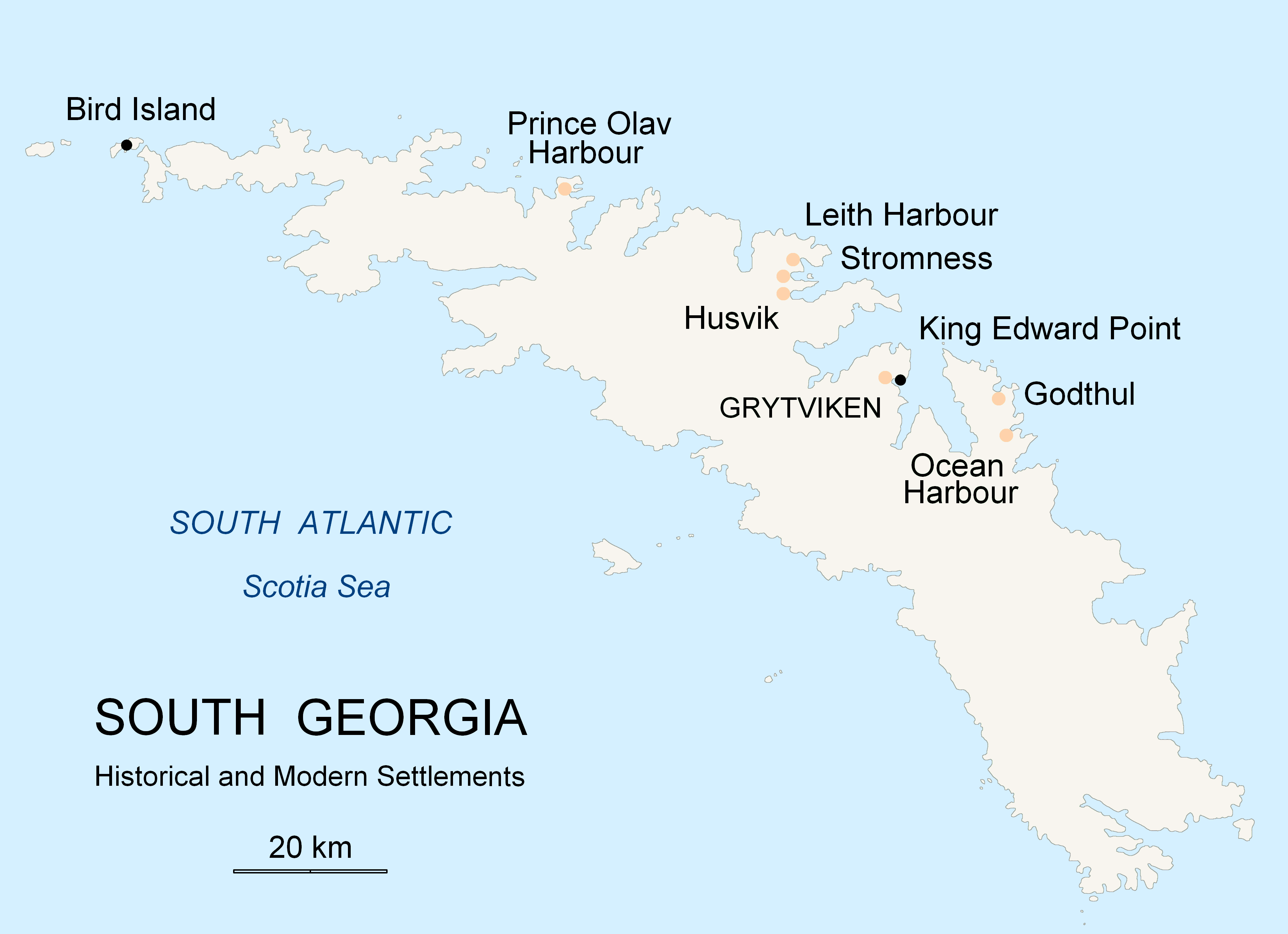
- South Georgia settlements
- Coordinates: 54°08′30″S 36°41′15″W
- Country: United Kingdom
- British Overseas Territory: South Georgia and the South Sandwich Islands
- Time zone: UTC−2 (GST)

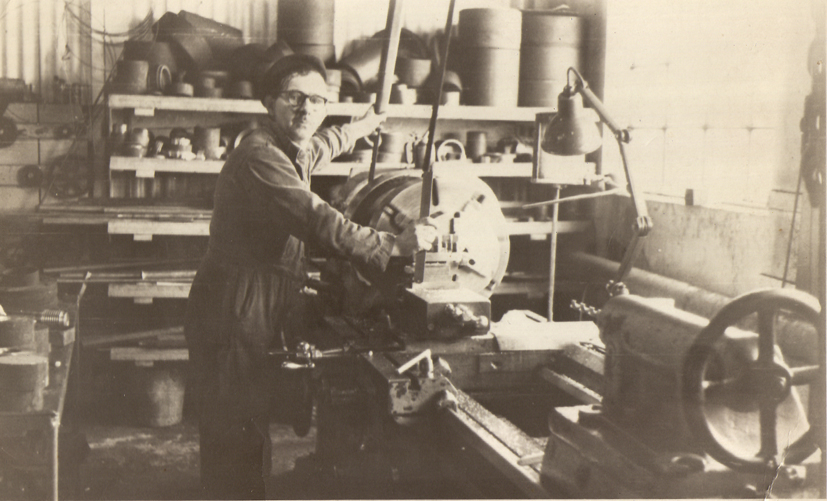
A Scottish whaler in workshop, Leith Harbour, South Georgia, mid-1940s.

Historical and modern settlements of South Georgia Island.

Leith Harbour (54.141°S 36.688°W), also known as Port Leith, was a whaling station on the northeast coast of South Georgia, established and operated by Christian Salvesen Ltd, Edinburgh. The station was in operation from 1909 until 1965. It was the largest of seven whaling stations, situated near the mouth of Stromness Bay.

It is named after Leith, the harbour area of Edinburgh, Christian Salvesen's home town.

== History ==
South Georgia was once the world's largest whaling centre, with shore stations at Grytviken (operating 1904–64), Leith Harbour (1909–65), Ocean Harbour (1909–20), Husvik (1910–60), Stromness (1913–61) and Prince Olav Harbour (1917–31). The Japanese companies Kokusai Gyogyo, Kabushike Kaisha and Nippon Suisan Kaisha sub-leased Leith Harbour in 1963–65, the last seasons of South Georgia whaling. In 1912 Leith Harbour was the site of the second introduction of reindeer to South Georgia, an attempt that failed when the entire herd was killed by an avalanche in 1918.

Leith Harbour was reconnoitred in 1908 by Henrik Henriksen, a Falkland Islander of German-speaking Finnish heritage who was the first manager of the whaling station. Henriksen was succeeded by Leganger Hansen in 1916. Hansen remained until 1937, earning the unofficial title of 'King of South Georgia'.

During the Second World War the whaling stations were closed excepting Grytviken and Leith Harbour. Most of the British and Norwegian whaling factories and catchers were destroyed by German raiders, while the rest were called up to serve under Allied command. The resident British magistrates (W. Barlas and A.I. Fleuret) attended to the island's defence throughout the war. The Royal Navy armed the merchant vessel Queen of Bermuda to patrol South Georgian and Antarctic waters, and deployed two four-inch guns at key locations protecting the approaches to Cumberland Bay and Stromness Bay, i.e., to Grytviken and Leith Harbour respectively. These batteries (still present) were operated by volunteers from among the Norwegian whalers who were trained for the purpose.

Prince Philip visited the settlement in 1957, while Princess Anne, as patron of the South Georgia Heritage Trust, made a tour of South Georgia in 2017.

The Falklands War was precipitated in March 1982 when a group of around fifty Argentines, posing as scrap metal merchants, occupied the abandoned whaling station at Leith Harbour. They were understood to have a commercial contract to remove scrap metal at Leith Harbour but they arrived aboard ARA Bahía Buen Suceso, a ship chartered by the Argentine Government. 32 special forces troops from Corbeta Uruguay were brought by the Argentine Navy ship Bahía Paraiso to South Georgia and landed at Leith Harbour on 25 March 1982.

On 25 April 1982 the Royal Navy damaged and captured the Argentine submarine Santa Fé at South Georgia. The Argentine garrison in Grytviken surrendered without returning fire and so did the detachment in Leith Harbour, commanded by Captain Astiz, the following day.

== Present ==
There is a gun emplacement on the hill behind the station, and another at Hansen Point with the original 4-inch gun still in position. Leith Harbour boasted a hospital, a library, a cinema, and a narrow gauge railway. The centre of Leith Harbour is a graveyard with a second, larger, cemetery to the rear of the station. Due to its nature, the station also contained a factory and a flensing plan or platform. Since 2010 access to the station has been prohibited due to the dangers posed by asbestos and collapsing buildings.

Leith Harbour and the hardships endured by the whalers are the subject of "The Little Pot Stove", a song covered by Nic Jones and written by the former whaling engineer turned singer-songwriter Harry Robertson.

== See also ==
- Christian Salvesen Ltd
- Coronda Peak
- History of South Georgia and the South Sandwich Islands
