= Barff Peninsula =

Peninsula forming the east margin of Cumberland East Bay, South Georgia Island

Barff Peninsula (54°19′S 36°18′W) is a peninsula forming the east margin of Cumberland East Bay, South Georgia Island. It is 8 miles (13 km) long and extends northwest from Sörling Valley to Barff Point, its farthest extremity. It was probably first seen by the British expedition under James Cook in 1775. The peninsula as a whole takes its name from Barff Point, which was named for Royal Navy Lieutenant A.D. Barff of HMS Sappho, who, assisted by Captain C.A. Larsen, sketched a map of Cumberland Bay in 1906. Barff Point is considered the eastern headland of East Cumberland Bay.

== Named features ==
The coastline of Barff Peninsula is irregular and marked by indented bays and coves, with headlands and points projecting out into the sea. Many of these features have been charted and named.

Cave Point is a headland lying 0.5 nautical miles (1 km) southwest of Barff Point. The name appears to be first used on a 1929 British Admiralty chart.

=== Northeast coast to Godthul ===
North off Barff Point, .25 nmi (0.46 km) from the coast, are the Right Whale Rocks, separated from the point by Merton Passage. The name Merton was originally given to the rocks by personnel of Sappho in 1906, but was reassigned to the passage by Discovery Investigations (DI) personnel as a result of surveys during the period 1926–30. 1.5 nmi (3 km) east-southeast off the coast of Barff Point is Alert Rock, a submerged rock marked by breakers. It was charted in 1929 by DI personnel, who named it after the Alert, a small motor launch used during the survey.

Continuing east along the coast, the next major feature is Cape Douglas. It was charted by DI in 1926–1930 and probably named after Sir Henry Percy Douglas, a member of the Discovery Committee, 1928–1939. Mills Peak stands inland 1 nmi (1.9 km) southwest. Cape Douglas ends at Lucas Point, which marks the west side of a small bay called Rookery Bay, bordered on the east by Rookery Point. The bay and its headlands appear to be first named on a 1930 British Admiralty chart. The Skrap Skerries, a group of small islands and rocks, are situated off the coast just north of Rookery Bay. Martin Valley trends northeast–southwest across the peninsula from Rookery Bay to Cumberland East Bay. It was originally called "Three Lakes Valley", but to avoid confusion with Three Lakes Valley on Signy Island, it was renamed by UK Antarctic Place-Names Committee (UK-APC) in 1988, after Stephen J. Martin, British Antarctic Survey Station Commander at Grytviken.

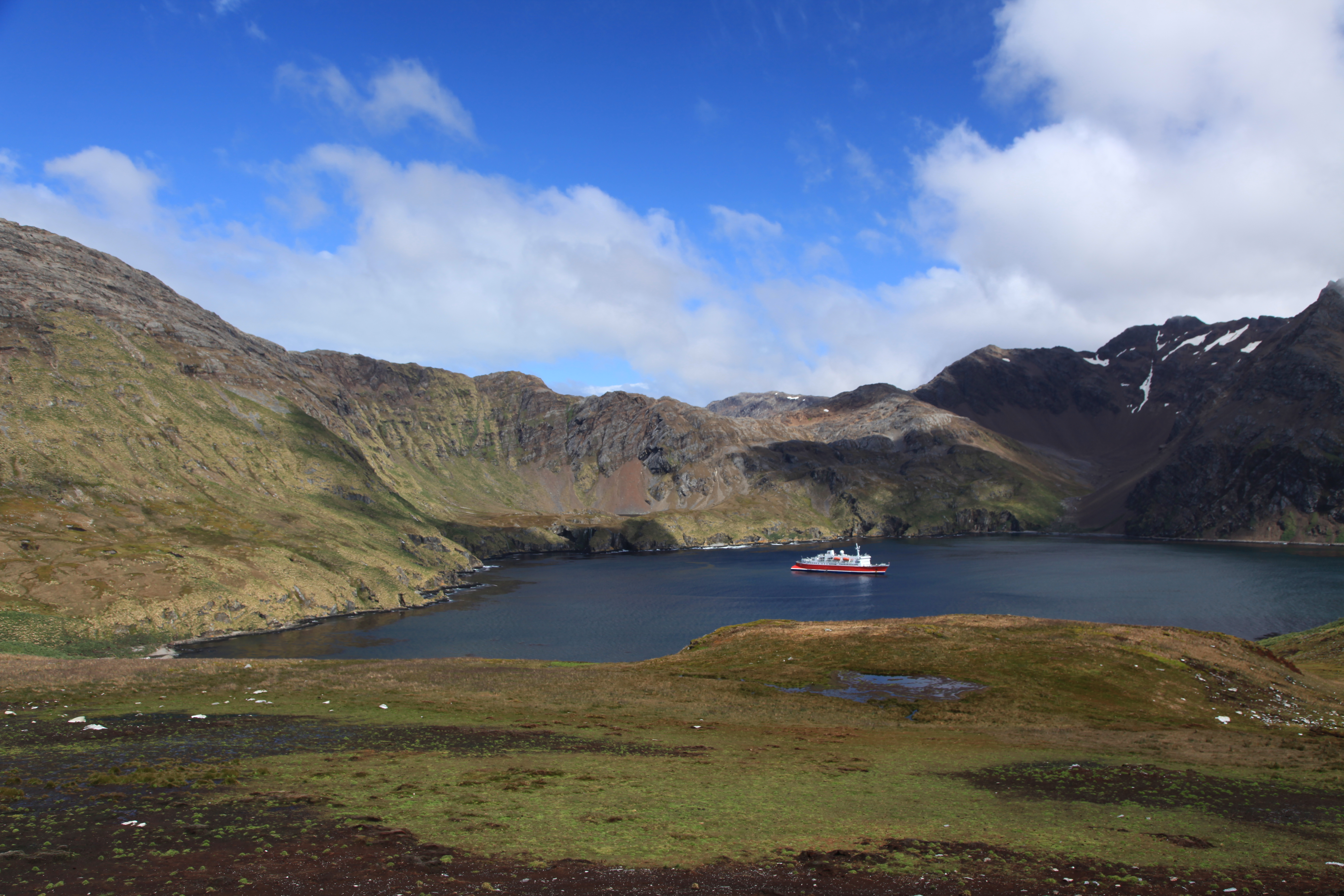
MS Expedition at Godthul

East of Rookery Point, Skua Point, first named on a 1930 British Admiralty chart, marks the western extent of Cobblers Cove, a small cove providing an anchorage. Babe Island lies in the entrance to the cove, with The Cut separating the island from Cobblers Cove. Both were charted by DI personnel in 1929, who named the cove "Pleasant Cove". The South Georgia Survey (SGS) of 1951–1952 reported that this feature was known to whalers and sealers as Skomaker Hullet, because it was first entered in thick fog by a Norwegian gunner who had once been a cobbler. An English form of this name, Cobblers Cove, was approved. To the south, Long Point divides Cobblers Cove from Godthul. It was charted in 1928 by a Norwegian expedition under Harald Horntvedt, then recharted in 1929 by DI personnel, who named the point for Walter Hume Long. O'Connor Peak stands inland to the west of Long Point.

=== South of Godthul ===
Godthul, meaning "good hollow" in Norwegian, is a bay 1 mile (1.6 km) long entered between Long Point to the north and Cape George to the south. It once served as a whaling station. Szielasko Ice Cap sits on the south edge of the harbor. Briggs Point projects into Godthul from its eastern shore, dividing it from Alsford Bay to the east. The name appears on a DI chart from 1929, and is probably for A.C. Briggs, a member of the DI survey party. Alsford is a small bay between Briggs Point and Cape George, charted by DI in 1929 and named after Stoker W.B. Alsford, of RRS Discovery, a member of the survey party.

Reindeer Valley cuts southwest across the peninsula between the head of Godthul and Sandebugten in Cumberland East Bay. It was surveyed by the SGS between 1951 and 1957, and named by UK-APC because Norwegian whalers introduced reindeer into this part of the island in 1909.

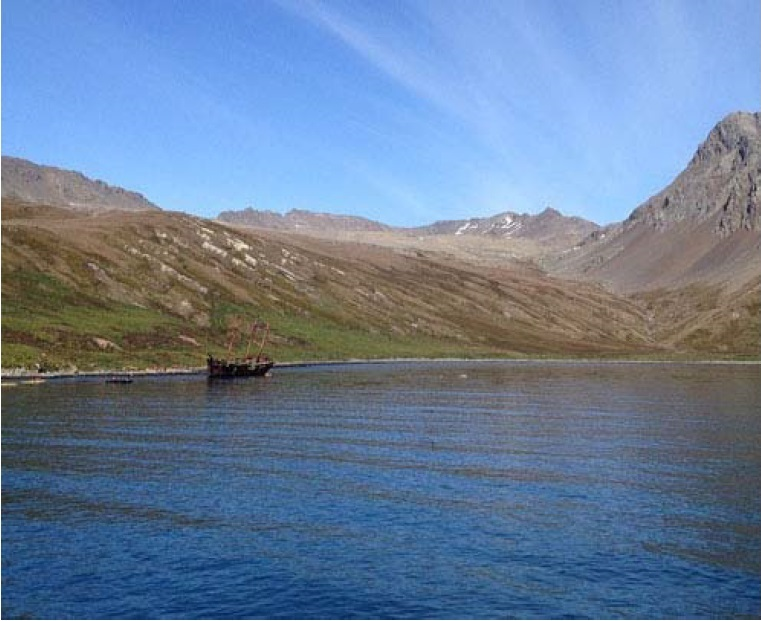
The wreck of Bayard in Ocean Harbour in 2014

Cape George was discovered in 1775 during the second voyage of Captain James Cook, who named it for George III of the United Kingdom. Tucked south of it is Horseshoe Bay, .5 nmi (0.93 km) wide, first charted by DI personnel. East-southeast of the cape is a rocky ridge called Nansen Reef, submerged to a depth of about 6 ft 7 in (2 m). It was named after SS Fridtjof Nansen, which struck this reef and sank on 10 November 1906.

Continuing southward, the next major feature is Johannsen Loch, a cove 0.7 nmi (1.3 km) long. The name first appears on a DI chart, but may reflect an earlier naming. Ocean Harbour, a former whaling station, sits 1 nmi (2 km) to the south. Kelp-infested Penguin Bay lies just southeast. Its name first appears on a 1931 British Admiralty chart.

To the south, prominent Tijuca Point forms the northwest side of the entrance of Hound Bay on the north coast of South Georgia. The name Penguin Point was probably applied to this feature by DI personnel in 1930. Following the SGS, it was recommended that the name be altered to avoid confusion with other features named for penguins. The name Tijuca Point was given by UK-APC for Tijuca, a three-masted barque built at Nantes in 1866.
