= O'Connor Peak =

Mountain in South Georgia

O'Connor Peak (54°16′S 36°19′W) is a mountain peak, 675 m, standing west of Long Point on Barff Peninsula, South Georgia. Charted by a Norwegian Antarctic Expedition, 1927–28, and named Mount Bryde. Recharted by DI in 1929 and named after Midshipman W. P. O'Connor, Royal Navy Reserve, who assisted with the survey.
