= Skrap Skerries =

The Skrap Skerries (54°15′S 36°19′W) are two small groups of islands and rocks (skerries) lying midway between Cape George and Barff Point, close off the northern coast of the Barff Peninsula of South Georgia Island in Antarctica. The Skerries are divided into the West Skerry, 3.2 mi (5.1 km) east of Barff Point, and the East Skerry, 2 mi (3.2 km) northwest of Cape George. The present name for this pair of skerries appears on a chart based upon a survey of this area by Discovery Investigations personnel in the period 1926–30, but it may reflect earlier terms "skrapskjaer" or "skrapskjar" used by Norwegian whalers.
