= Hansen Point =

Headland in South Georgia

Hansen Point (54°8′S 36°41′W) is a point lying between Factory Point and Harbour Point on the west side of Leith Harbour, Stromness Bay, on the north coast of South Georgia. The name appears on a chart showing the results of surveys by Discovery Investigations personnel in 1927 and 1929, and is probably for Leganger Hansen, the manager of the whaling station at Leith Harbour at that time.
