= Coronda Peak =

Mountain in South Georgia

Coordinates: 54°7′S 36°41′W

Coronda Peak is a peak over 610 metres (2,000 ft) high, standing north of Leith Harbour on the north coast of South Georgia. The name appears on a chart showing the results of surveys by Discovery Investigations personnel in 1927 and 1929, and is probably after the SS Coronda whose captain was of assistance to the survey party.
