= Reindeer River (disambiguation) =

Reindeer River is an archaic alternate name for the Klondike River

Reindeer River may also refer to:

- Reindeer River (Saskatchewan), a 100-kilometre (62 mi) river that flows south from Reindeer Lake to the Churchill River, Saskatchewan, Canada
- Reindeer River (Paimiut Slough), a 105-kilometre (65 mi) river that is part of the Yukon River Drainage Basin; see List of rivers of Alaska, U.S.A.
- Reindeer River (Yukon River), a 97-kilometre (60 mi) river that is part of the Yukon River Drainage Basin; see List of rivers of Alaska, U.S.A.
- Reindeer River, the river noted as the Klondike River in the 1901 Collier Weekly fiction story "A Relic of the Pliocene" (collected in The Faith of Men, 1904) by Jack London
- Reina Elv (lit. 'Reindeer River'), a river near Bagn in Sør-Aurdal Municipality in Innlandet county, Norway

== See also ==
- Reindeer (disambiguation)
