= Godthul =

Coordinates: 54°17′S 36°18′W

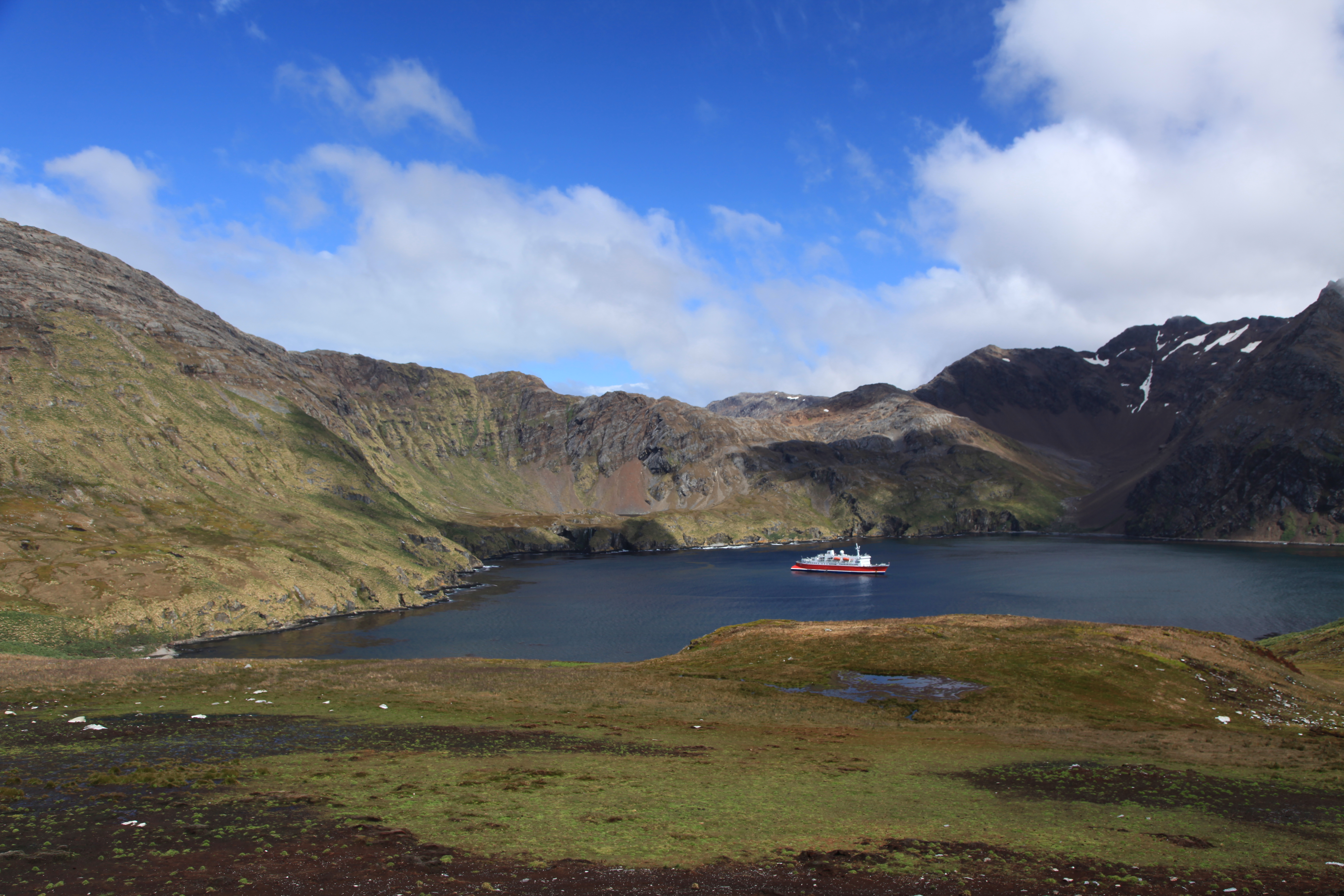
M/S Expedition at Godthul

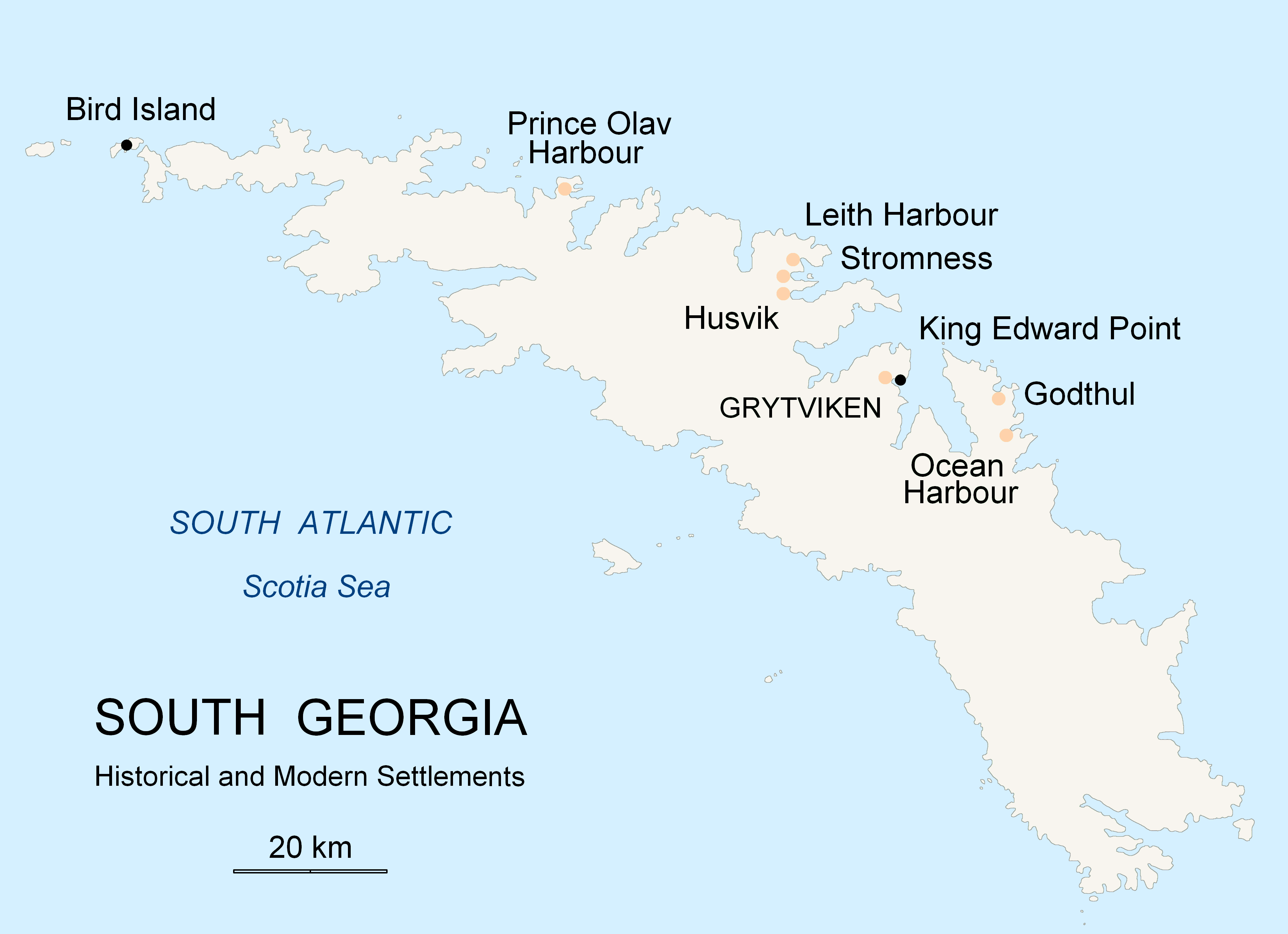
Historical and modern settlements of South Georgia Island, showing Godthul

Godthul (Spanish: Buen Arroyo) is a bay 1 mile (1.6 km) long entered between Cape George and Long Point, on the east side of Barff Peninsula on the north coast of South Georgia Island. It sits between Rookery Bay to the north and Johannsen Loch to the south. Szielasko Ice Cap sits on the south edge of the harbor. The name Godthul (Norwegian for "Good Hollow") dates back to the period 1905–12, and was probably applied by Norwegian sealers and whalers working in the area.

Godthul was used as a whaling station between 1908 and 1929. It had basic infrastructure supported by factory ships, but no land station.
