= Reindeer Lake (disambiguation) =

Reindeer Lake may refer to:

- Reindeer Lake, on the border between Saskatchewan and Manitoba, Canada

- Reindeer Lake/Lindbergh Lodge Aerodrome, an airport on an island in Reindeer Lake, Saskatchewan, Canada

- Reinsvatnet (Reindeer Lake), large mountainous lake west of Mellsjøen lake, northeast of Lillehammer, Oppland county, Norway
- Reinsvatnet (Reindeer Lake) (Reinsvatnet R1), paleo-postglacial lake of the Younger Dryas with human and reindeer archaeological evidence, Sunndal Mountains, Møre og Romsdal county, Norway
- Reinevatn (Reindeer Lake), small lake in Bykle, Aust-Agder county, Norway
- Reingardslivatnet (Reindeer Lake; Reindeer Farm Lake), small lake in Rana, Nordland county, Norway
- Reinoksvatnet (Reindeer Lake), small lake in Hamarøy, Nordland county, Norway
- Reindeer Lake, small lake near Fairbanks, North Star Borough, Alaska, U.S.A.; see List of lakes in Alaska
- Stor-Rensjön (Great Reindeer Lake), 5th deepest lake in Sweden; see List of lakes in Sweden

== See also ==
- Reindeer (disambiguation)
