= Reindeer Island (disambiguation) =

Reindeer Island may refer to:

- Reindeer Island, Lake Winnipeg, Manitoba, Canada
- Reindeer Island (Île aux Rennes), also known as Île Australia, Kerguelen Islands, Antarctic Ocean
- Reindeer Island, Alaska, United States of America; see List of islands of Alaska
- Reindeer Island, a 1960 children's book by Olive Price

== See also ==
- Reindeer (disambiguation)
