= The Cut (South Georgia) =

The Cut (54°16′S 36°18′W) is a shallow, rock-strewn channel between Babe Island and the west side of the entrance to Cobblers Cove, along the north coast of South Georgia. Charted and named in 1929 by DI personnel.

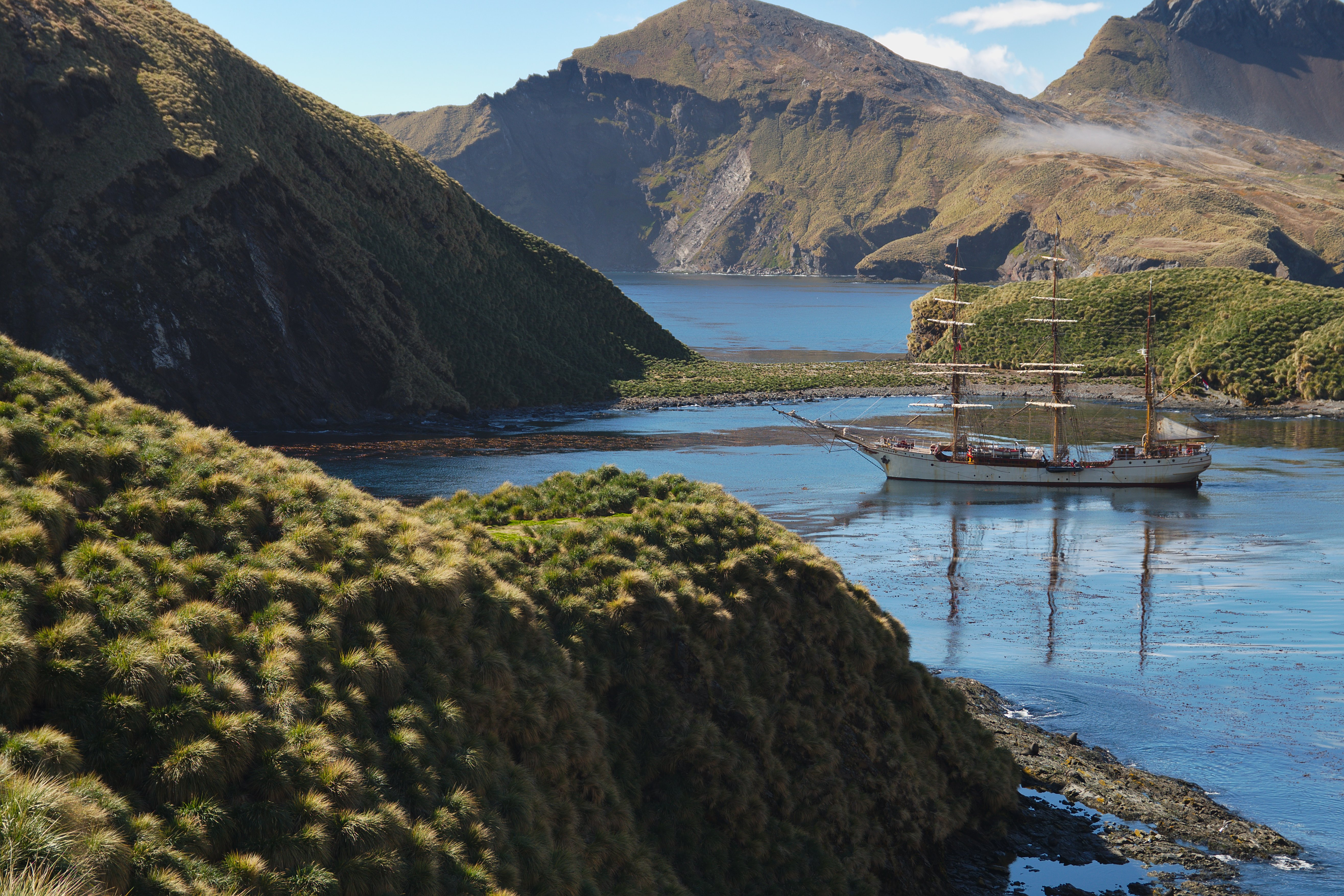
Ship in The Cut, 30 November 2016
