= Reindeer distribution =

Reindeer distribution around the world

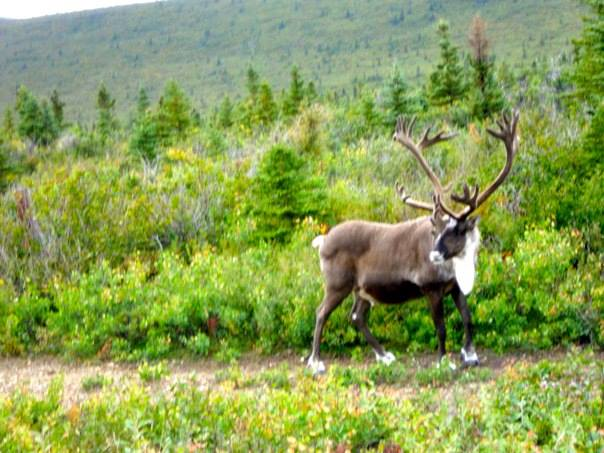
Male caribou, Fort Greely, Alaska

Approximate geographical distribution of reindeer and of the major migratory herds. 1. Western Arctic herd (R.t. granti). 2. Porcupine herd (R.t. granti). 3. Bluenose herd (R.t. groenlandicus). 4. Bathurst herd (R.t. groenlandicus). 5. Beverly herd (R.t. groenlandicus). 6. Qamanirjuaq herd (R.t. groenlandicus). 7. Leaf River herd (R.t. caribou). 8. George River herd (R.t. caribou). 9. Taimyr Peninsula herd (R.t. tarandus). 10. Lena-Olenek herd (R.t. tarandus). 11. Yana-Indigirka herd (R.t. tarandus). 12. Sundrum herd (R.t. tarandus).

The reindeer (caribou in North America) is a widespread and numerous species in the northern Holarctic, being present in both tundra and taiga (boreal forest). Originally, the reindeer was found in Scandinavia, eastern Europe, Russia, Mongolia, and northern China north of the 50th latitude. In North America, it was found in Canada, Alaska (United States), and the northern contiguous USA from Washington to Maine. In the 19th century, it was apparently still present in southern Idaho. It also occurred naturally on Sakhalin, Greenland, and probably even in historical times in Ireland.

During the late Pleistocene era, reindeer were found further south, such as at Nevada, Tennessee, and Alabama in North America and Spain in Europe. Today, wild reindeer have disappeared from many areas within this large historical range, especially from the southern parts, where it vanished almost everywhere. Populations of wild reindeer are still found in Norway, Finland, Siberia, Greenland, Alaska, and Canada.

The George River reindeer herd in the tundra of Quebec and Labrador in eastern Canada, once numbered world's largest 800,000–900,000 animals, stands December 2011 at 74,000—a drop of up to 92% because of Iron-ore mining, flooding for hydropower and road building.

Domesticated reindeer are mostly found in northern Fennoscandia and Russia, with a herd of approximately 150–170 semi-domesticated reindeer living around the Cairngorms region in Scotland. Although formerly more widespread in Scandinavia, the last remaining wild mountain reindeer in Europe are found in portions of southern Norway. Siberian tundra reindeer are widespread in Russia.

A few reindeer from Norway were introduced to the South Atlantic island of South Georgia in the beginning of the 20th century. The South Georgian reindeer totaled some estimated 2600 animals in two distinct herds separated by glaciers. Although the flag and the coat of arms of the territory contain an image of a reindeer, they were eradicated from 2013 to 2017 because of the environmental damage they caused. Around 4000 reindeer have been introduced into the French sub-Antarctic archipelago of Kerguelen Islands. East Iceland has a small herd of about 2,500–3,000 animals.

Caribou and reindeer numbers have fluctuated historically, but many herds are in decline across their range. This global decline is linked to climate change for northern, migratory caribou and reindeer herds and industrial disturbance of caribou habitat for sedentary, non-migratory herds.

== Russia ==
In 2013, the Taimyr herd in Russia was the largest herd in the world. In 2000, the herd increased to 1,000,000 but by 2009, there were 700,000 animals. In the 1950s, there were 110,000.

There are three large herds of migratory tundra wild reindeer in central Siberia's Yakutia region: the Lena-Olenek, Yana-Indigirka and Sundrun herds. While the population of the Lena-Olenek herd is stable, the others are declining.

Further east again, the Chukotka herd is also in decline. In 1971, there were 587,000 animals. They recovered after a severe decline in 1986, to only 32,200 individuals, but their numbers fell again. According to Kolpashikov, by 2009 there were less than 70,000.

== North America ==
Approximate range of caribou subspecies in North America in 2003. Overlap is possible for contiguous range. 1. Rangifer tarandus caribou, which is subdivided into ecotypes: woodland (boreal), woodland (migratory) and woodland (montane), 2. R. t. dawsoni (extinct 1908), 3. R. t. R. t. groenlandicus 4. R. t. groenlandicus, 5. R. t. groenlandicus, 6. R. t. pearyi

Until a recent revision, there were six living subspecies of the reindeer (Rangifer tarandus), known in North America as the caribou: woodland (boreal), R. t. caribou; Labrador or Ungava caribou, R. t. caboti; Newfoundland caribou, R. t. terranovae; barren-ground caribou, R. t. groenlandicus (including the Porcupine, Dolphin-Union and other Alaskan and Canadian herds of barren-ground caribou); Osborn's caribou, R. t. oborni; and Peary caribou, R. t. pearyi.

In Canada, the Committee on Status of Endangered Wildlife in Canada (COSEWIC) defined 12 "designatable units", DU, which included the above named subspecies and several ecotypes: Peary caribou DU1, the Dolphin-Union herd of barren-ground caribou DU2, mainland barren-ground (including Alaskan) caribou DU3, Labrador caribou ("eastern migratory") caribou DU4, Newfoundland caribou DU5, boreal woodland caribou DU6, Osborn's caribou ("northern mountain") DU7, Rocky Mountain caribou ("central mountain") DU8, Selkirk Mountain caribou DU9 ("southern mountain"), Torngat Mountain DU10 (an ecotype of Labrador caribou), Atlantic-Gaspésie DU11 (a montane ecotype of woodland caribou) and the extinct Dawson's caribou DU2. Genetic research has shown that Osborn's caribou and the other two western montane ecotypes are of Beringian-Eurasian ancestry (but distantly, having diverged > 60,000 years ago) and therefore not closely relate to woodland caribou. While useful for conservation and research, Designatable units, an adaptation of "evolutionary significant units", are not phylogenetically based and cannot substitute for taxonomy.

In North America, because of its vast range in a wide diversity of ecosystems, the woodland caribou is further distinguished by a number of ecotypes. In the Ungava region of Quebec, several herds of Labrador caribou in the north, such as the large George River caribou herd, overlap in range with the boreal woodland caribou to the south.

A recent revision returned Woodland caribou to species status, R. caribou, with subspecies Labrador or Ungava caribou, R. c. caboti, the migratory form; Newfoundland caribou, R. c. terranovae; and Boreal woodland caribou, R. c. caribou. The revision returned the name of Arctic caribou to its original R. arcticus, with the nominate subspecies being barren-ground caribou, R. a. arcticus, and returned four western montane ecotypes to subspecies of Arctic caribou: Selkirk Mountain caribou, R. a. montanus, Rocky Mountain caribou, R. a. fortidens, Osborn's caribou, R. a. osborni, and Stone's caribou, R. a. stonei, in accordance with molecular data that showed these to be of Beringian-Eurasian ancestry.

Some caribou populations are "endangered in Canada in regions such as southeastern British Columbia at the Canadian-USA border, along the Columbia, Kootenay and Kootenai rivers and around Kootenay Lake. Selkirk Mountain caribou (formerly thought to be an ecotype of woodland caribou, Rangifer tarandus caribou) was considered endangered in the United States in Idaho and Washington. R. t. pearyi is on the IUCN endangered list. The woodland caribou is highly endangered throughout its distribution.

=== United States ===
All U.S. caribou populations are in Alaska. There was also a remnant population of about a dozen caribou in the Selkirk Mountains of Idaho, which were the only remaining wild caribou in the contiguous United States. In 2018 there were three left; the last member, a female, was transported to a wildlife rehab center in Canada, thus marking the extirpation of the caribou from the Lower 48.

==== Alaska ====
There are four migratory herds of barren-ground caribou, R. tarandus groenlandicus, in Alaska: the Western Arctic herd, the Teshekpuk Lake herd, the Central Arctic herd and the Porcupine caribou herd (named for a river that flows from Yukon into Alaska), the last of which is transnational as its migratory range extends far into Canada's north. The largest is the Western Arctic caribou herd, but the smaller Porcupine herd has the longest migration of any terrestrial mammal on Earth with a vast historical range. There are also about 20 montane herds in the south and east, recently returned to their former name, R. a. stonei, that move seasonally within their small ranges, but to not migrate per se; and one nearly insular herd on the western end of the Alaska Peninsula and nearby islands, originally described as R. granti. Phylogenetic analysis shows that Grant's caribou clusters separately from all other Alaskan caribou and does not interbreed with nearby caribou ecotypes.

===== Porcupine caribou herd =====
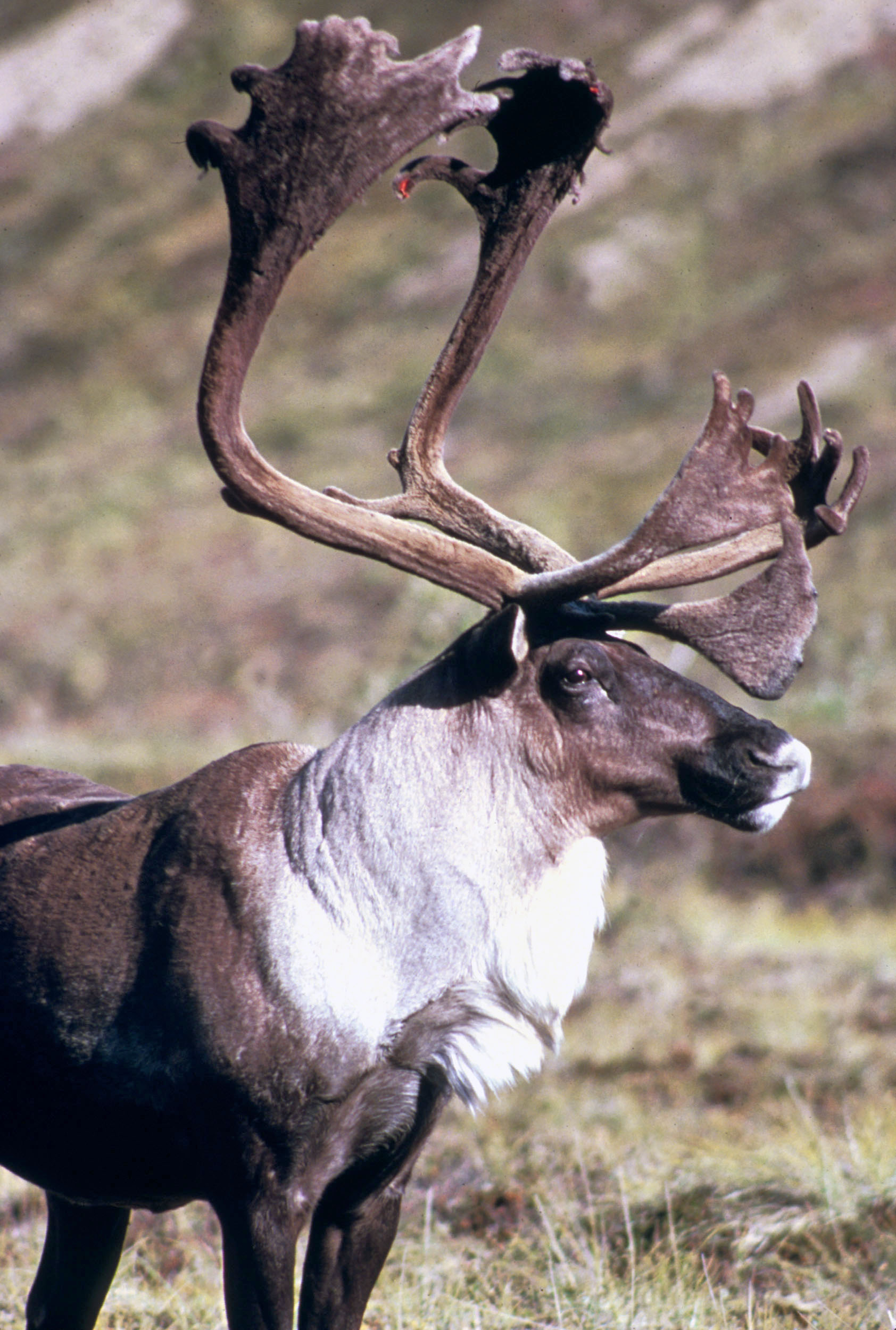
Male Porcupine caribou (R. t. groenlandicus) in Alaska, 2005 or earlier

The Porcupine caribou herd is transnational and migratory. The herd is named after their birthing grounds, for example, the Porcupine River, which runs through a large part of the range of the Porcupine herd. Individual herds of migratory caribou once had over a million animals per herd and could take over ten days to cross the Yukon River, but these numbers dramatically declined with habitat disturbance and degradation. Though numbers fluctuate, the herd comprises approximately 169,000 animals (based on a July 2010 photocensus). The Porcupine herd's annual migrations of 1,500 miles (2,400 km) are among the longest of any terrestrial mammal. Its range spans approximately 260,000 km^{2} (64,000,000 acres), from Aklavik, Northwest Territories to Dawson City, Yukon to Kaktovik, Alaska on the Beaufort Sea. The Porcupine caribou (R. tarandus groenlandicus—originally named Tarandus rangifer ogilviensis Millais 1915 after the Ogilvie Mountains, their Yukon winter range; has a vast range that includes northeastern Alaska and the Yukon and is therefore cooperatively managed by government agencies and aboriginal peoples from both countries. The Gwich'in people followed the Porcupine herd—their primary source of food, tools, and clothing—for thousands of years—according to oral tradition, for as long as 20,000 years. They continued their nomadic lifestyle until the 1870s. This herd is also traditional food for the Inupiat, the Inuvialuit, the Hän, and the Northern Tutchone. There is currently controversy over whether possible future oil drilling on the coastal plains of the Arctic National Wildlife Refuge, encompassing much of the Porcupine caribou calving grounds, will have a severe negative impact on the caribou population or whether the caribou population will grow.

Unlike many other barren-ground caribou, the Porcupine caribou is stable at relatively high numbers, but the 2013 photo census was not counted by January 2014. The peak population in 1989 of 178,000 animals was followed by a decline by 2001 to 123,000. By 2010, it recovered to 169,000.

Many Gwich'in people, who depend on the Porcupine herd, still follow traditional caribou management practices that include a 1981 prohibition against selling caribou meat and limits on the number of caribou to be taken per hunting trip.

===== Western Arctic caribou herd (WACH) =====
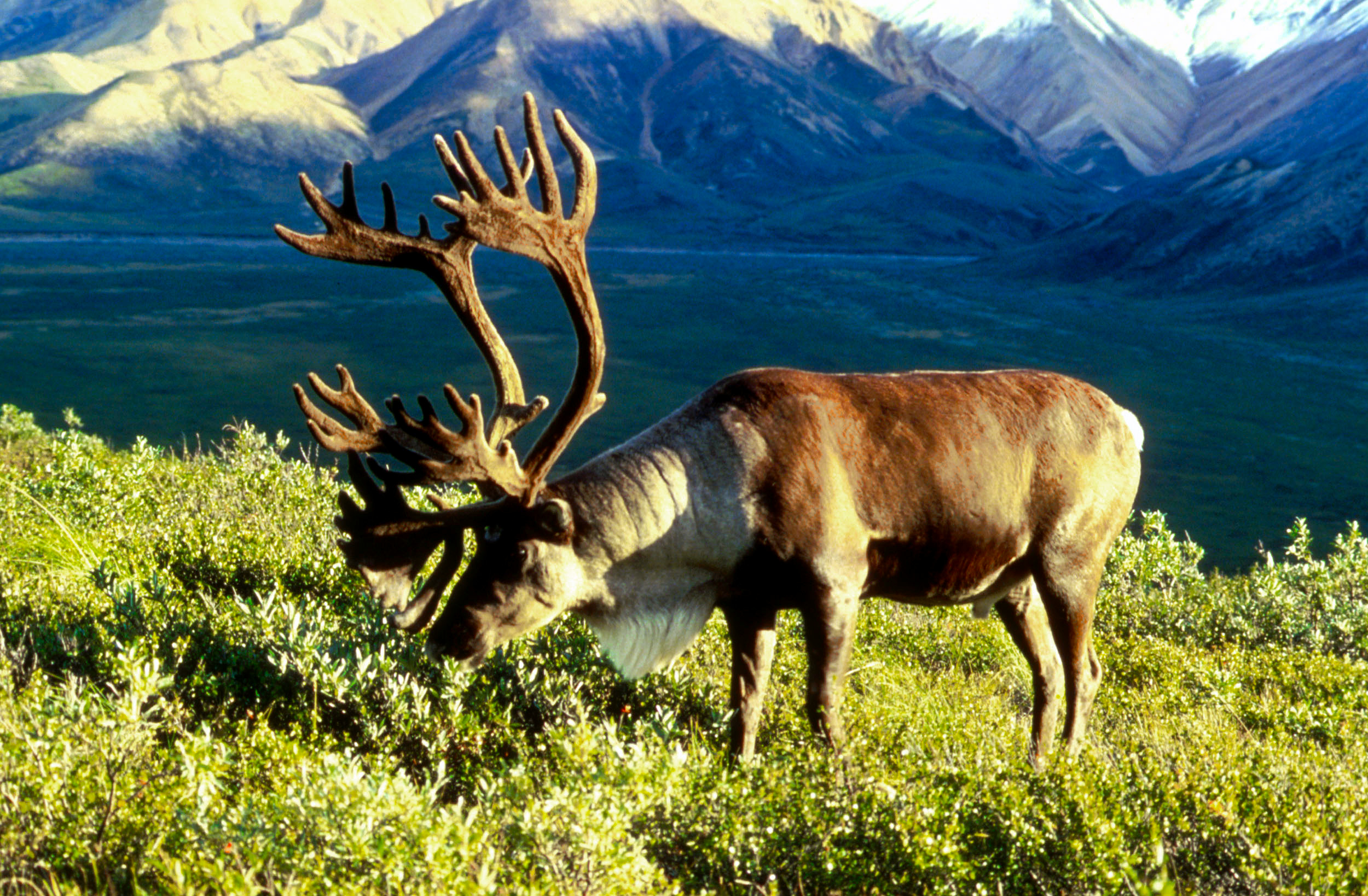
A large bull reindeer in Alaska, 2006 or earlier

The Western Arctic caribou herd is the largest of the three Alaskan barren-ground caribou herds. The Western Arctic herd reached a low of 75,000 in the mid-1970s. In 1997 the 90,000 WACH changed their migration and wintered on Seward Peninsula. Alaska's reindeer herding industry has been concentrated on Seward Peninsula ever since the first shipment of reindeer was imported from eastern Siberia in 1892 as part of the Reindeer Project, an initiative to replace whale meat in the diet of the indigenous people of the region. For many years it was believed that the geography of the peninsula would prevent migrating caribou from mingling with domesticated reindeer who might otherwise join caribou herds when they left an area. In 1997, the domesticated reindeer joined the Western Arctic caribou herd on their summer migration and disappeared. The WACH reached a peak of 490,000 in 2003 and then declined to 325,000 in 2011.

====== Teshekpuk Lake and Central Arctic caribou herds ======
North Slopes, Alaska

In 2008, the Teshekpuk Lake caribou herd had 64,107 animals and the Central Arctic caribou herd had 67,000.

By 2017, the Teshekpuk herd's numbers, whose calving grounds are in the region of the shallow Teshekpuk Lake, had declined to 41,000 animals. Teshekpuk Lake in the North Slope is in the traditional lands of the Iñupiat, who depended on the Teshekpuk herd for millennia. Teshekpuk Lake is also in the National Petroleum Reserve-Alaska, where the U.S. Department of the Interior (DOI) had approved oil and gas drilling on 11 January 2006. The NPR-A is the "single largest parcel of public land in the United States" covering about 23 million acres (93,000 square kilometres). The reserve's eastern border sits about 100 miles (160 km) to the west of the more famous Arctic National Wildlife Refuge. The leasing of Teshekpuk Lake land to industry was protested by the Iñupiat and others who sent 300,000 letters to the US Secretary of the Interior and the ConocoPhillips CEO over the summer of 2006. On 25 September 2006, the U.S. District Court for the District of Alaska protected the wildlife habitat around the lake from an oil and gas lease sale.

In October 2017, U. S. Secretary of the Interior, Ryan Zinke, announced that as of 6 December 2017, lands under the administration of the U.S. Bureau of Land Management will be up for bid on the "largest offering of public lands for lease in the history of the [BLM]—10.3 million acres [42,000 square kilometres]". The Prudhoe Bay Oil Field, near Prudhoe Bay, Alaska, is situated between the Arctic National Wildlife Refuge to the east. Industry will be allowed to run "roads, pipelines and drill rigs" in the very sensitive habitat areas, including the Teshekpuk caribou herd calving grounds. The Teshekpuk herd remains at the calving grounds for several weeks in spring before moving from Teshekpuk Lake for relief from mosquitoes and botflies before their annual migration.

===== Reindeer imported to Alaska =====
Reindeer were imported from Siberia in the late 19th century and from Norway in the early 1900s as semi-domesticated livestock in Alaska. Reindeer can interbreed with the native caribou subspecies, but they rarely do, and even then their offspring do not survive well in the wild.

=== Canada ===
==== Nunavut ====
The barren-ground caribou (R. t. groenlandicus), a long-distance migrant, includes large herds in the Northwest Territories and in Nunavut, for example, the Beverly, the Ahiak and Qamanirjuaq herds. In 1996, the population of the Ahiak herd was approximately 250,000 animals.

===== Ahiak, Beverly and Qamanirjuaq caribou herds =====
The Ahiak, Beverly and Qamanirjuaq caribou herds are all barren-ground caribou.

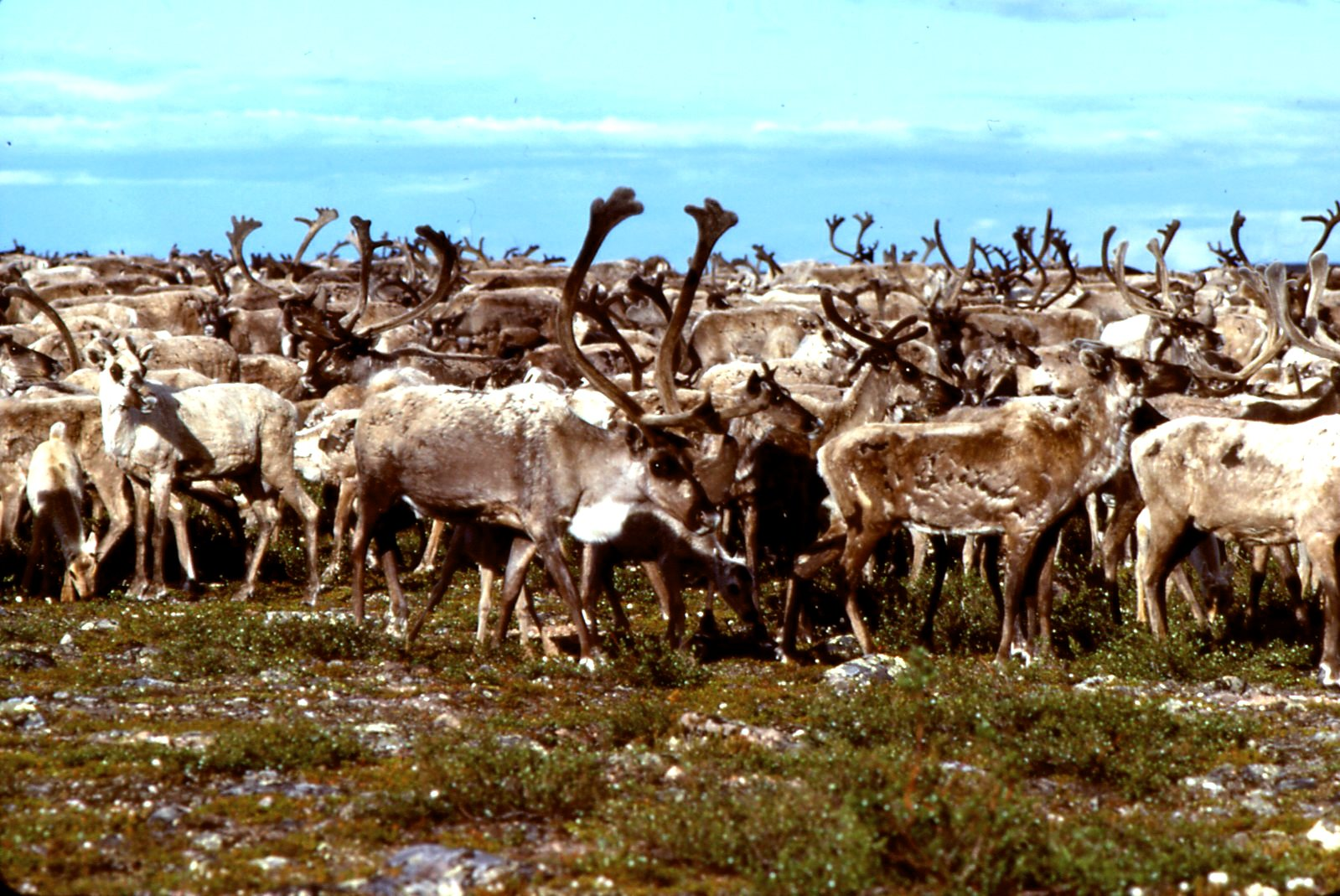
The Beverly herd of barren-ground caribou, Thelon River, Nunavut, 1978.

"The Beverly herd's crossing of the Thelon River to its traditional calving grounds near Beverly Lake was part of the lives of the Dene aboriginal people for 8,000 years, as revealed by an unbroken archaeological record of deep layers of caribou bones and stone tools in the banks of the Thelon River (Gordon 2005)." The Beverly herd (located primarily in Saskatchewan, Northwest Territories; with portions in Nunavut, Manitoba and Alberta) and the Qamanirjuaq Herd (located primarily in Manitoba, Nunavut; with portions in the southeastern NWT and northeastern Saskatchewan) fall under the auspices of the Beverly and Qamanirjuaq Caribou Management Board. The Beverly herd, whose range spans the tundra from northern Manitoba and Saskatchewan and well into the Northwest Territories and Nunavut, had a peak population in 1994 of 276,000 or 294,000, but by 2011 there were approximately 124,000 caribou in the Beverly herd and 83,300 in the Ahiak herd. The calving grounds of the Beverly herd are located around Queen Maud Gulf, but the herd shifted its traditional birthing area. Caribou management agencies are concerned that deterioration and disturbance of habitat along with "parasites, predation and poor weather" are contributing to a cycling down of most caribou populations. It was suggested the Ahiak and Beverly herds switched calving grounds and the Beverly may have moved "near the western Queen Maud Gulf coast to the north of the herd's "traditional" calving ground in the Gary Lakes area north of Baker Lake." The "Beverly herd may have declined (similar to other Northwest Territories herds), and cows switched to the neighbouring Ahiak herd to maintain the advantages of gregarious calving." By 2011 there were approximately 124,000 caribou in the combined Beverly/Ahiak herd which represents a "50% or a 75% decline from the 1994 population estimate for the Beverly Herd."

The barren-ground caribou population on Southampton Island, Nunavut declined by almost 75%, from about 30,000 caribou in 1997 to 7,800 caribou in 2011.

===== Peary caribou =====
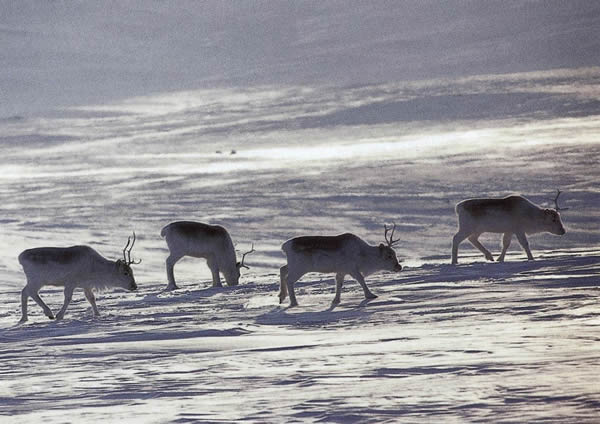
The Peary caribou (R. t. pearyi) is a relatively small and pale subspecies found in the tundra of far northern North America. Unsurprisingly, it is part of the group known as tundra reindeer.

The Peary caribou (R. t. pearyi), the smallest subspecies in North America, known as tuktu in Inuktitut, are found in the northern islands of Nunavut (except Baffin Island) and the Northwest Territories. In northwestern Greenland, Peary caribou may occur as vagrants, crossing from Ellesmere Island in the winter. The current total Peary caribou population is estimated at 13,200 mature individuals, up from an estimated 5,400 mature individuals in 1996 but down from approximately 22,000 in 1987 after severe declines.

A population of barren-ground caribou (R. t. groenlandicus) summers on Victoria Island and crosses the ice of Dolphin and Union Strait to the lands around Coronation Gulf for winter. Once thought to be hybrids or intergrades with Peary caribou, they are now known to be a barren-ground caribou named after the strait that they migrate across: Dolphin-Union caribou. Further research showed that some R. t. pearyi × groenlandicus hybrids occur on Banks Island and the northwest corner of Victoria Island.

The Inglefield Land caribou population in northwestern Greenland was formerly thought as being intergrades between barren-ground caribou and Peary caribou, although research has concluded the population does not regularly exchange genes with Peary caribou.

==== Baffin Island caribou ====
On Baffin Island, the largest Arctic island, the population of barren-ground caribou (R. t. groenlandicus) peaked in the early 1990s to approximately 60,000 to 180,000. By 2012, in northern Baffin Island caribou numbers were considered to be at a "low in the cycle after a high in the 1990s" and in southern Baffin Island, the population was estimated as between 1,065 and 2,067. Baffin Island caribou are highly divergent from other barren-ground caribou, have a different mating system, lack migratory and aggregation behaviors, and have morphological differences.

==== The Northwest Territories ====
There are four barren-ground caribou herds in the Northwest Territories—the Cape Bathurst, Bluenose West, Bluenose East and Bathurst herds. The Bluenose East caribou herd began a recovery with a population of approximately 122,000 in 2010, which is being credited to the establishment of Tuktut Nogait National Park. According to T. Davison 2010, CARMA 2011, the three other herds "declined 84–93% from peak sizes in the mid-1980s and 1990s.

==== R. t. caribou ====
The Committee on Status of Endangered Wildlife in Canada (COSEWIC) divided woodland caribou (R. tarandus caribou) ecotypes into five "Designatable Units" (DU) as noted above. Caribou are classified by ecotype depending on several behavioral factors—predominant habitat use (northern, tundra, mountain, forest, boreal forest, forest-dwelling), spacing (dispersed or aggregated) and migration patterns (sedentary or migratory).

In Canada, the national meta-population of the sedentary boreal woodland ecotype spans the boreal forest from the Northwest Territories to Labrador. They prefer lichen-rich mature forests and mainly live in marshes, bogs, lakes and river regions. The historic range of the boreal woodland caribou covered over half of present-day Canada, stretching from Alaska to Newfoundland and Labrador and as far south as New England, Idaho and Washington. Woodland caribou have disappeared from most of their original southern range and only about 34,000 remain. The boreal woodland caribou was designated as threatened in 2002.

===== George River caribou herd (GRCH) =====
The migratory George River caribou herd (GRCH), in the Ungava region of Quebec and Labrador in eastern Canada was once the world's largest caribou herd with 800,000–900,000 animals. It is a herd of Labrador caribou, Rangifer tarandus caboti. The GRCH is the migratory woodland caribou and, like the barren-ground caribou, its ecotype may be tundra caribou, Arctic, northern or migratory, not forest-dwelling and sedentary like most woodland caribou ecotypes. It is unlike most woodland caribou in that it is not sedentary. Since the mid-1990s, the herd declined sharply and by 2010, it was reduced to 74,131—a drop of up to 92%. A 2011 survey confirms a continuing decline of the George River caribou herd population. By 2018 it was estimated to be fewer than 9,000 animals as reported by the Canadian Broadcasting Corporation, down from 385,000 in 2001 and 74,131 in 2010.

===== Leaf River caribou herd (LRCH) =====
Leaf River caribou herd

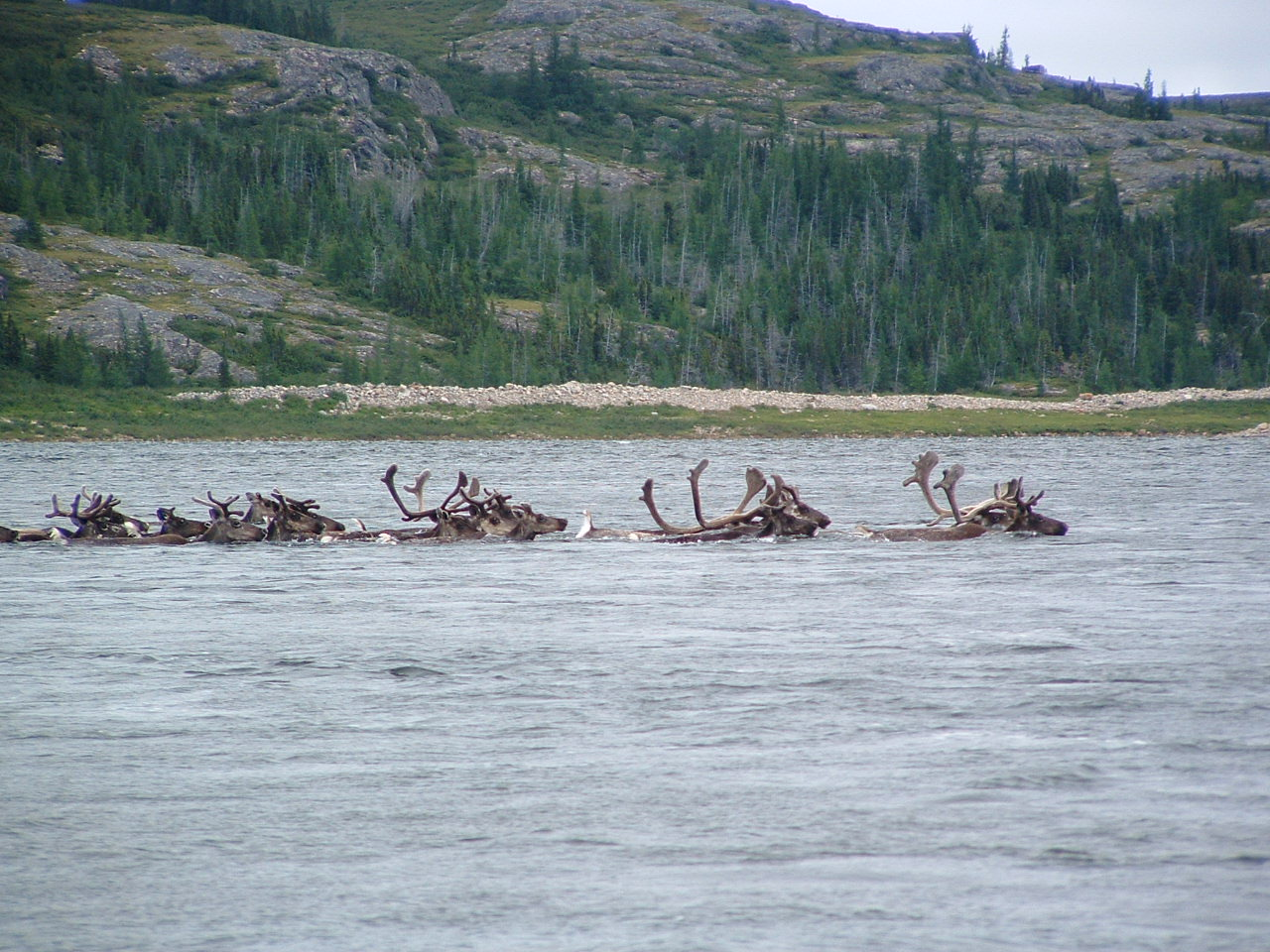
Caribou crossing Leaf River

The Leaf River caribou herd (LRCH), another migratory herd of Labrador caribou, near the coast of Hudson Bay, increased from 270,000 individuals in 1991 to 628,000 in 2001. By 2011 the herd had decreased to 430,000. According to an international study on caribou populations, the George River and Leaf River herds and other herds that migrate from Nunavik, Quebec and insular Newfoundland, could be threatened with extinction by 2080.

==== Queen Charlotte Islands caribou ====
The Queen Charlotte Islands caribou (formerly R. t. dawsoni) from Graham Island, the largest of the Queen Charlotte Islands, is a distinct subspecies. It became extinct at the beginning of the 20th century. Recent DNA analysis from mitochondrial DNA taken from the remains of these caribou suggest that the animals from the Queen Charlotte Islands were genetically close to from the adjacent mainland caribou subspecies, Osborn's caribou, now recognized as of Beringian-Eurasian lineage.

== Greenland ==
Greenland reindeer, formerly recognized as a full species, are the most genetically divergent of all caribou and reindeer, with an average genetic distance (FST) of 44%. Unlike barren-ground caribou, they have a harem-defense mating system, migrate only short (< 60 km) distances if at all, and lack the rutting and post-calving aggregation behavior of barren-ground caribou. Genetic, behavioral and morphological differences from other caribou and reindeer are so great that a recent revision returned them to full species status.

===== West Greenland =====
Nine main populations of Greenland reindeer and caribou (Originally Cervus [Rangifer] grönlandicus Borowski, 1780) occupied western and southwestern Greenland (Ivittuut to Nuussuaq Peninsula) in 2020. The Kangerlussuaq-Sisimiut caribou herd, the largest, had a population of around 98,000 animals in 2007, decreasing to around 60,000 to 74,000 animals in 2018. The second largest, the Akia-Maniitsoq caribou herd, decreased from an estimated 46,000 in 2001 to about 24,000 in 2010, before it increased to about 49,000 in 2019. According to Cuyler, "one possible cause might be the topography, which prevents hunter access in the former while permitting access in the latter". Caribou populations in western Greenland are as follows:

- Nuussuaq Halvø: min. 1,164 (2002)
- Naternaq: 271 (1995)
- Kangerlussuaq-Sisimiut: min. 60,469 (73,895) (2018)
- Akia-Maniitsoq: 48,941 (2019)
- Ameralik: 19,503 (2019)
- Qeqertarsuatsiaat: 4,800 (2012)
- Qassit: min. 196 (2000)
- Neria: min. 332 (1,600) (2000)
- Ivittuut: N/A

Western Greenland holds an estimated 135,000 to 150,000 caribou, approximately 98% of Greenland’s total caribou population.

===== Northwest Greenland =====
Two main populations of Greenland reindeer and caribou occupied northwestern Greenland around Qaanaaq in 2020, which include the Inglefield Land & Prudhoe Land and Olrik Fjord management regions. The Inglefield Land population is considered endemic, the Prudhoe Land population a possible mix of endemic caribou and introduced reindeer, and the Olrik Fjord population introduced, stemming from an introduction of 9 semi-domesticated reindeer in 1965.

Unlike western and southwestern Greenland, the Greenland wolf is present in the area, although there have not been reports of wolves hunting caribou in northwestern Greenland. Wolves formed a stable presence in the region in the late 2010s. In 2024, a pack of 11 wolves was observed in Inglefield Land, the highest in Greenland since 1926.

The caribou population in northwestern Greenland used to be large in size and continuous in range, particularly around Olrik Fjord and western Inglefield Land and had its highest abundance before 1860. The introduction of the bow and arrow to the Inughuit by emigrants from Baffin Island in 1864 caused the caribou population across northwestern Greenland to decline. Firearms were introduced by Robert Peary in the 1890s, along with a major rain-on-snow event in the winter of 1901-02 causing catastrophic starvation in the Wolstenholme Fjord - Inglefield Fjord region, further worsening the decline of caribou in the region and leading to successful hunts in the central part of the region to cease in 1912. Around 1916, the Wolstenholme Fjord population was extirpated, around 1940 the Olrik Fjord - Prudhoe Land population was extirpated, and the Inglefield Land population was nearly extirpated in the late 1970s but rebounded in the 1990s and by 2005 recolonized Prudhoe Land, beginning in the early 2000s. Since April 2005, the Greenland Home Rule government decided that the Olrik Fjord population should be exterminated, although attempts, including no bag limits for hunters on the herd, have been unsuccessful. Northwestern Greenland in total only has about an estimated 2,400 caribou (see below), which is approximately 2% of Greenland’s total caribou population. Since 1900, the range of caribou in the region has halved, with the entire southern half’s native caribou becoming extirpated.

- Inglefield Land: 2,260 (1999)
- Prudhoe Land: min. 123 (2005)
- Olrik Fjord: min. 38 (2001)

===== East Greenland =====
In East Greenland, caribou were historically present but the Arctic reindeer (East Greenland caribou) (Rangifer tarandus eogroenlandicus) subspecies that lived in Northeast Greenland went extinct around 1900. In Southeast Greenland, caribou were extirpated around the year 1100.

== Norway ==
The last remaining wild tundra reindeer in Europe are found in portions of southern Norway. In southern Norway in the mountain ranges, there are about 30,000–35,000 reindeer with 23 different populations. The largest herd, with about 10,000 individuals, is at Hardangervidda. By 2013 the greatest challenges to management were "loss of habitat and migration corridors to piecemeal infrastructure development and abandonment of reindeer habitat as a result of human activities and disturbance".

Norway is now preparing to apply for nomination as a World Heritage Site for areas with traces and traditions of reindeer hunting in Dovrefjell-Sunndalsfjella National Park, Reinheimen National Park and Rondane National Park in Central Sør-Norge (Southern Norway). There is in these parts of Norway an unbroken tradition of reindeer hunting from the post-glacial Stone Age until today.

On 29 August 2016, the Norwegian Environment Agency announced the death of 323 reindeer by the effects of a lightning strike in Hardangervidda.

On 3 December 2018 a hiker in Northern Norway reported a sighting, and posted photos, of a rare white reindeer calf.

=== Svalbard reindeer ===
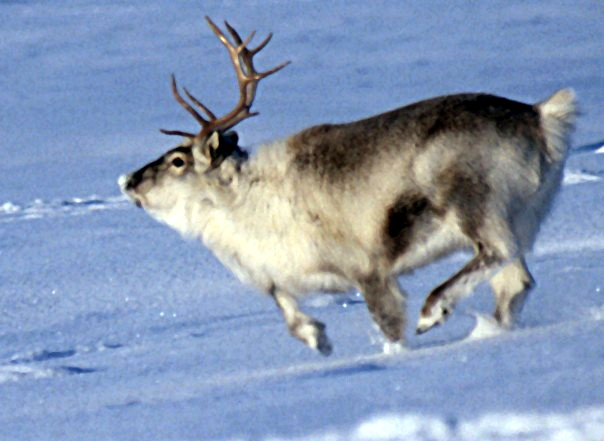
Characteristically small and relatively short-legged reindeer from Svalbard

The Svalbard reindeer (R. tarandus platyrhynchus) from Svalbard Island is very small compared to other subspecies (a phenomenon known as insular dwarfism) and is the smallest of all the subspecies, with females having a length of approximately 150 cm (59 in), and a weight around 53 kg (117 lb) in the spring and 70 kg (150 lb) in the autumn. Males are approximately 160 cm (63 in) long, and weigh around 65 kg (143 lb) in the spring and 90 kg (200 lb) in the autumn. The reindeer from Svalbard are also relatively short-legged and may have a shoulder height of as little as 80 cm (31 in), thereby following Allen's rule.

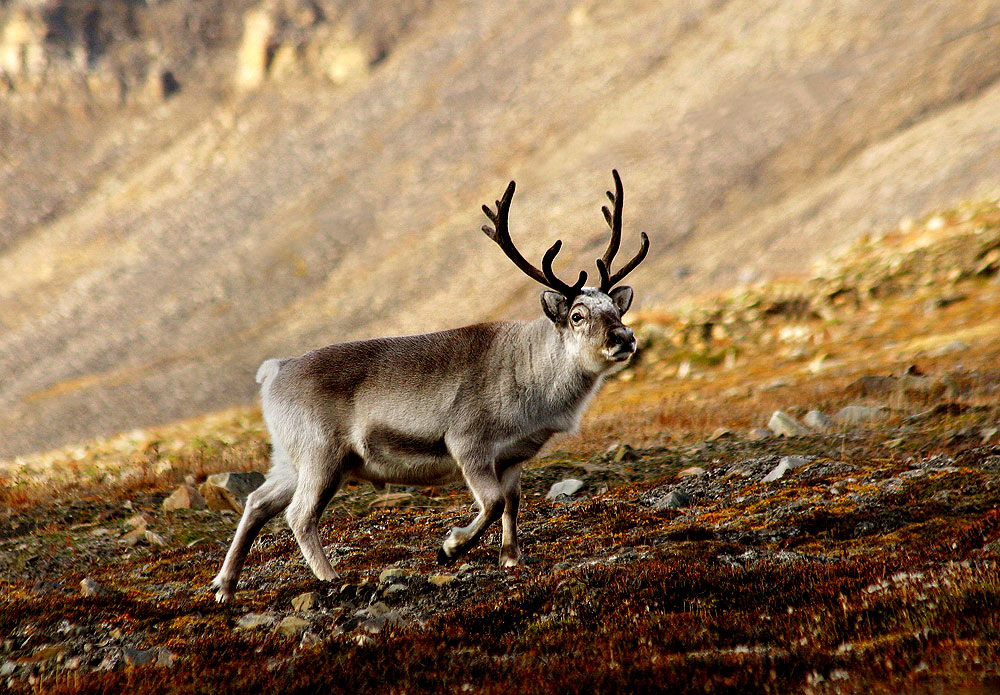
Svalbard reindeer (R. t. platyrhynchus)

The Svalbard reindeer seems to have evolved from large European reindeer, and is special in several ways: it has peculiarities in its metabolism, and its skeleton shows a remarkable relative shortening of the legs, thus parallelling many extinct insular deer species.

== Sweden ==
Reindeer inhabit mostly northern parts of Sweden and the central Swedish province of Dalarna. In northern Sweden and parts of Dalarna, reindeer herding activity is generally part of the lifestyle of the indigenous Sámi people.

== Finland ==
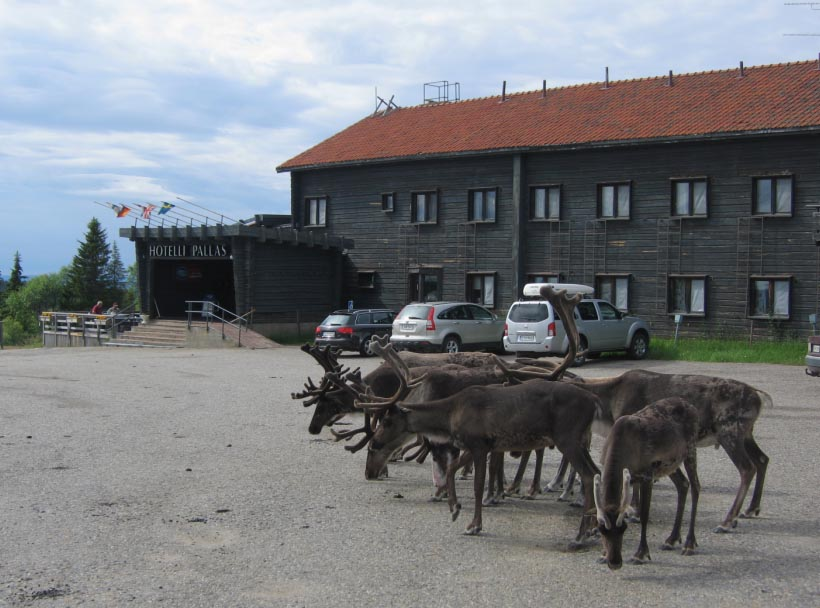
Reindeers in front of Hotel Pallas in Muonio, Finland

The Finnish forest reindeer (R. t. fennicus), is found in the wild in only two areas of the Fennoscandia peninsula of Northern Europe, in Finnish/Russian Karelia and a small population in central south Finland. The Karelia population reaches far into Russia, and genetic research shows that the Altai-Sayan forest reindeer, R. t. valentinae, clusters together with Finnish forest reindeer and apart from tundra reindeer, R. t. sibiricus. By 2007 reindeer experts were concerned about the collapse of the wild Finnish forest reindeer in the eastern province of Kainuu. During the peak year of 2001, the Finnish forest reindeer population in Kainuu was established at 1,700. In a March 2007 helicopter count, only 960 individuals were detected.

== Iceland ==
East Iceland has a small herd of about 2,500–3,000 animals. Reindeer were introduced to Iceland in the late 1700s. The Icelandic reindeer population in July 2013 was estimated at approximately 6,000. With a hunting quota of 1,229 animals, the winter 2013–2014 population is expected to be around 4,800 reindeer.

== United Kingdom ==
Semi-domesticated reindeer of domestic stock were brought to Scotland in 1952. In 2017, there were about 150 left to graze across 4,000 hectares (10,000 acres) of land in the Cairngorms National Park, where the climate is classed as tundra.

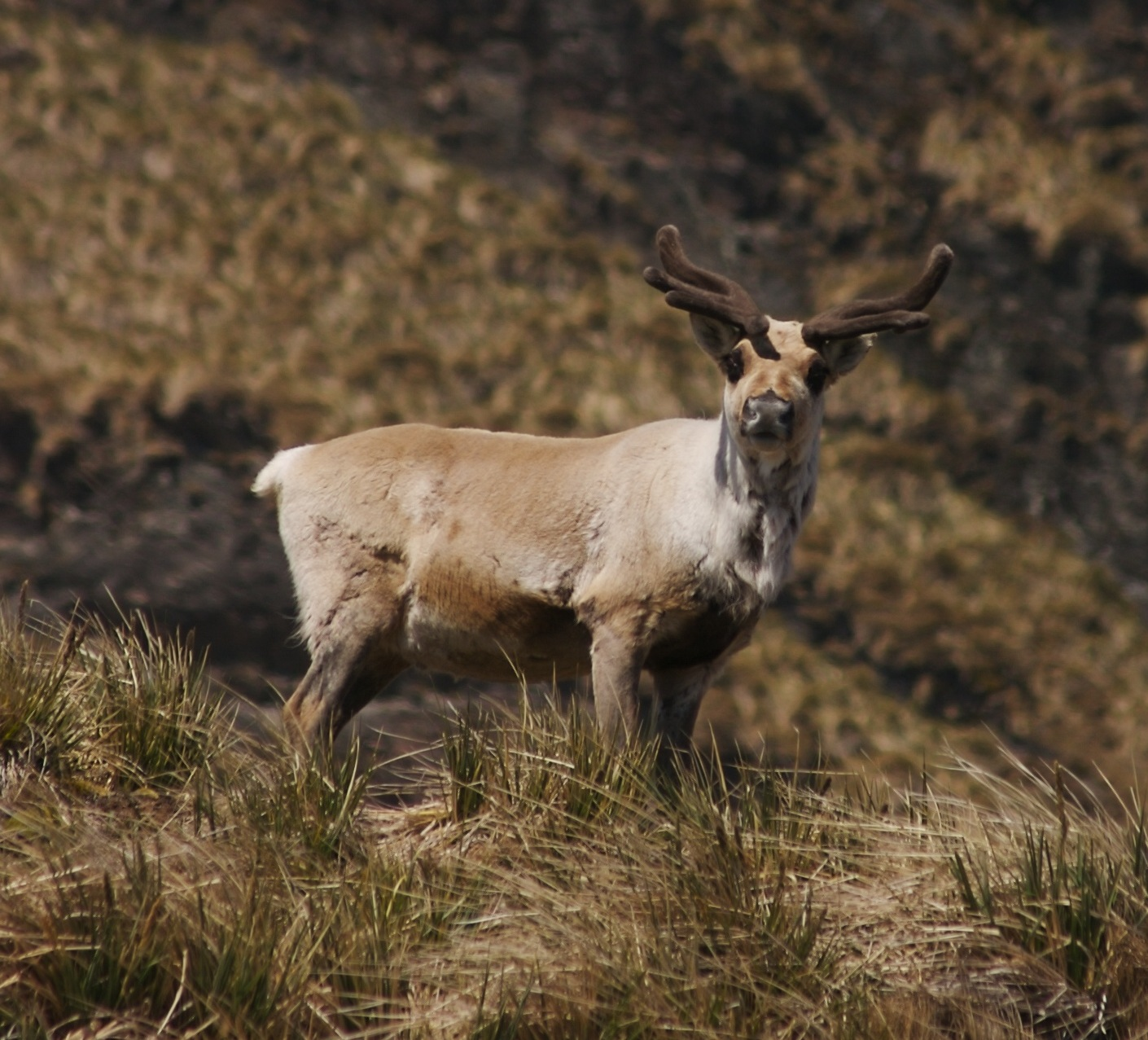
Southernmost reindeer: South Georgian reindeer with velvet-covered antlers

A few reindeer from Norway were introduced to the South Atlantic island of South Georgia in the beginning of the 20th century. The South Georgian reindeer totaled some estimated 2,600 animals in two distinct herds separated by glaciers. Although both the flag and the coat of arms of the territory contain an image of a reindeer, a decision was taken in 2011 to completely eradicate the animals from the island because of the environmental damage they cause, which was done so with a team of Norwegian Sami hunters from 2013 to 2017, which revealed the true count to be around 6,750.

== French overseas territory experiment ==
Around 4,000 reindeer are descendants to those who have been introduced into the French sub-Antarctic archipelago of the Kerguelen Islands.
