= Reindeer in South Georgia =

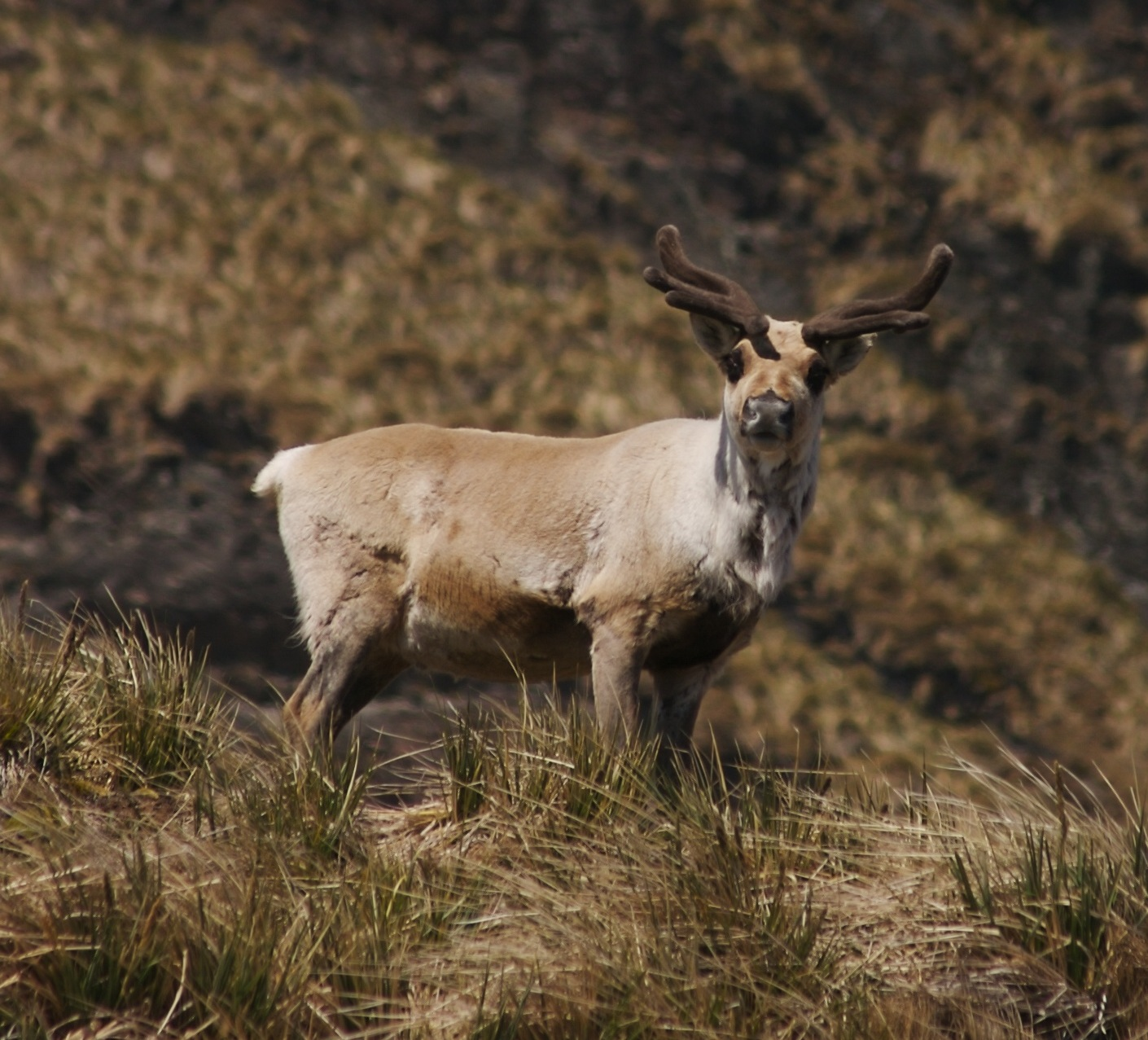
Individual with velvet-covered antlers from the southern herd.

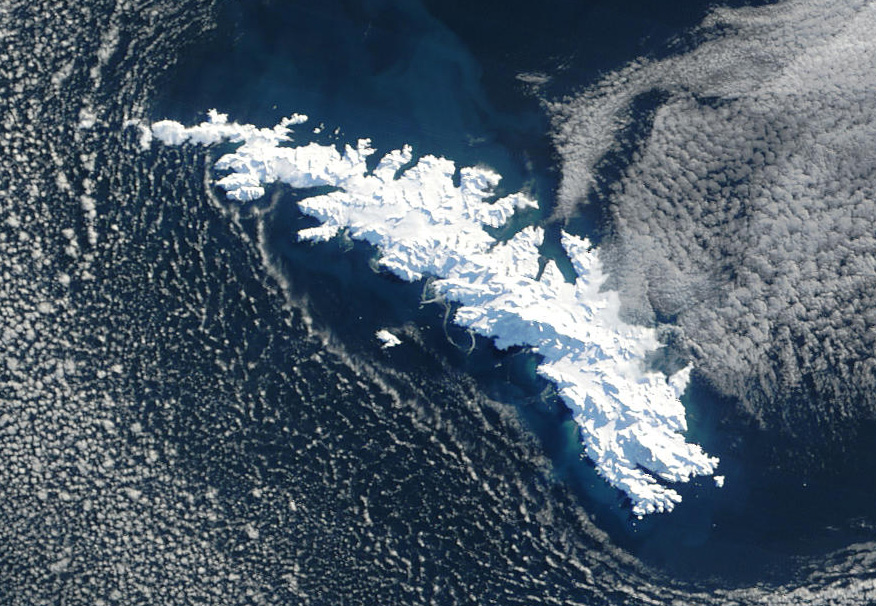
Satellite view of the extensively glaciated island of South Georgia

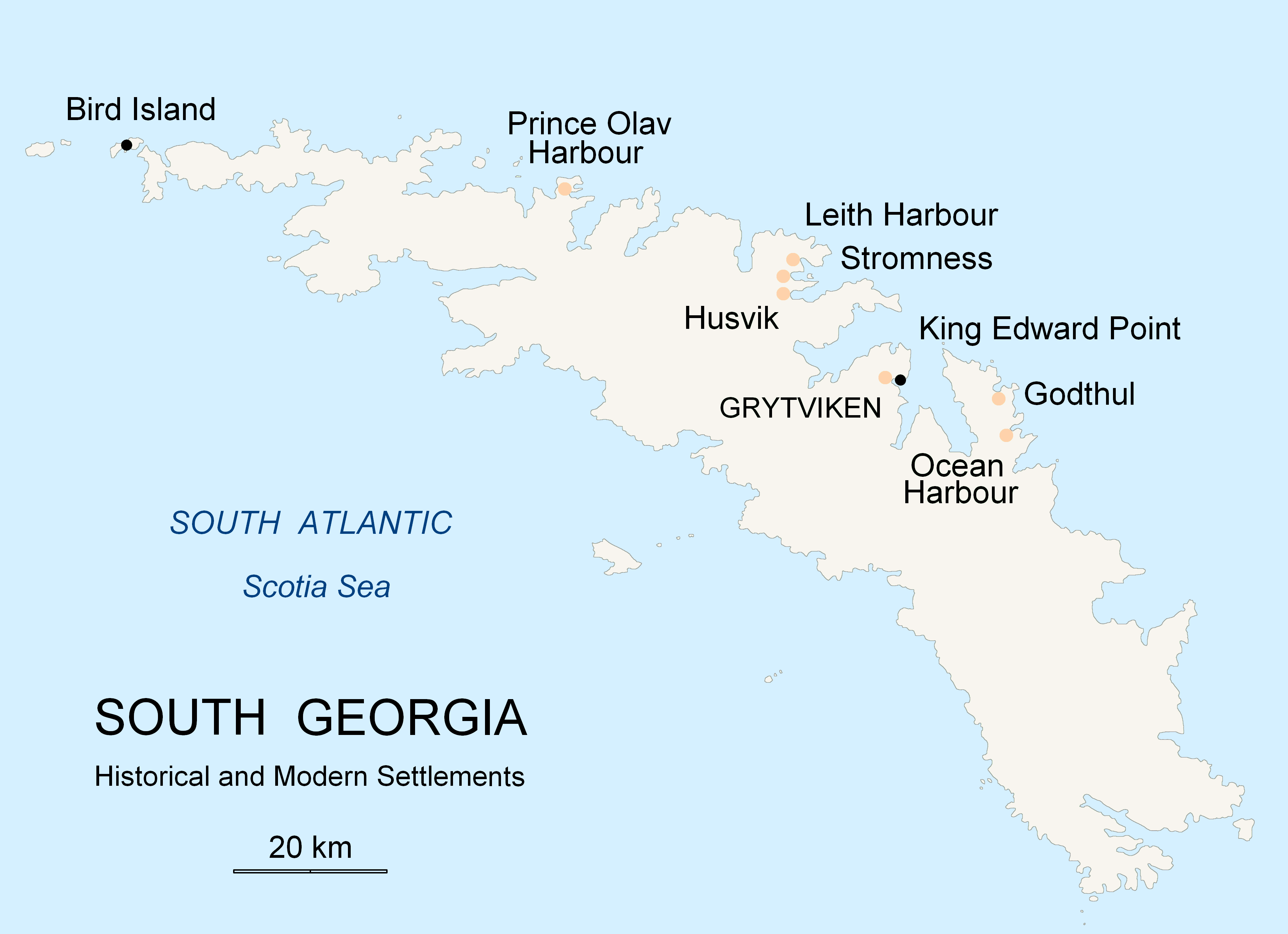
Map showing Leith Harbour and Ocean Harbour where reindeer were released

Reindeer in South Georgia are an example of an animal which has been introduced outside its native range. The reindeer, a species of deer adapted to arctic and subarctic climates, was introduced to the subantarctic island of South Georgia by Norwegian whalers in the early 20th century.

Initially, the reindeer were intended to provide recreational hunting as well as fresh meat for the numerous people working in the whaling industry on the island at the time. Following the end of the whaling industry in the 1960s, and in the absence of a permanent human population, the reindeer divided into two geographically separated wild herds, increasing in number to the point of causing envrionmental damage. As the whaling industry came to an end in the 1960s, and in the absence of a permanently resident human population, the reindeer population, in two geographically separated wild herds, increasing to the point where their presence was causing environmental damage. This led to a decision to eradicate them, a program carried out between 2013 and 2015.

== History ==
=== Introduction ===
In the early 20th century South Georgia became the world's largest whaling centre, with shore bases established at Grytviken (operating 1904–1964), Leith Harbour (1909–1965), Ocean Harbour (1909–1920), Husvik (1910–1960), Stromness (1912–1961) and Prince Olav Harbour (1917–1934). The opportunity to hunt and harvest fresh meat benefited those engaged in the whaling industry.

The first introduction was made by the brothers C.A. and L.E. Larsen in November 1911. Three males and seven females from Hemsedal in southern Norway were released at Ocean Harbour (then the site of an active whaling station) on the Barff Peninsula, on the northern coast of South Georgia. These formed the basis of what came to be called the Barff herd which, by 1958, had increased to 3000 animals. A 1976 population estimate of 1900 head indicated subsequent decrease, though with some range expansion to Royal Bay.

A second introduction was made in 1912 by the Christian Salvesen Company. Two male and three female reindeer were left at Leith Harbour in Stromness Bay, also on the north coast of the island. By 1918 they had increased to 20 animals, but the entire herd was killed by an avalanche that year.

The third introduction took place in 1925; three males and four females were released at Husvik Harbour in Stromness Bay. These became the nucleus of what became known as the Busen herd, the numbers of which increased slowly to 40 in 1953 before climbing rapidly to about 800 head by the early 1990s. The source of the animals was the same as that of the Barff herd.

=== Expansion ===
The Barff herd was relatively isolated from human access and increased rapidly in size before it outgrew its resources and declined in numbers. The Busen herd, however, was much more accessible to the human population of South Georgia; its size was kept relatively low by regular hunting until whale processing declined and came to an end.

Since the whaling industry ended in the 1960s, and those employed by it departed, South Georgia has been largely depopulated except for a small military presence, visiting scientists and occasional tourists from cruise ships or private yachts. Little hunting or any other human control of the reindeer has occurred. By 2010 the two herds, separated by glaciers terminating in the ocean and isolated from other ice and snow free areas, comprised some 2600 animals occupying 318 km^{2}, one third of the total vegetated area, and thus potential grazing habitat, of the island.

An accurate count during the eradication of 2013-15 showed that earlier estimates of numbers were very low - nearly 7,000 were killed.

=== Translocation ===
In 1971 the Royal Navy ship HMS Endurance collected eight deer from Corral Bay on the Barff peninsula with the intention of taking them to Navarino Island in Tierra del Fuego, Chile. All survived except one that died on Christmas Day in Port Stanley. The remainder were delivered to Chile on New Year's Eve.

In order to preserve the genetic resources of the South Georgia herds, and in order to help diversify agriculture in the Falkland Islands, 59 South Georgian reindeer calves (26 males and 33 females) were translocated from the Busen herd to the Falklands in 2001 by the Falkland Island Government in order to establish a commercial herd there. Their first offspring were produced in 2003.

Falkland Island resident Jerome Poncet collected some young deer during two expeditions in 2002 and 2003, using his yacht Golden Fleece, which had a shelter built on the stern deck. He successfully introduced 31 young deer to Beaver Island in the Falkland Islands, where they still flourish.

=== Eradication ===
Despite eradication reindeer are still present on the coat of arms and flag

Discussions about eradicating the herd were had as early as the 1970s. In 1974, D. C. Lindsay published an opinion whereby he suggested setting up a cannery on the island and destroying the herd for meat. He cited damage to the native lichens and tussock grasses as a reason to cull.

Because of the environmental damage caused by the reindeer, and the danger that glacial retreat would allow them to extend their range to other areas of the island, their permanent eradication was proposed, with the announcement of intention made on 19 February 2011.

In January and February 2013, the Busen herd, in the Stromness Bay Area between Fortuna Bay and Jason Point, 2,090 reindeer were eradicated by a combination of herding, followed by slaughter and meat recovery, and shooting where herding was impractical. In this way, 7,500 kg of meat products was recovered. In addition, 1,555 reindeer of the Barff herd were shot.

In January 2014 a further 3,140 animals were shot in the Barff peninsula area between Barff Point and Royal Bay. No meat could be recovered to a saleable standard, though some was butchered for local consumption.

Over the following few years small groups of up to 15 animals were found and shot by government marksmen, with the last two being found on Jason point in late 2017, during the rodent eradication project's final, monitoring, phase.

== Biology ==
Rutting peaked between the 20th and 30 March, with calves being born in November. Males became sexually mature at 4–8 months old and females could first conceive at 16–17 months. The mean generation length was 4.2 years, with males having an average 7-8 year, and females an 11-12 year, lifespan, with annual mortality of 30-40%. The main limiting factor in the population was the availability of winter forage, as well as starvation; a significant cause of mortality was falls from cliffs while trying to access ungrazed areas.

== Environmental impact ==
The population density of the reindeer in South Georgia was generally much higher than in their native range. In the Svalbard archipelago in the Arctic, reindeer density is about 5/km^{2}, while 7/km^{2} is considered a safe stocking rate for winter range. In South Georgia, although densities vary, values ranging from 40/km^{2} to 85/km^{2} were recorded.

The areas occupied by reindeer on South Georgia were the most vegetated and biologically diverse on the island. The impact of the animals was severe, resulting in overgrazing of the native tussac grass and greater burnet, soil erosion, loss of plant community biodiversity and the spread of invasive weeds, such as the introduced grass Poa annua which is better able to sustain grazing than the native flora.

== Other southern introductions ==
Few introductions of reindeer to places in the Southern Hemisphere have been carried out. An attempted introduction in the late 1940s to southern Argentina failed when the animals were subsequently killed. An attempt to translocate animals from South Georgia to Isla Navarino, Chile, failed when seven of the eight animals being transported died on the sea voyage. Apart from South Georgia, the only other successful introduction was in 1954 to the subantarctic Kerguelen Islands, a French territory in the southern Indian Ocean, with ten reindeer from Swedish Lapland, which had increased by the 1970s to a population of about 2,000.
