= Ocean Harbour =

Coordinates: 54°20′S 36°16′W

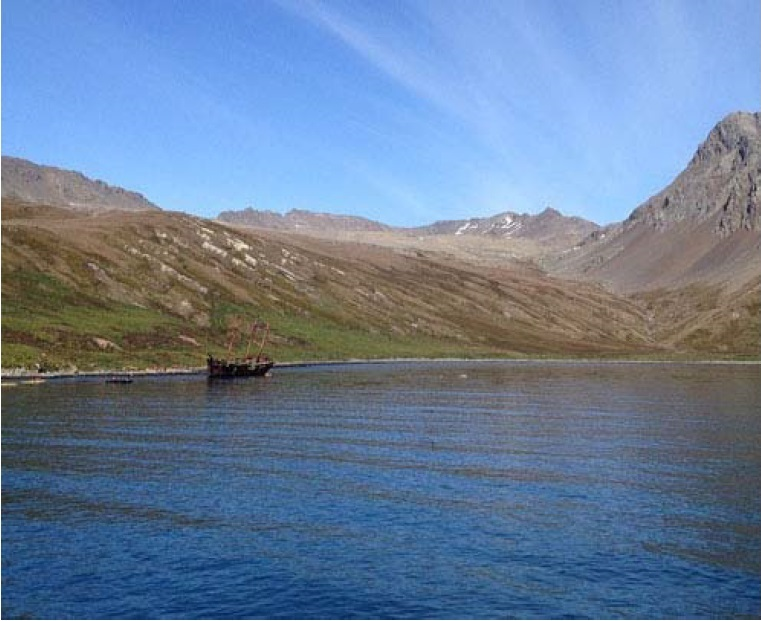

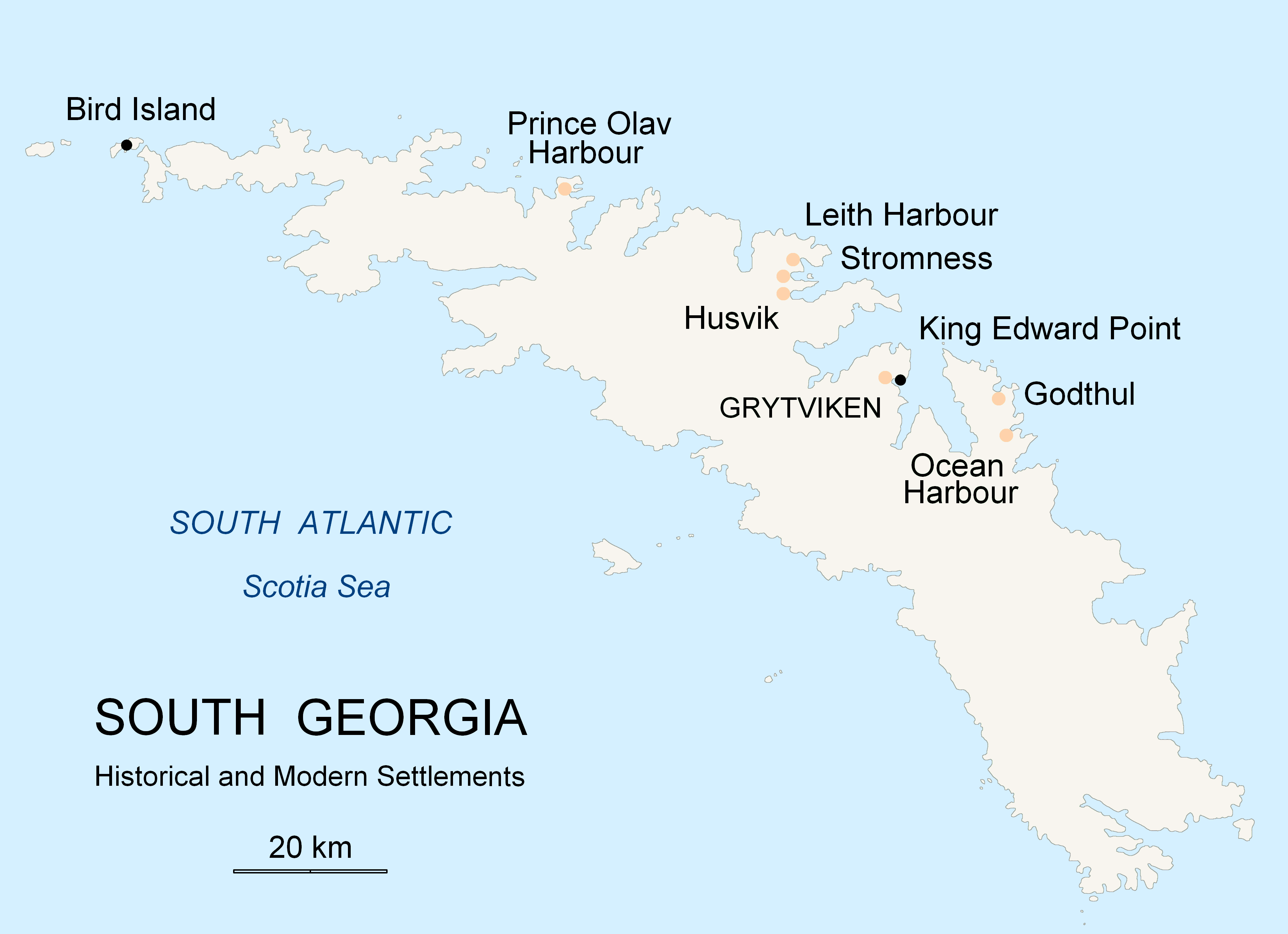
Historical and modern settlements of South Georgia Island, showing Ocean Harbour

Ocean Harbour (Spanish: Puerto Nueva Fortuna) is a deeply indented bay on Barff Peninsula on the north coast of South Georgia which is entered 1.5 miles (2.4 km) west-northwest of Tijuca point. It was a whaling station between 1909 and 1920. At one point, South Georgia was the whaling capital of the world.

The names New Fortune Bay and Neufortuna Bay, probably for the whaling catcher Fortuna (owned by the Norwegian-Argentine whaling company Pesca), were used for this site in 1922 by Filchner, following the German Antarctic Expedition, 1911–12. In 1951–52 the island was surveyed by the South Georgia Survey who reported the site was known to whalers and sealers as Ocean Harbour, a name derived from the Ocean Whaling Co. which at one time had a station there. The name Ocean Harbour is approved for this feature on the basis of local usage, and also to avoid confusion of the name New Fortuna Bay with Fortuna Bay, only 22 miles (35 km) to the northwest.

== History ==
Old sealing trypots can still be seen here, and there is also the wreck of the Bayard here, a 1,300 tonne, 67 m (220 ft) long, iron-hulled boat, built in 1864. She was moored at the coaling station in 1911 when a gale blew her loose across the bay. Ocean Harbour was the site of the first introduction of reindeer to South Georgia by Pesca's whaling station manager Carl Anton Larsen and his brother in November 1911.

Ocean Harbour has a small cemetery with eight graves including the oldest known grave on the island – that of Frank Cabrial (1820) of the sealer Francis Allen. The marker is gone, though some of the others are still marked.
