= Szielasko Ice Cap =

Ice cap in South Georgia

Szielasko Ice Cap (54°19′S 36°18′W) is an ice cap 2 miles (3.2 km) long, occupying the highland close south of Godthul Bay on the north side of South Georgia. Surveyed by the SGS in the period 1951–57. Named by the United Kingdom Antarctic Place-Names Committee (UK-APC) for August E.A. Szielasko, medical officer on the Fridtjof Nansen which was wrecked off South Georgia in 1906. He published geographical and ornithological notes about the island.
