= Bayard (ship) =

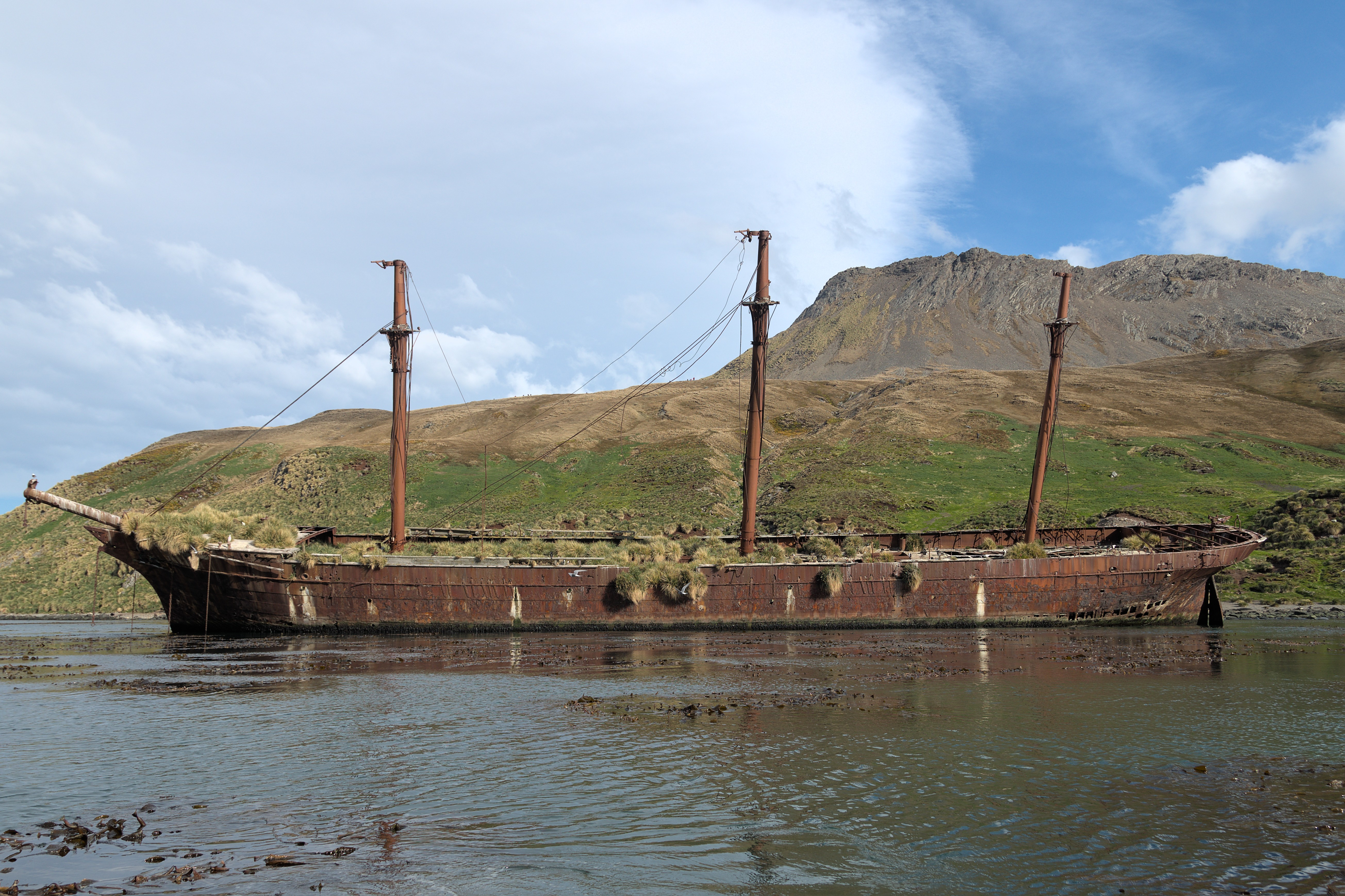
- The wreck of Bayard in Ocean Harbour, 2016

History

United Kingdom
- Owner: Hall Line
- Builder: T. Vernon and Son, Liverpool
- Launched: 1864
- Acquired: Sun Shipping Company, 1868; Foley and Company, 1881
- Fate: Ran aground 6 June 1911

General characteristics
- Tonnage: 1,028
- Length: 67 m (220 ft)

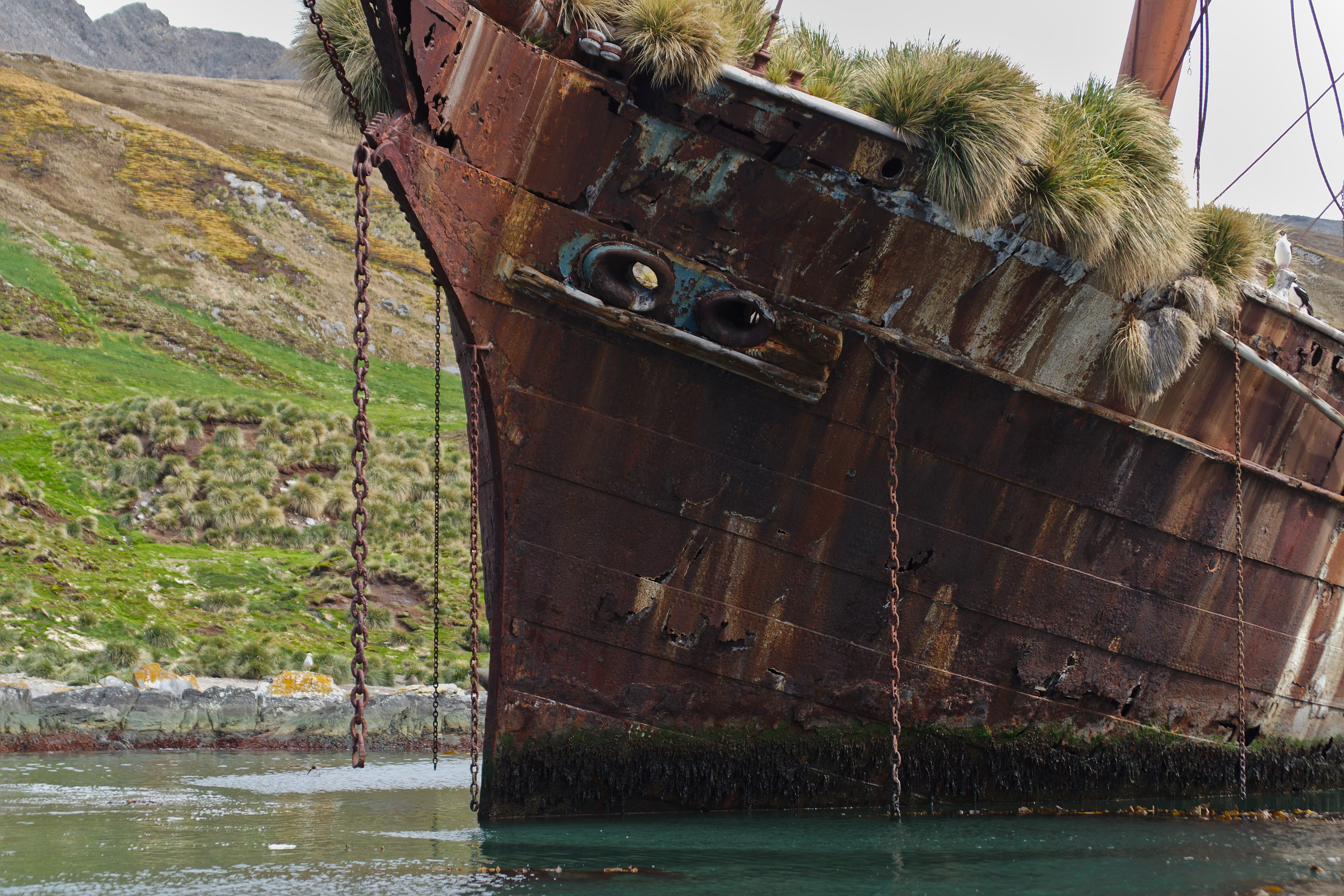
Bayard's prow

Bayard was a 67-metre (220 ft) long, 1,028 ton, iron-hulled, full-rigged sailing ship built by T. Vernon and Son, Liverpool for the Hall Line in 1864. In 1868 she was transferred to Sun Shipping Company and in 1881 sold to Foley and Company.

On 20 August 1883 she arrived in Suva, Fiji carrying 494 Indian indentured labourers from Calcutta. She had previously carried indentured labourers to the West Indies.

On 6 May 1885, Bayard hit an iceberg, 55 miles (89 km) South of Cape Race while on a voyage from Marseille to Saint Pierre. The ship lost her stern, bowsprit, jib-boom, foremast, topgallantmast and yard, but reached her destination on 23 May, leaking badly.

She was later used as a coaling ship for the whaling station in South Georgia. Bayard lost her mooring at the coaling pier in Ocean Harbour during a severe gale on 6 June 1911 and ran aground on the rocks on the southern side of the bay, where the wreck still remains, as a breeding site for blue-eyed shags.

== See also ==
- Indian indenture system
- Indian indenture ships to Fiji
- Indians in Fiji
