= J. Keith Fraser =

Canadian physical geographer

John Keith Fraser
- Born: February 18, 1922 (age 104); Ottawa, Ontario
- Education: Clark University
- Known for: President of the Canadian Association of Geographers; Executive secretary, publisher and general manager of the Royal Canadian Geographical Society
- Awards: Award for Service to the Profession of Geography
- Scientific career
- Fields: Physical geographer
- Workplaces: Geographical Branch, Department of Mines and Technical Surveys, Ottawa

John Keith Fraser (born February 18, 1922) is a Canadian physical geographer. He served as president of the Canadian Association of Geographers, as well as the executive secretary, publisher and general manager of the Royal Canadian Geographical Society.

== Early life and education ==
Fraser was born in Ottawa, Ontario on February 18, 1922. Fraser is a veteran of World War II, serving in the Royal Canadian Air Force/Royal Air Force.

In 1955, he received a M.A. degree from the University of Toronto. He received his Ph.D. in 1964 from Clark University; his dissertation was entitled The physiography of Boothia Peninsula, Northwest territories a study in terrain analysis and air photo interpretation of an Arctic area.

== Career ==
After the war, Fraser had a career as a Canadian government employee with the Geographical Branch, Department of Mines and Technical Surveys, Ottawa, publishing articles after many of his field assignments.

One of his first assignments, in the late 1940s, was as an observer on tugs in the Mackenzie River, and on Hudson's Bay Company vessels in the western Arctic Ocean.

In 1951, he assisted geomorphologist J. Ross Mackay in investigating Amundsen Gulf's Darnley Bay area. After reviewing recent aerial photographs and old maps, Fraser determined that the Rivière La Roncière-le Noury, charted by French Missionary Oblate Émile Petitot in 1875 but considered nonexistent decades later by explorer Vilhjalmur Stefansson, did exist. Though there were errors in the placement of the Roncière's mouth at Franklin Bay, the Roncière was the same river as the partially mapped Hornaday River by Andrew J. Stone in 1899.

The following year, he participated in the Canadian Ice Distribution Survey. In 1953, Fraser studied the central Arctic coast around the Boothia Isthmus. In 1954, he was the department's representative to the Aklavik Relocation Survey team in the Mackenzie Delta, and in 1955, he studied the southeastern coastline of Victoria Island. 1956 found him studying the south coast of King William Island and Sherman Inlet.

== Affiliations ==
Fraser became a Fellow and director of the Royal Canadian Geographical Society in 1959. In 1982, he was appointed executive secretary, publisher and general manager. A new publisher arrived in 1988, but Fraser continued in his other two roles until 1990. In that same year, the Society established the Fraser Lectureship in Northern Studies program in his honor.

He became a Fellow of the Arctic Institute of North America in 1960.

In 1975, Fraser received the Award for Service to the Profession of Geography from the Canadian Association of Geographers. Six years later, he served as president of the Association.

In 1992, Fraser was award the Camsell Medal by the Royal Canadian Geographical Society in honour of his service to the Society.

== Partial works ==
- (1952), Identification of Petitot's Riviere La Ronciere-le Noury
- (1959), Notes on the glaciation of King William Island and Adelaide Peninsula, N.W.T. OCLC 14036925
- (1966), The realistic approach to geographical names in Canada
- (1970), Place names of the Hudson Bay Region OCLC 6155814019
- (1972), Directory of Canadian geography OCLC 629993
- (1972), List of theses and dissertations on Canadian geography OCLC 251485540
