= Parry Peninsula =

Peninsula on north coast of Canada's Northwest Territories

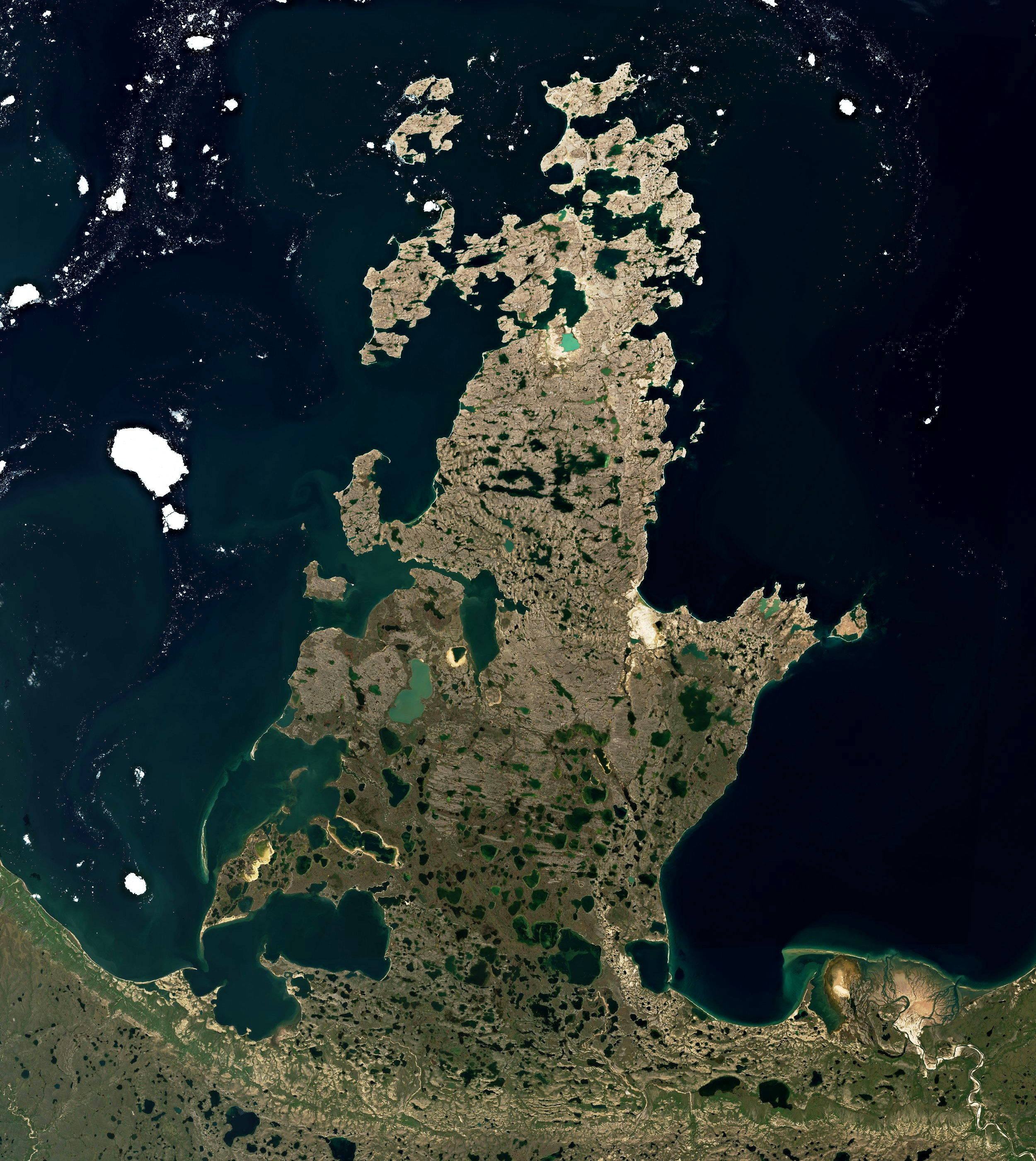
- Sentinel-2 image (2021) of the peninsula with Paulatuk and Hornaday River delta in the bottom right corner.

- Location within Northwest Territories

Geography
- Location: Northwest Territories, Canada
- Coordinates: 69.667°N 124.667°W
- Adjacent to: Arctic Ocean: Franklin Bay; Amundsen Gulf; Darnley Bay

Administration
- Canada

The Parry Peninsula on the north coast of Canada's Northwest Territories is bounded on the west by Franklin Bay, on the north by Amundsen Gulf, and on the east by Darnley Bay. The nearest settlement is Paulatuk. It is also home to the Cape Parry Migratory Bird Sanctuary on the northern extremity of the Parry Peninsula.

== History ==
It is named for the Arctic explorer William Edward Parry, as well as the similarly named Cape Parry at its northern tip. A Distant Early Warning Line site is also located on the northern tip of the peninsula, that switched operations in 1989 to the North Warning System.

== See also ==
- Cape Parry
- Paulatuk
- Distant Early Warning Line
