= Croker River =

River in Nunavut, Canada

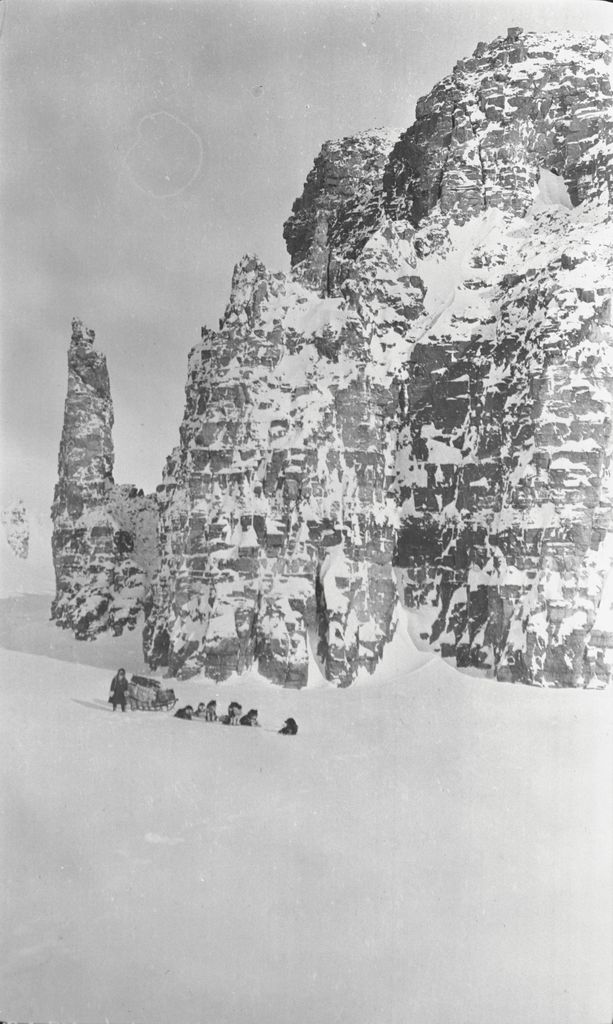
- Kenneth Gordon Chipman's sled and dogs at base of Sentinel rock on Croker River, 18 March 1916

- Crocker River (mouth) Croker River (Canada)

Location
- Country: Canada
- Territory: Nunavut

Physical characteristics
- Mouth
  - location: Amundsen Gulf
  - coordinates: 69°18′N 119°19′W
  - elevation: Sea level

The Croker River is a waterway above the Arctic Circle on the mainland of Northern Canada in the western Kitikmeot Region, Nunavut. It is the largest river between Darnley Bay (in the Northwest Territories) and Coronation Gulf that flows into Amundsen Gulf. The Croker averages 55 m (180 ft) in width.

It originates at Bluenose Lake then flows northward. It passes through a dolomite box canyon 8.0 km (5 mi) from the coast, before reaching a triangular shaped delta 24 km (15 mi) west of Clifton Point 69°13′N 118°38′W, and then entering Amundsen Gulf's Dolphin and Union Strait.

Croker River is named after John Wilson Croker, Secretary to the Admiralty.

Croker River (PIN 1BG) is a former Distant Early Warning Line and a current North Warning System site.

== See also ==
- List of rivers of Nunavut
