= Franklin Bay =

Bay in the Northwest Territories, Canada

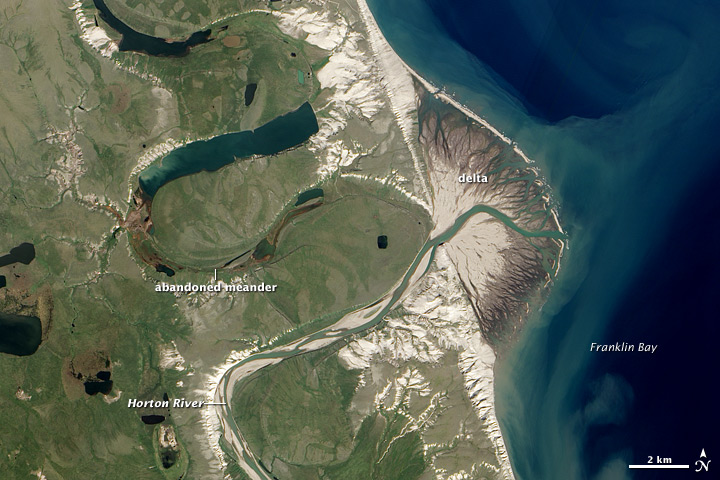
- Franklin Bay and the Horton River delta

- Location within Northwest Territories
- Location: Amundsen Gulf
- Coordinates: 69°45′01″N 126°00′09″W
- Ocean/sea sources: Arctic Ocean
- Basin countries: Canada
- Settlements: Uninhabited

Franklin Bay is a large inlet in the Northwest Territories, Canada. It is a southern arm of the Amundsen Gulf, southeastern Beaufort Sea. The bay measures 48 km (30 mi) long, and 40 km (25 mi) wide at its mouth. The Parry Peninsula is to the east, and its southern area is called Langton Bay.

Franklin Bay receives the Horton River. There are gales in the early winter months.

Franklin Bay was named in honour of Arctic explorer Sir John Franklin by John Richardson in 1826.

== History ==
Based on hearsay rather than exploration, Émile Petitot, a French Missionary Oblate and a notable Canadian northwest cartographer, ethnologist, and geographer charted the Hornaday River's mouth at Franklin Bay, instead of Darnley Bay in his flawed 1875 maps and account.

Langton Bay was the base of operations for the three-year expedition, 1909 to 1912, of Arctic explorers Vilhjalmur Stefansson and Rudolph Anderson
