= Horton River (Canada) =

River in Northwest Territories and Kitikmeot Region of Canada

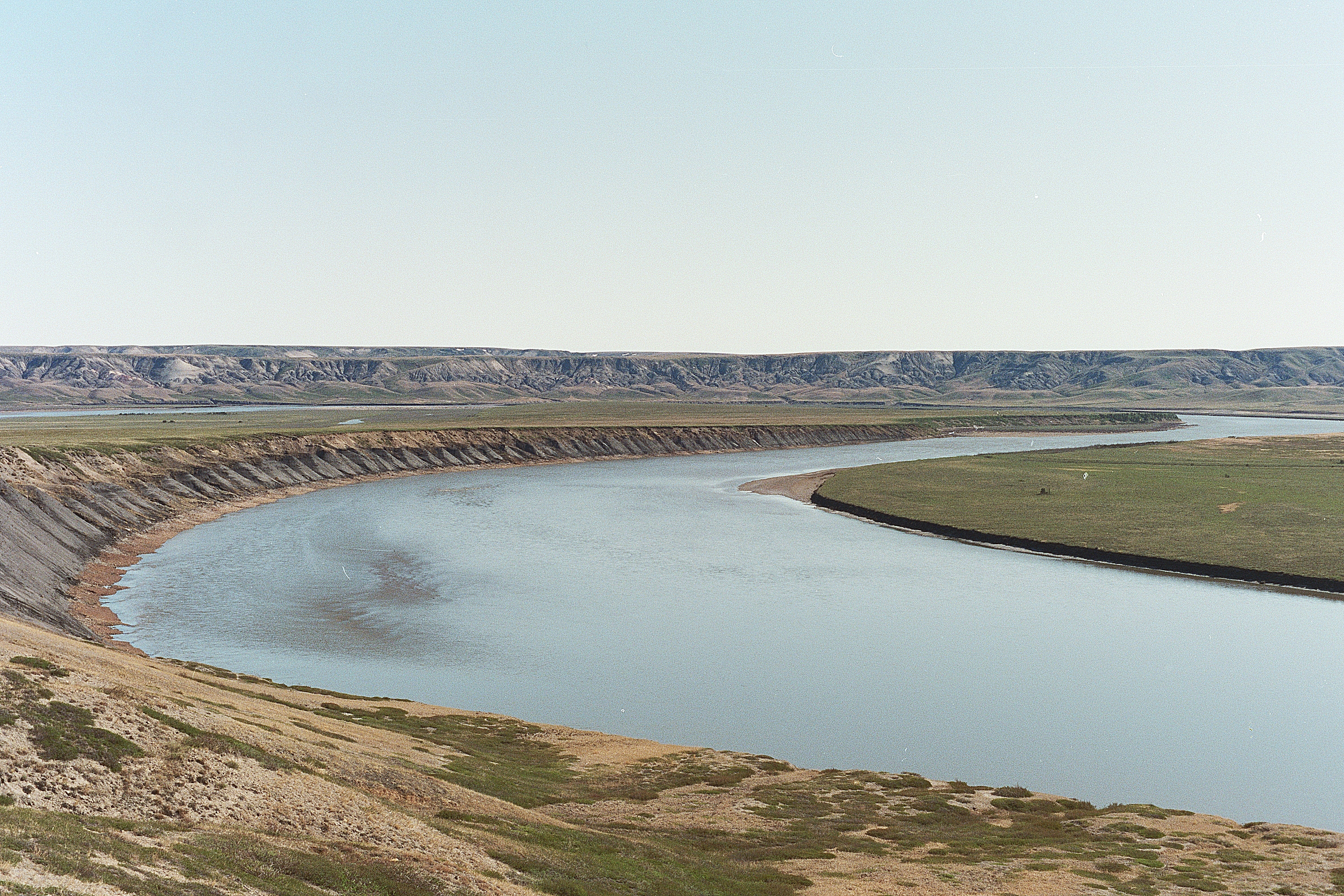
- Horton River

- Horton River mouth location

Location
- Country: Canada
- Territories: Northwest Territories, Nunavut
- Region: Inuvik, Sahtu, Kitikmeot

Physical characteristics
- Source: Lake
  - location: Kitikmeot Region, Nunavut
  - coordinates: 67°50′38″N 120°45′02″W
  - elevation: 584 m (1,916 ft)
- Mouth: Franklin Bay
  - location: Inuvik Region, Northwest Territories
  - coordinates: 69°56′01″N 126°48′10″W
  - elevation: 0 m (0 ft)
- Length: 618 km (384 mi)

Basin features
- River system: Arctic Ocean drainage basin

The Horton River is a river in Inuvik and Sahtu Regions, Northwest Territories and Kitikmeot Region, Nunavut, Canada. It is a tributary of the Beaufort Sea and hence part of the Arctic Ocean drainage basin. Only the first few kilometres from its source are within Nunavut.

== Course ==
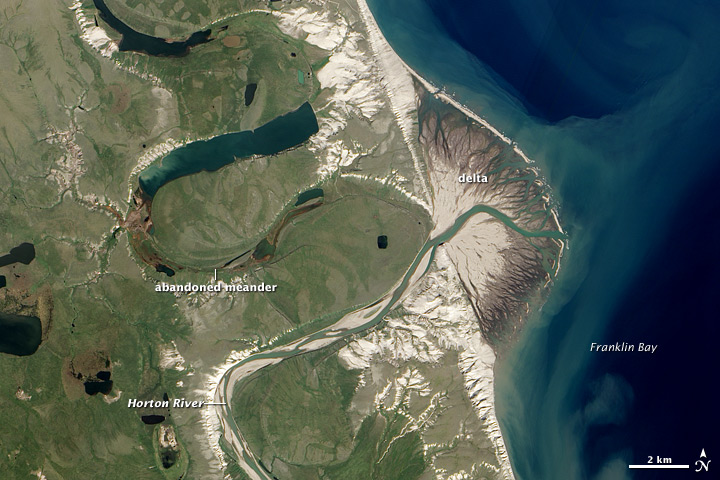
Horton River Delta in 2012

The river begins at a small lake about 100 kilometres (62 mi) north of the northeast Dease Arm of Great Bear Lake. It passes through the Smoking Hills and reaches its mouth on the east side of Cape Bathurst at Franklin Bay on the Amundsen Gulf of the Beaufort Sea, where it forms a small delta, about 125 kilometres (78 mi) northwest of the community of Paulatuk. The mouth had been 100 kilometres (62 mi) further north at Harrowby Bay on the west side of Cape Bathurst until about 1800 when a meander eroded through.

There is an airstrip just north of the mouth.

== DEW Line/NWS ==
Located about 8.5 km (5.3 mi) north northwest of the rivers mouth, at 70°00′59″N 126°56′35″W, lies the Horton River Short Range Radar Site (BAR-E), also known as Malloch Hills. Originally opened as a Distant Early Warning Line site it closed in 1963. The site was reopened in 1991 as a North Warning System short range radar.

== See also ==
- List of longest rivers of Canada
- List of rivers of the Northwest Territories
