= Hornaday River =

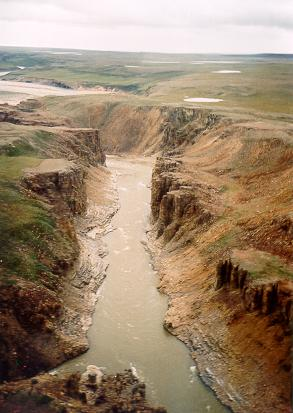

Location
- Country: Canada

Physical characteristics
- Source
  - location: South of Bluenose Lake (Takipaq), Nunavut
- Mouth
  - location: Amundsen Gulf, Northwest Territories
  - coordinates: 69°19′50″N 123°47′41″W
  - elevation: Sea level
- Length: 190 km (120 mi)
- Basin size: 13,120 km^{2} (5,070 sq mi)
- Discharge
  - average: 52.2 m^{3}/s (1,840 cu ft/s)

Hornaday River (variants: Big River, Homaday River, Hornaaa River; or Rivière La Roncière-le Noury) is a waterway located above the Arctic Circle on the mainland of Northern Canada.

The upper reach of a river first discovered in 1868 was named Rivière La Roncière-le Noury in honour of Admiral Baron Adalbert Camille Marie Clément de La Roncière-Le Noury, commander of the Mediterranean Squadron, and president of the Société de Géographie. The lower reach of a river discovered in 1899 was named Hornaday after American zoologist William Temple Hornaday. Decades later, the Roncière and the Hornaday were ascertained to be the same river.

== Course ==
The river originates (67°52′10″N 120°13′16″W) in the western Kitikmeot Region, Nunavut, 20 kilometres (12 mi) south of Bluenose Lake (Takipaq). It initially flows west-southwest, passing into the Northwest Territories along the southern edge of the Melville Hills within the Settlement Region of the Inuvialuit, just south of the Tuktut Nogait National Park boundary. It then flows northwest through Tuktut Nogait, its canyons and waterfalls making it one of the main features of the park. The river empties into Amundsen Gulf's Darnley Bay, 14 kilometres (9 mi) east of the Inuit hamlet of Paulatuk.

The Hornaday is approximately 190 kilometres (120 mi) long. Its main tributary is the Little Hornaday River northwest of the park. First Creek, Second Creek, Aklak Creek, George Creek, and Rummy Creek drain the Hornaday. Rummy Lake (69°07′31″N 123°30′08″W), Seven Islands Lake (69°17′02″N 123°00′16″W), and Hornaday Lake are part of the river's system. Hornaday River runs parallel with the Horton River to its west, and the Brock River to its east.

Located at an elevation of 274 metres (899 ft) above sea level, La Roncière Falls (69°08′16″N 122°52′37″W) is a 23-metre (75 ft) waterfall on the Hornaday, south of the main tributary. Its name was adopted by the Geographical Names Board of Canada in June 1952.

== Natural history ==
The area is part of the Arctic, Interior and Hudson Platforms. Deposit characteristics are coal seam.

The river's drainage basin includes the area between Great Bear Lake and the Arctic Ocean. Its middle course supports a wide channel for 65 kilometres (40 mi). The river's stretches include a broad bedrock valley, bedrock canyons, and a delta into the Arctic Ocean. Its tundra has a permafrost layer 2 metres (6 ft 7 in) below the surface which minimizes groundwater flow and storage, forcing rainstorm flow directly into the river.

Flora along the river is characterized by typical tundra vegetation such as sedge and lupine meadows, and some willow patches along the lower Hornaday. While a dense cover of spruce is found along the nearby Horton River, there are no spruce along the Hornaday.

Arctic charr, plentiful, are monitored by the Paulatuk community. Commercial fishing occurred between 1968 through 1986, sports fishing occurred in 1977 and 1978, while currently, the Hornaday is only a food fishery. Other fish species with the river include Arctic cisco, Arctic grayling, broad whitefish, burbot, longnose sucker, and nine-spined stickleback. Capelin are an abundant food source for the fish species.

The bluenose barren-ground caribou herd's calving grounds are west of the Hornaday River, south to the Little Hornaday River.

== History ==
=== Mapping controversy ===
The Rivière La Roncière-le Noury was discovered in 1868 by Émile Petitot, a French Missionary Oblate and a notable Canadian northwest cartographer, ethnologist, and geographer. He traveled most of the course of the river, mapping it in 1875. He admitted that he did not explore its lower reaches because of heavy fogs. In error, he charted its mouth to be in Franklin Bay instead of Darnley Bay. Petitot made the mistake based on hearsay, possibly from the Dene (Hare Indians) that traveled with him. However, in the same year, his accounts and maps were published in Paris, where he was awarded a silver medal by the Société de Géographie.

Because the river's mouth was mapped incorrectly, later explorers believed the Roncière did not exist.

In 1899, naturalist Andrew J. Stone of the American Museum of Natural History investigated the shores of Franklin Bay and Darnley Bay, discovering the mouth of a large river entering Darnley Bay, but he did not travel up the river. Stone named it Hornaday River in honour of William T. Hornaday, director of the New York Zoological Society.

Between 1909 and 1912, Arctic explorers Vilhjalmur Stefansson and Rudolph Anderson explored Franklin and Darnley Bays. In the 1913 The Stefánsson-Anderson Arctic expedition of the American museum : preliminary ethnological report, Stefansson concluded that "...River la Ronciere is represented to be on the chart, and that the River la Ronciere is in fact non-existent". Stefansson did not mention the river Stone found in 1899.

In 1915, the Canadian Arctic Expedition of 1913-18 finally delineated the southern shore of Darnley Bay, including the mouth of the Hornaday, but again, the expedition did not travel up the Hornaday. The subsequent map still showed the Hornaday to be a short stream drained a few miles inland by a large lake.

It was not until 1949 that aerial photography by the Royal Canadian Air Force produced a Topographical Survey showing the 190-kilometre (120 mi) Hornaday. But the photographs were not used to create Canada's 1952 Geographical Branch, Department of Mines and Technical Surveys map as, again, the Hornaday is charted as a short stream.

After studying maps and aerial photographs, and investigating the area in 1951 with geomorphologist J. Ross Mackay. J. Keith Fraser of the Geographical Branch, Department of Mines and Technical Surveys ascertained that the Roncière did in fact exist; it was now known as the Hornaday.

=== Archaeology ===
Hundreds of archaeological sites have been found along the Hornaday within Tuktut Nogait from Thule culture times or earlier. Most of the campsites are temporary, seasonal, or multi-generational. They include markers, rock alignments, hearths, hunting blinds, meat-drying areas, and artifacts, such as komatik parts.

=== Mining ===
An old coal mine site (69°10′N 123°22′W), both open-pit mining and underground, is located on the west side of the Hornaday River, north of the junction between George Creek and Rummy Creek, and 32 kilometres (20 mi) southeast of Paulatuk. It operated during the period of 1936 to 1941.

== See also ==
- List of rivers of the Northwest Territories
- List of rivers of Nunavut
