= Tuktut Nogait National Park =

National park in Northwest Territories, Canada

- Parc national Tuktut Nogait
- IUCN category II (national park)
- Location within Canada Location within Northwest Territories
- Interactive map of Tuktut Nogait National Park
- Location: Northwest Territories, Canada
- Nearest city: Paulatuk
- Coordinates: 68°49′07″N 121°44′57″W
- Area: 18,100 km^{2} (7,000 sq mi)
- Established: 1998
- Visitors: 12 (in 2022–23)
- Governing body: Parks Canada

Tuktut Nogait National Park (/ˈtʊktʊt noʊˈɡaɪt/) is a national park located in the Northwest Territories of Canada that was established in 1998. Meaning "young caribou" in Inuvialuktun, the park is home to the calving grounds of the Bluenose-West caribou herd.

== Wildlife ==
It is also the home to other wildlife species which are muskoxen, grizzly bears, Arctic chars, red foxes, wolverines, Arctic ground squirrels, collared lemmings, and Mackenzie River wolves. Tuktut Nogait is a major breeding and nesting ground for a wide variety of migratory birds. Raptors such as peregrine falcons, rough-legged hawks, gyrfalcons and golden eagles nest along the steep walls of river canyons.

=== Dolphin-Union Caribou herd ===
The Dolphin-Union Caribou herd which normally occupies Victoria Island and winters in the Bathurst area of Nunavut, sometimes migrates as far as Tuktut Nogait National Park following the shoreline in search of windswept areas where the snow cover is cleared making it easier for them to graze.

== Geography ==
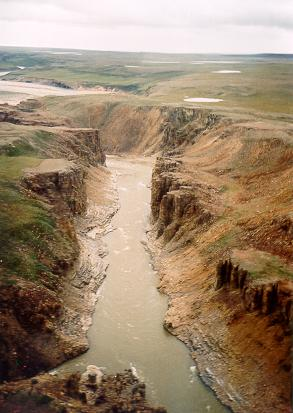
Hornaday River

The park encompasses over 18,000 square kilometres (6,900 sq mi) and is located 170 kilometres (110 mi) north of the Arctic Circle in the northeast corner of mainland Northwest Territories.

=== Rivers ===
The main rivers that run through the park are the Hornaday River, Brock River and Roscoe River.

== History ==
Humans have occupied Tuktut Nogait since AD 1000 and recent surveys have identified over 400 archaeological sites in the park, including remnants of campsites, food caches, graves, and kayak rests. The oldest known archaeological sites are most likely Thule or Copper Inuit ranging from AD 1200 to 1500.

Father Émile Petitot was the first European to reach the area in 1867-68. In 1930, the Hudson's Bay Company established an outpost at Letty Harbour but the post was closed in 1937 due to insufficient trade. In 1935, a Roman Catholic Mission was located at Paulatuk and operated a small trading post there until 1954. The Inuit who came to Paulatuk and the Darnley Bay area were primarily Mackenzie and Alaskan Inuit from the west. In 1955, most people abandoned the Paulatuk mission and moved to Cape Parry where a Distant Early Warning (DEW) line site was being built, which meant seasonal construction and permanent wage labour work.

As is outlined in the Inuvialuit Final Agreement and the Tuktut Nogait Agreement, Inuvialuit beneficiaries have the right to pursue subsistence harvesting within the park. Currently, this takes place in the north-western part of the park and mostly entails fishing Arctic char, hunting caribou, and some trapping. By federal national parks legislation, commercial or sport hunting is not permitted.

=== Park initatives ===
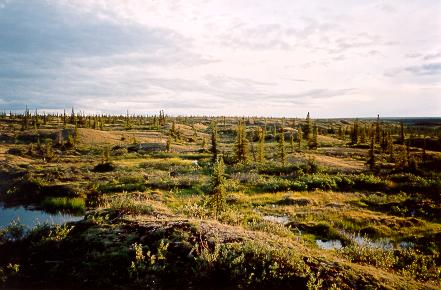
Evening shadows on tundra

Current park initiatives include establishing a base camp facility at Uyarsivik Lake to support ecological integrity and cultural resource monitoring, visitor opportunities, management meetings and youth outreach; developing a cultural resource strategy; and updating interpretive materials such as the Hornaday River guide.

=== Caribou herds ===
There are four barren-ground caribou herds in the Northwest Territories—Cape Bathurst, Bluenose West, Bluenose East and Bathurst caribou herd. The Bluenose East caribou herd began a recovery with a population of approximately 122,000 in 2010, which is being credited to the establishment of Tuktut Nogait National Park. According to T. Davison 2010, CARMA 2011, the three other herds "declined 84-93% from peak sizes in the mid-1980s and 1990s.

== See also ==
- National Parks of Canada
- List of National Parks of Canada
- List of Northwest Territories parks
