= Gallery Arcturus =

Art museum in Toronto, Canada

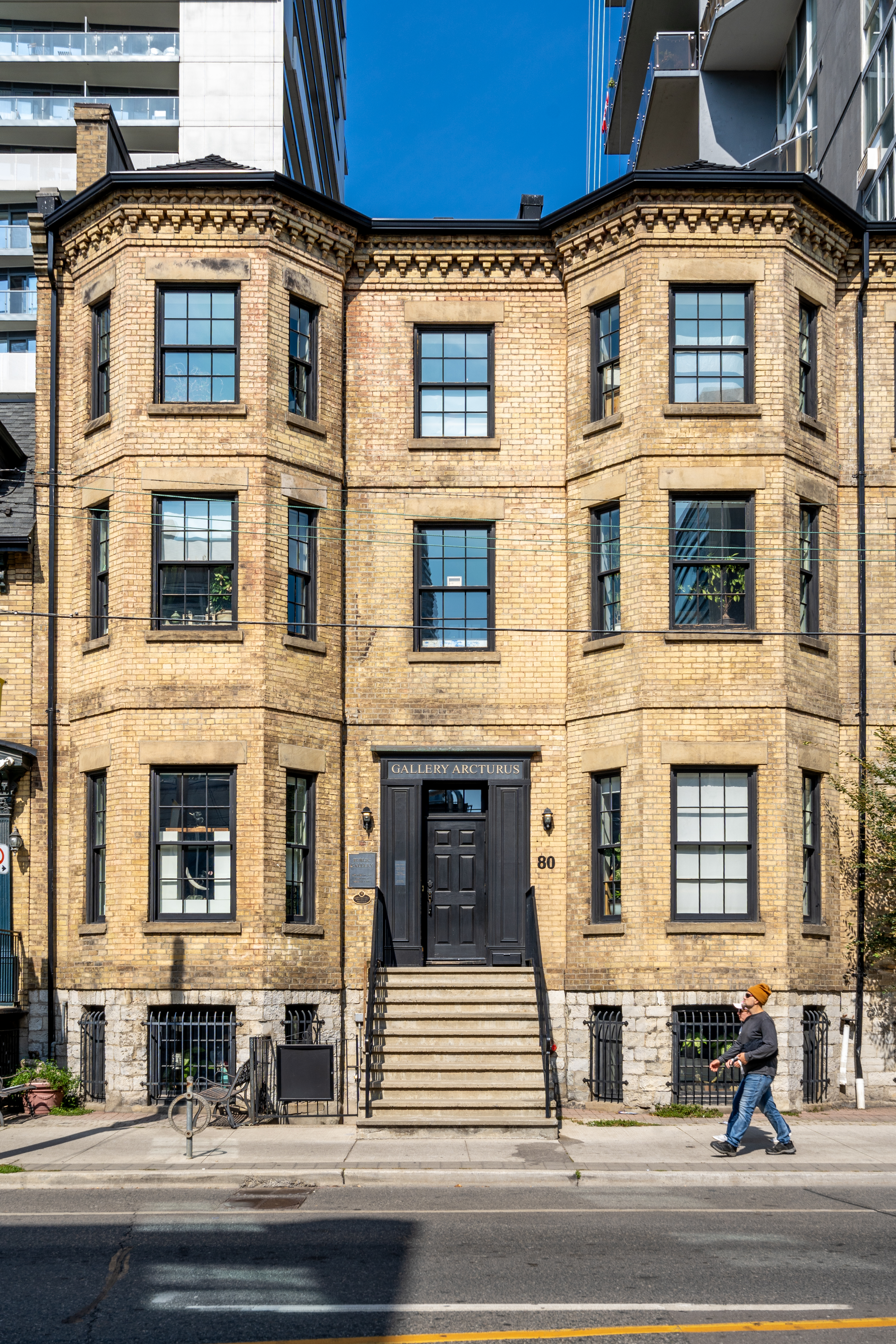
- Exterior view of Gallery Arcturus

- Location of the museum in Toronto
- Established: 1994
- Location: 80 Gerrard Street East; Toronto, Ontario; M5B 1G6
- Coordinates: 43.6600986°N 79.3780152°W
- Type: Art museum
- Curator: Deborah Harris
- Public transit access: College, TMU; 506 505
- Website: arcturus.ca

Ontario Heritage Act
- Type: Part IV
- Designated: May 28, 1979

Gallery Arcturus is an art gallery and museum in downtown Toronto, Ontario, Canada. It is located in the Garden District neighbourhood on Gerrard Street East near Allan Gardens and Toronto Metropolitan University and the Church and Wellesley area. The gallery is a member of Galeries Ontario / Ontario Galleries.

The museum operates as a public, not-for-profit contemporary art gallery with a permanent art collection of over 200 works including drawings, paintings, collages, photographs and sculptures made by notable North American artists including the photographer Simeon Posen, the Inuit art sculptor Floyd Kuptana, and the renowned artist, teacher, writer, and founder of the School of Reductionism, E.J. Gold. Established in 1994 and opening in its present location in 1997, Gallery Arcturus has held many public exhibitions including Thomas Henrickson "Inner Mirror", E.J. Gold "Large As Life", Peter Banks "Emergence", Carol George "Asia Calling", Deborah Harris "Toward the One", and Dominique Cruchet & Joan Cullen "Crossing the Great Waters". The artist-in-residence and curator of the gallery is Deborah Harris.

== History ==
Gallery Arcturus was established in 1994 by the Foundation for the Study of Objective Art, a Canadian federally registered charitable organization, to provide the public with an opportunity to view and study works by contemporary North American artists free of charge and without commercial motives. The gallery was first located in rented space on Parliament Street in Toronto. The gallery began acquiring an extensive permanent art collection for display and study, starting with a significant purchase of works by members of the "School of Reductionism" in Grass Valley, California, including paintings by E.J. Gold, Della Haywood, Heather Valencia, Robert Trice and Kelly Rivera.

In 1997, the Foundation for the Study of Objective Art purchased a 10,000 square foot heritage building located at 80 Gerrard Street East in downtown Toronto and renovated it to serve as the permanent location for the gallery and its administrative offices. The Gallery Arcturus building, in addition to being a historic property (built in 1858 in the Georgian Revival style and may be known as the Green House), was immortalized by the famous Canadian Group of Seven artist Lawren Harris in a 1912 painting entitled Houses, Gerrard Street, Toronto (now part of the McMichael Canadian Art Collection).

The permanent art collection has grown every year and totals over 225 works of art. Pieces from the collection are often displayed as part of new exhibits or installations. Shows tend to debut every six to eight weeks, with each space changing at different time intervals.

== Exhibition spaces ==
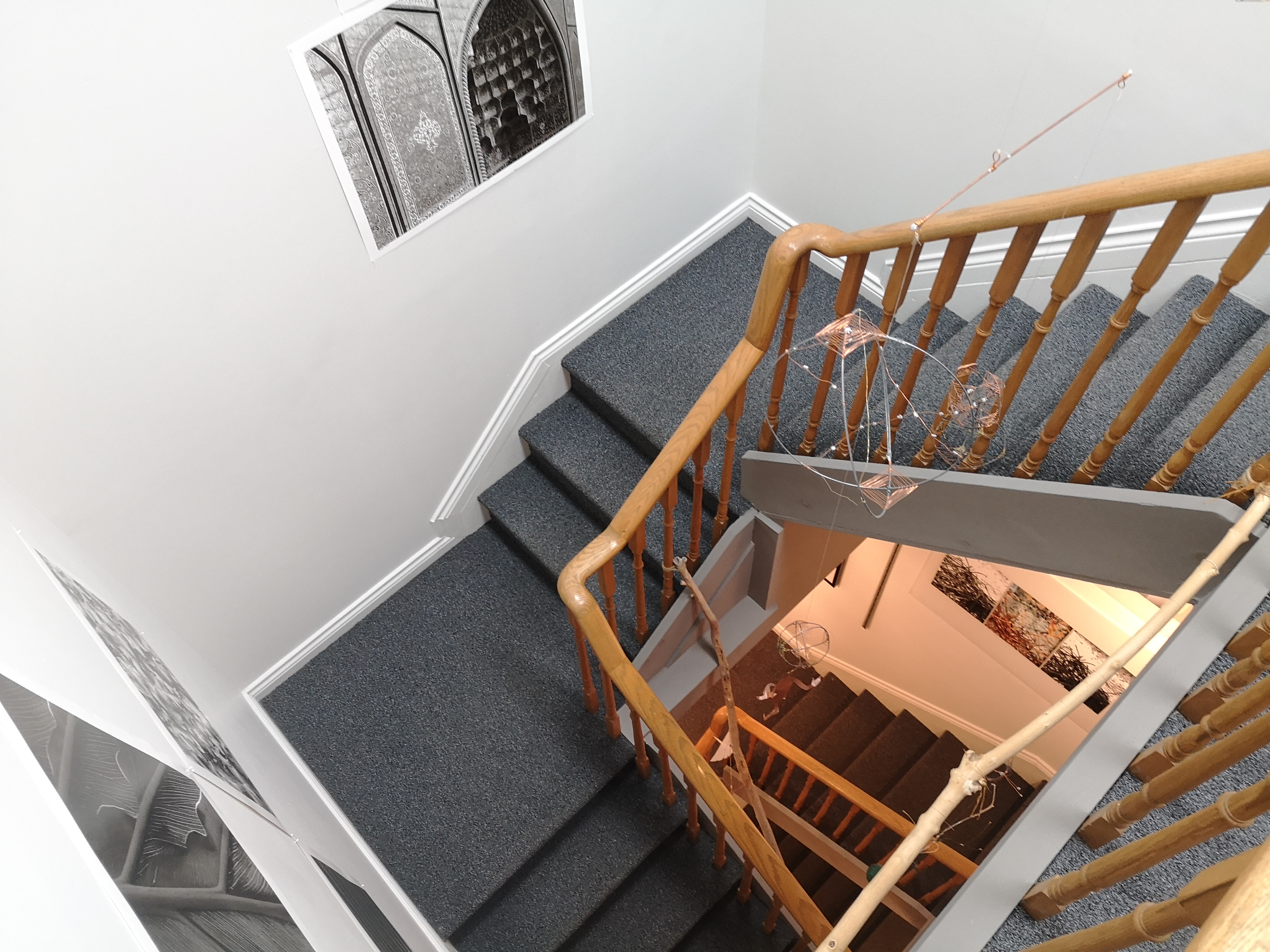
View from the top level of the Ascending Gallery.

Gallery Arcturus consists of nine exhibit areas: Genesis West and East, Up North, Collage, Photographic and Ascending Galleries as well as the Library and the Drawing and Dark Rooms.

The Genesis Gallery is the space where artists are invited to create work in response to an inquiry initiated by curator and artistic director Deborah Harris. The Up North Gallery features landscape paintings and sculptures reflecting northern Canada. Sculptures by Floyd Kuptana are displayed in the Library which also includes artworks and books by E.J. Gold. The Collage Gallery adjoins this second-floor space with works by Deborah Harris and other artists currently working in collage.

The Ascending Gallery, extending from the first to the fourth floor, features works by many of the gallery's collected artists including photographer Simeon Posen and multiple media artist Sae Kimura.

The third floor is currently consists of three exhibit spaces: the Drawing Room, the Dark Room, and the Photographic Gallery. The Drawing Room features graphite and pencil drawings by Daniel Hanequand as well as works by other artists in pencil, ink and charcoal. The Photographic Gallery overlooks Gerrard Street and features photographs from the permanent collection as well as selections from previous shows of the CONTACT Photography Festival, Toronto's yearly celebration of photo art.

== Permanent collection ==
The Gallery Arcturus permanent art collection includes the following artists: Dara Aram, Gisele Boulianne, William Caldwell, Peter Chung, Ed Cramer, Dominique Cruchet, Joan Cullen, Carol Currie and Stuart Leggett, Chris Dolan, Marie Fournier, Neil Fox, Camie Geary-Martin, Luke Gilliam, E.J. Gold, Jeremy Gordaneer, Christopher Griffin, Scott Griffin, Marni Grossman, Deborah Harris, Michael Hayes, Della Heywood, Lenka Holubec, Randy Hryhorczuk, Louis Irkok Jr, Olena Kassian, Floyd Kuptana, Dongmin Lai, Grabriel Lalonde, Chris Langstroth, Elaine Ling, Yousha Liu, Ruth Luginbuehl, Jorge Luna, Andrea Maguire, Eric McConnachie, Larry Middlestadt, Sharon Naidos, Joachim Oepkes, Simeon Posen, Terri Quinn, Kelly Rivera, Wendy Rombough, Paul Saari, R.C. Trice, Heather Valencia, Susan Valyi, Francine Vernac, Irena Vormittag and Pamela Williams.

== See also ==
- List of art museums
- List of museums in Toronto
