= Constantine Scollen =

Irish Roman Catholic priest

Rev Father Constantine Scollen around 1873

Father Con Scollen, OMI. (4 April 1841 – 8 November 1902), was an Irish Catholic, Missionary priest who lived among and evangelized the Blackfoot, Cree and Métis peoples on the Canadian Prairies and in northern Montana in the United States. He also ministered to the Ktunaxa people (Kootenay) on their annual visits to Fort Macleod, from British Columbia. Later he worked among the indigenous peoples in modern-day North Dakota and Wyoming, then Nebraska, Kansas, Illinois and Ohio.

== Early life ==
Constantine Michael Scollen was born on Galloon Island, Upper Lough Erne, near the village of Newtonbutler, County Fermanagh, Ireland, on 4 April 1841. His parents were Patrick Scollen and Margaret Scollen, (née McDermott). His mother died in 1847 during the Great Famine and his father moved to England and worked as a warehouseman in Manningham, Bradford, silk mill, West Yorkshire. He then married his cousin, Catherine McEvoy, in 1851, and later moved his family to Crook, County Durham, England where he found work as a coal-miner. Scollen received a classical education at Ushaw College (St. Cuthbert's College, Ushaw Moor, a Catholic seminary from 1808 until 2011) on the outskirts of the city of Durham and just a few miles from Crook. His tutor, Father Brook, hoped that Scollen would continue his studies, in Rome, (possibly English College, Rome). His much older cousin, Msg. Thomas Louis Connolly, a Franciscan Capuchin, Order of Friars Minor Capuchin, had become Archbishop of Halifax, Nova Scotia, Canada in 1854. Two of his friends, Bro. Matthews and Bro. Lawrence Tivenan had already joined the Missionary Oblates of Mary Immaculate, so he decided to join them and to become a lay brother in the hope of studying for the priesthood, later. On 14 August 1858, he entered their novitiate," Lys Marie", in nearby North Yorkshire in the village of Sicklinghall, close to Wetherby near Leeds. He professed his provisional vows on 15 August 1859 and went to the Oblate retreat house, "Glenmary" in Inchicore village, south of Dublin and " took the habit" and taught there until March 1862. He had volunteered to join the missions in Canada when Mgr Alexandre-Antonin Tache visited Ireland in late 1861, on his way to Rome.(Oblates were never posted abroad.They had to be volunteers). On 25 March 1862, back in Sicklinghall, he made his temporary vows as an Oblate brother under Father Boisrame.

== In Canada ==
In April 1862 he and another Irish scholastic, Brother John Duffy, traveled, on an Allan Line Royal Mail Steamers ship, the SS Norwegian, with Mgr. Tache, on his return to Canada following his visit to a General Chapter in Rome, along with newly ordained Father Emile Petitot. They arrived in Fort Garry (Winnipeg) on 26 May 1862. Father Albert Lacombe then took Scollen across the prairies to St. Albert, Alberta. For parts of these journeys, they were accompanied by members of the "Overlanders", who were a group of would be gold miners, mainly from Ontario, involved in the Cariboo Gold Rush to British Columbia. He opened an English language school for children of the employees of the Hudson's Bay Company, at nearby Fort Edmonton. He then immediately began studying the Cree language, the first of his later to be six first nations tongues, along with French which was the language of the other oblates.

In 1867 there was a famine in the district so it became necessary to disperse the families to other posts in other areas. This greatly reduced the number of pupils so the school closed in 1868. He had taken his perpetual vows as a scholastic on 15 August 1865 on the understanding that he would be allowed to study for the priesthood. After some delays and interruptions caused by long periods out on the prairies living with the native peoples, he was able to continue his philosophy and theology studies under Father Vital Fourmond and was ordained on Easter Saturday 12 April 1873 by Bishop Grandin. He immediately left St Albert to begin his mission to the Blackfoot, on the Prairies. He was accompanied by fellow Oblate priest Fr Vital Fourmond as his superior. The group included Louis Daze, a French Canadian whose brother was an Oblate priest in Ottawa, who acted as a lay brother.(Daze died in a blizzard a year later while attempting to recover straying horses.) The group also included two others, Alexis Cardinal, a Metis and Jean-Baptiste L'heureux, a French Canadian, who acted as hunters, guides, catechists and interpreters (Scollen had begun studying Blackfoot in 1868 and was already fluent in both Cree and Chippewa) For the next eight years he remained mainly with the Blackfoot (Siksika Nation) and Kainai Blood people on the plains of Southern Alberta and Northern Montana, living their hard nomadic life without break apart from brief spring and autumn visits to St Albert, for supplies and to Fort Macleod.

He is particularly remembered for having the first building erected (by Alexis Cardinal, a Cree speaking Metis) in what is now, Calgary, Alberta, in 1872. In 1876 he was an unofficial interpreter for some of the Plains Cree Chiefs (Peter Erasmus Jnr., a half Danish Metis, Methodist minister, was interpreter for the other chiefs and Governor Morris) and witness to Treaty 6 between the Cree and the Canadian government. (The Woods Cree and Swampy Cree made a separate treaty with the Canadian government) He was an unpaid consultant to the Canadian government prior to the signing of Treaty 7 with the Blackfoot Confederacy, in 1877 and was again an unofficial interpreter and witness. Jean L'heureux became official interpreter because of the shortcomings of Jerry Potts. Scollen took great care to avoid politics but following the failure of the Dominion government to fulfill its treaty obligations, he became very outspoken, on behalf of the native peoples and remained so for the rest of his life. In 1870, he had spent the winter at Rocky Mountain House, co-writing a Cree language grammar and dictionary with his mentor, fellow Oblate and friend, Father Albert Lacombe. His considerable contribution was not acknowledged on publication. ("Dictionnaire de la langue du Cris.1874", "Grammaire de la Langue Cris.1874", "Instructions en Langue Crise sur toute la Doctrine Catholic.1875" and "Petite Manuel pour appredre a lire Langue Crise 1886") There was a further, much later publication entitled "Prieres Cantiques, Catechisme en Langue Crise 1980" which was derived from the original work but accredited to Lacombe only. Scollen also wrote a book of 75 sermons in Cree, for Oblate, Father Joseph Dupin.

In 1880 Alexis Cardinal built a house at Fort Macleod and Scollen spent the winter there. In March 1881 he traveled down to Milk River, Montana via Fort Benton to visit with Crowfoot and successfully persuaded him to return, with his people, to Canada. In October 1881, he left his Blackfoot mission, both mentally and physically exhausted by the brutally hard life. He was appalled by the attitude of the Canadian government towards the native peoples and its failure to adhere to its obligations under the various treaties.(These failures contributed to the 1885 North-West Rebellion/Resistance) He had seen the lives of the native peoples being destroyed by disease, alcohol and starvation and their lands being taken over by European/Canadian settlers. He was an outspoken advocate on their behalf and this combined with being an Irish Catholic caused him great difficulties with the Ontario Orange Order influenced Canadian authorities both civil and military and also with the Wesleyan Church|Wesleyan Methodists. Around that time, there were groups of Irish Republicans (mainly Catholic) living in the United States who twice unsuccessfully attempted to invade Canada. These people were known as "Fenians" in Canada. Although Scollen, as an Irish patriot, was sympathetic to their cause, he was strongly against the use of violence. The same applied to the Metis leader Louis Riel whom Scollen also counseled against using such methods.

In December 1882, he was appointed to parish duties in St Joachim, Edmonton but was stricken by cholera in August 1883. On recovery, he returned to St Albert, ministering and traveling among the local Cree native peoples again. In November 1884, along with Father Gabillion, he re-established a mission to the Cree people at Bears' Hill called Notre Dame de la Sept Douleurs (now Maskwacis, previously called Hobbema, near Edmonton) despite very aggressive opposition from the Methodists who were already firmly established there. During the "1885 North West Rebellion", at the request of the Lt-Governor Edgar Dewdney, he dissuaded the Cree Chief, Bobtail, from joining the hostilities. Some of the younger men had looted the nearby Hudson's Bay Company trading post at Battle River but he was able to calm the situation, get them to close their war camp, to return most of the stolen items and persuaded the Canadian Militia not to take punitive action against the people. Scollen had remained at his post even though he was aware that two of his fellow Oblate priests, Fathers Felix Marchand and Leon Farfard, had been murdered (in the nearby Frog Lake Massacre, by the young Plains Cree warriors of Mistahi-maskwa Big Bear), and all of the white people apart from a Mr Taylor, including the Indian Department officials and his longtime antagonists, the local Methodist missionaries, had fled from his area.

From around 1880, his relationship with the Oblate hierarchy, but not his fellow missionaries, had been becoming strained. His mental health had deteriorated and his behaviour had become erratic. He decided to become a secular priest and eventually resigned from the Oblates in July 1885. He was destitute and asked the Canadian government for help. They granted him 150 dollars in recognition of his work at Bears' Hill, (formerly known as Hobbema but now as Maskwacis) preventing hostilities during the Riel rebellion.(Father Lacombe had been granted 1000 dollars for his activities among the Blackfoot.) In November 1885, he asked to be allowed to return to the Oblates and Bishop Grandin sent him to the Oblate noviciate in Tewksbury, near Lowell, Massachusetts, USA for rehabilitation and to renew his vocation. He failed to complete his novitiate there so Bishop Grandin ordered him to go to yet another novitiate Lachine, Quebec but instead Scollen went to see Bishop Tache in St Boniface (Winnipeg). Tache sent him to St. Laurent, Manitoba to stay with his old tutor, Fr Fourmond, pending a decision on his readmission. He spent a year there as a secular priest, among the Irish, French and Métis people at St Laurent and at Duck Lake.

== In the United States ==
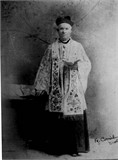
Father Constantine Scollen in approx 1900

In February 1887, having had his application to rejoin the Oblates rejected and having largely recovered from his breakdown but not the chronic rheumatism and tuberculosis, he crossed into the US to work among the native peoples of the Great Plains for the next 10 years, on already established missions. During 1887 and 1888 he was among the Turtle Mountain Chippewa people at St. Michael Mission, St. John, North Dakota and applied to become a citizen of the United States, during this period. However, his US Citizenship was not formalized until 2 October 1900 at Urbana, Champaign County Probate Court. 1889 to 1892 saw him among the Arapaho and Shoshone peoples at St Stephen Mission, near Arapahoe, Fremont, Wyoming (Wind River Indian Reservation) It was here that he carried out the first detailed scholarly study of the Arapaho language and produced a written form which was used by subsequent Catholic missionaries. (In 1889, the Welsh Episcopalian missionary, Rev. John Roberts, along with an Arapahoe catechist on the same reservation, wrote a translation of the Lord's Prayer into Arapahoe.) Between 1892 and 1894 he was at St John the Baptist (now Holy Name Mission) Sheridan, Wyoming, then St Joseph's in Buffalo, Wyoming and St Patrick's in Rawlins, Wyoming. 1895/1896 at St Mary, Orleans, Nebraska. 1897/1898 at Our Lady of Perpetual Help, Concordia, Kansas. He then left the "Indian" missions and stayed a few months at St. Joseph's in Chicago. After a period on parish missions in New England, his three final years were spent working in the parishes of St Joseph, Dayton, Immaculate Conception, Kenton, Ohio and St Mary, Urbana, Ohio (late 1899 – 1902) and conducting parish missions throughout Ohio. He died in St Elizabeth Hospital, Dayton, Ohio in 1902 having been a TB patient there, for some months, in the care of the Franciscan Sisters of the Poor. Scollen had not maintained contact with the Oblates, but renewed correspondence with Fr Lacombe, in the year before his death. Shortly before he died, Mgr Adelard Langevin, successor to Tache as Archbishop of St Boniface, Manitoba, recognised that Scollen had always remained an Oblate, at heart, and made him an honorary member of the order. In 1883, he wrote a Blackfoot dictionary and grammar for Oblate Fathers Leon Doucet and Emile-Joseph Legal and to Father Lacombe he gave a grammar, catechism and hymns, in Blackfoot, all written and composed by him. Being a capable violinist, he also wrote the music. In Wyoming between 1889 and 1893, he created an Arapaho alphabet and orthology. It was possibly the first example of a written form of the language for which he may have used some of the symbols, invented by an English Methodist missionary in Canada, which he had adapted and used for his five earlier Canadian First Nation languages. His original notebook is in the Smithsonian Institution, Washington DC. However, Scollen's writings were not directly for the use of the Native people. They were intended to be tools for his fellow missionaries, to enable them to communicate their religious message, more effectively, by enabling them to use the mother tongues of their various native communities.

Scollen was a polymath. In addition to his linguistic skills, he was a Scholar in music, history and theology and a skilled writer in numerous languages. He had a talent for languages and became the foremost linguist in the Oblates of Mary Immaculate, in Canada. In addition to his bi-lingual childhood tongues of Irish Gaelic and English he was fluent in Greek, Latin, French, Italian, German and the First Nations languages of Cree, Chippewa (Ojibwe), Blackfoot, Sarcee, Assiniboine and Arapaho. (Most of these native languages belong to the Algonquian languages|Algonquin family) He taught English to his missionaries (who were all native French speakers) and First Nation languages to new arrivals.

He was the only native English speaking Oblates of Mary Immaculate priest among his exclusively French and French Canadian fellow priests, in Rupert's Land and the Northwest Territories and was the first priest to establish a mission for and live among the Blackfoot people, in Canada. (Albert Lacombe had been a visiting missionary to the Canadian Blackfoot prior to Scollen and the Jesuits had spent many years among the Piegan Blackfoot, Piegan Blackfeet|Southern Piikani, below the international border in the now Montana, USA). Scollen's intervention with his friend Isapo-Muxika, Chief Crowfoot of the Blackfoot Confederacy in 1879, near Fort Macleod and again with Kesayiwew, Chief Bobtail (Alexis Piche) of the Cree in 1885, at Bears' Hill, near Edmonton, helped to avoid bloodshed, in both instances. He was also a good friend of Wikaskokiseyin, Chief Sweet Grass, also Cree, together with Sotenah, Rainy Chief, head chief of the North Piegans (Kainai or Bloods). He was also acquainted with Sitting Bull when in exile in Canada. During his years among the Blackfoot peoples he was loyally supported by Fr Leon Doucet who was based at Our Lady of Peace Mission near Calgary.

Scollen lived through a traumatic period for the native peoples of Canada. When he arrived in Fort Edmonton in 1862, the people were fit and healthy and their lives were based around the buffalo (bison). They were free to follow the herds across the prairies and the buffalo were abundant. By the time he left, in 1887, their lives had been changed forever. The buffalo herds had gone. The people had been devastated by alcoholism, disease, starvation and exploitation. Their land had been taken from them, by Canada. They could no longer roam freely and were restricted to living on reserves. Their lives were ruled by government appointed "Indian agents" and farm managers who often used their positions to exploit the people and divert the meagre resources, intended for those people, to their own use. The government also failed to meet their treaty obligations. Often, provisions were inadequate and tools were of poor quality and quantity. Living amongst the Blackfoot Confederacy, in the now South Alberta and Montana (the land of the Whisky Traders known as the Whoop Up Trail) Scollen was a witness to all of this and spoke out for justice for the native peoples, to his great cost. Without knowing it, he was a "Revolutionary Priest" although, a believer in non-violence.

== The missing manuscript ==
Scollen's scholarly work, "Thirty Years Among the Indians of the North West," extending to 250 pages, was never published. On his death in Dayton, Ohio, in 1902, the precious manuscript was taken into the safekeeping of his friend, Rev. Fr. Anthony Stanislaus Siebenfoercher, pastor of Immaculate Conception Church, Kenton, Hardin County, Ohio. Fr Siebenfoercher died in Dayton, Ohio on 8 November 1911. At the time he was taken ill, in 1908, he was the Spiritual Director of Athenaeum of Ohio-Mount St. Mary Seminary, Cincinnati. His papers would also have included Father Scollen's manuscript. During his three years in St Elizabeth hospital, Dayton, it is possible that the seminary would have placed his papers in safe storage, awaiting his return. Unfortunately, he died in 1911, still at the hospital and the seminary now has no record of what happened to them. To date, no-one has been able to discover the whereabouts of these important historical and anthropological documents. When Siebenfoercher died, he had a surviving sister, Mary, living in Tiffin, Ohio. Mary was the widow of John A. Canter (Snr) and she died in 1922. She was possibly, living with her son Anthony Richard Canter and he died in 1943. A genealogical enquiry traced Mary's great-grandson, John Domann, living in California in early 2012 but the family had no knowledge of what had happened to the papers. Around 2011, the Wyoming Newspaper Project digitised the records of newspapers throughout the state. These included those of the Bulletin, a weekly newspaper published in Buffalo, Wyoming to which, during 1893 and 1894, Scollen wrote a series of forty two letters based on his journals and his manuscript. A book, "The search for Thirty Years Among the Indians of the North West" was written by the author of this article. It contains all the letters but is not on public sale. However, a copy has been placed with the reference library of the Glenbow Museum in Calgary, Alberta, Canada and can be perused by visiting researchers. Similarly, also not on public sale, the book Father Con, the Whoop Up Trail Priest a biography of Scollen, by the same author has also been placed with the Glenbow reference library.

== Memorials ==
In 1939, a cairn was built at Jumping Pound to mark the site of the first chapel built by Alexis Cardinal, for Father Scollen. It used some of the stones which were part of the original hearth and chimney and is just south of the town of Cochrane, Calgary, Alberta. In 1976, it was designated as a Canadian National Historic site.

The Father Scollen School, Scollen Street and Scollen Bridge, all in Calgary, Alberta, Canada, were named in his honour.

His grave-marker in the priests' section of Calvary Cemetery, Dayton, Ohio USA shows his name incorrectly as "Cornelius." His date of birth is also shown incorrectly. Following research by Michael Quinn of Ohio, we now know that Scollen deliberately gave a misleading name to the bishop when he arrived in Dayton Ohio in 1898. He did not want his former colleagues in the Oblates to be able to trace him. He possibly, also, gave a misleading date of birth, for the same reason. The cemetery authorities have wisely retained the historic original marker but kindly added a notice giving the correct details, and quoting part of this Wikipedia entry.
