= Floyd Kuptana =

Canadian artist (1964–2021)

- Born: 14 February 1964; Cape Parry, Northwest Territories, Canada
- Died: 25 May 2021 (aged 57); Toronto, Ontario, Canada
- Education: David Ruben Piqtoukun
- Known for: Sculpture, Inuit art

Floyd Kuptana (14 February 1964 – 25 May 2021) was an Inuvialuk (Inuk) artist in Canada whose work is primarily stone carvings as well as paintings and collage.

Modern Inuit art developed in the latter half of the 20th century as Indigenous peoples of the Canadian Arctic and subarctic regions began living in fixed communities in the late 1940s. As the number of artists increased and the Canadian government promoted stone carving and work in other media, contemporary Inuit art grew in popularity in Canada and other countries.

== Life ==
Kuptana was born in a settlement near the former Distant Early Warning Line station at Cape Parry, Northwest Territories, Canada and later moved with his family to nearby Paulatuk. He began his career by helping cousins Francis and Abraham Anghik Ruben to sand and polish their carvings, later working as an apprentice to David Ruben Piqtoukun, older brother of Abraham and Francis. He produced his own work after leaving the apprenticeship in 1992, and resided in Toronto until his death. His brother, Robert Kuptana, is a carver.

Floyd Kuptana's sculptures of soapstone and other stone often feature shapes of both animal and human. Frequent imagery of transformation may be considered grotesque and include works of Sedna the Inuit goddess of the sea and marine animals. His work relates both to the Inuit religion and his own experiences.

After coming in contact in the late 2000s with Gallery Arcturus, a public art museum and education centre in Toronto, Kuptana began working with paint, depicting animals in bright colours on found materials such as wood and later on art board and canvas. The artist also worked in collage and pastel. Some of Kuptana's pieces entered the market via commercial galleries including a leading source of First Nations artwork in Toronto, Bay of Spirits. Most were sold by the artist himself for private collections in Canada, the United States and other countries.

The piece known as "Self-portrait by Floyd Kuptana" was acquired in 2007 by Library and Archives Canada and appeared in a 2018 joint exhibit at the Glenbow art and history museum in Calgary.

The Winnipeg Art Gallery which specializes in showcasing northern art has in its Qaumajuq collection a Kuptana work known as "Untitled (Skull), 2000", gifted by the Eric Sprott Family.

The work "Seal Transformation," 2001, made of stone, antler and steel is in the collection of the Art Gallery of Ontario according to the Inuit Art Foundation.

Multiple works by Kuptana are in the permanent collection of Toronto contemporary art museum Gallery Arcturus. During 2018, an exhibit space on the gallery's second floor was created to showcase the artist's work in various media, as well as pieces created in collaboration with other artists. Upon the one year anniversary of his death in 2022 an extensive retrospective of his work began at the public art museum, including many large works from the artist's former collaborator Jean Paul Albert.

Floyd Kuptana died in Toronto on 25 May 2021.

== Exhibitions ==
- "STILL WITH US / from another world / Daniel meets Floyd" retrospective at Gallery Arcturus, Toronto, 27 May 2022 - present
- "The Artist's Mirror: Self Portraits" at the Glenbow, Calgary, 10 March 2018 – 6 January 2019
- "Sedna lamenting the loss of sea ice" at "Linked" at the Oceanographic Museum, Monaco, 29 November 2015 - 29 February 2016
- "Changing Hands: Art Without Reservation 3" travelling exhibit of The Museum of Arts and Design, New York City, 26 June - 21 October 2012
- "Floyd Kuptana ... sculpted from stone and spirit" at Gallery Arcturus, Toronto, 27 September - 12 November 2011
- "In the Shadow of the Midnight Sun" at the National Gallery of Canada, Ottawa, 23 May – 17 August 2008
- "Inuit Sculpture Now" at the National Gallery of Canada, Ottawa, 30 June - 18 November 2007 and the McMichael Collection, Ontario, Canada, 7 July 2006 - 4 September 2006
