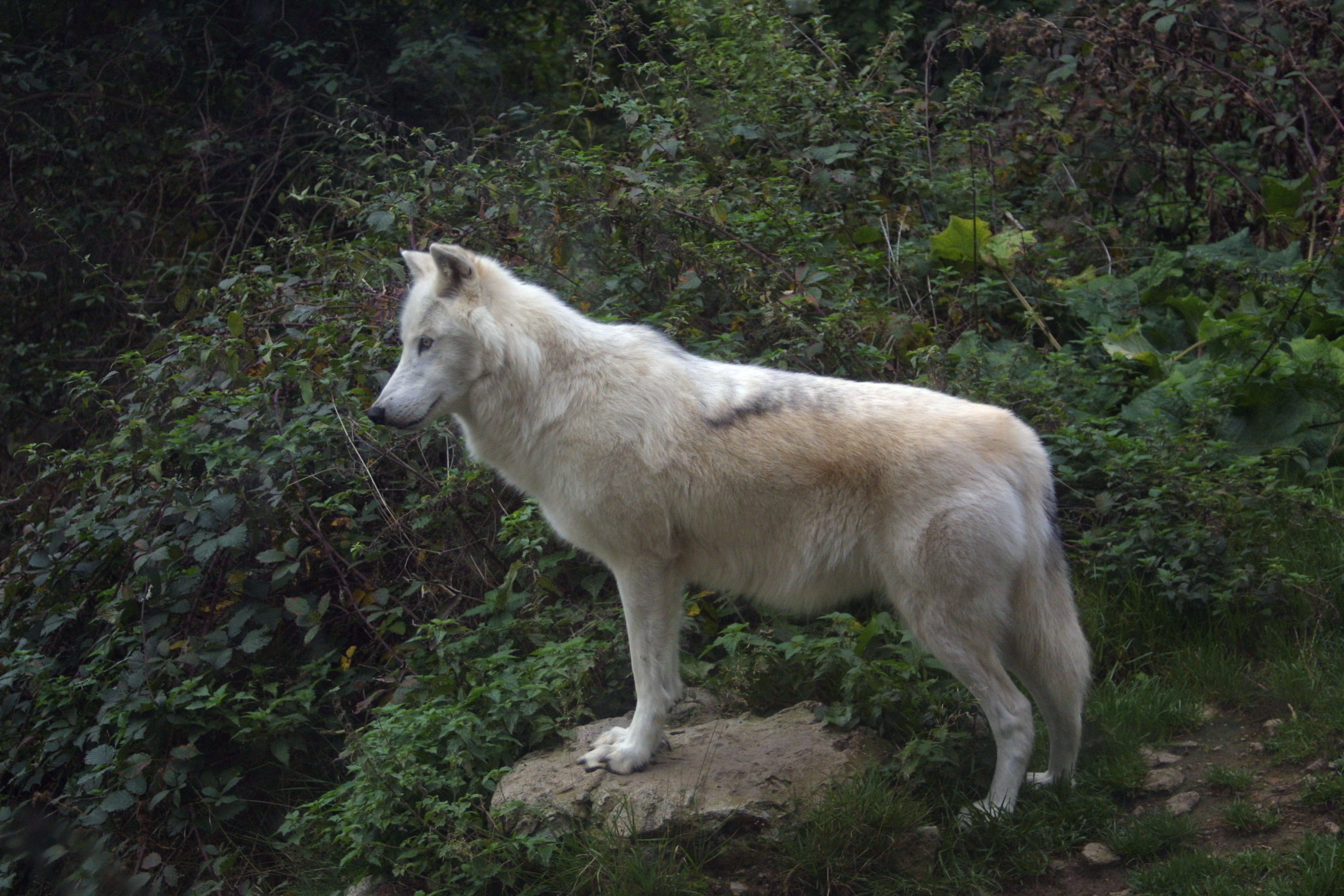

Conservation status
- Secure (NatureServe)

Scientific classification
- Kingdom: Animalia
- Phylum: Chordata
- Class: Mammalia
- Order: Carnivora
- Family: Canidae
- Subfamily: Caninae
- Genus: Canis
- Species: C. lupus
- Subspecies: C. l. mackenzii

Trinomial name
- Canis lupus mackenzii Anderson, 1943 (1908)
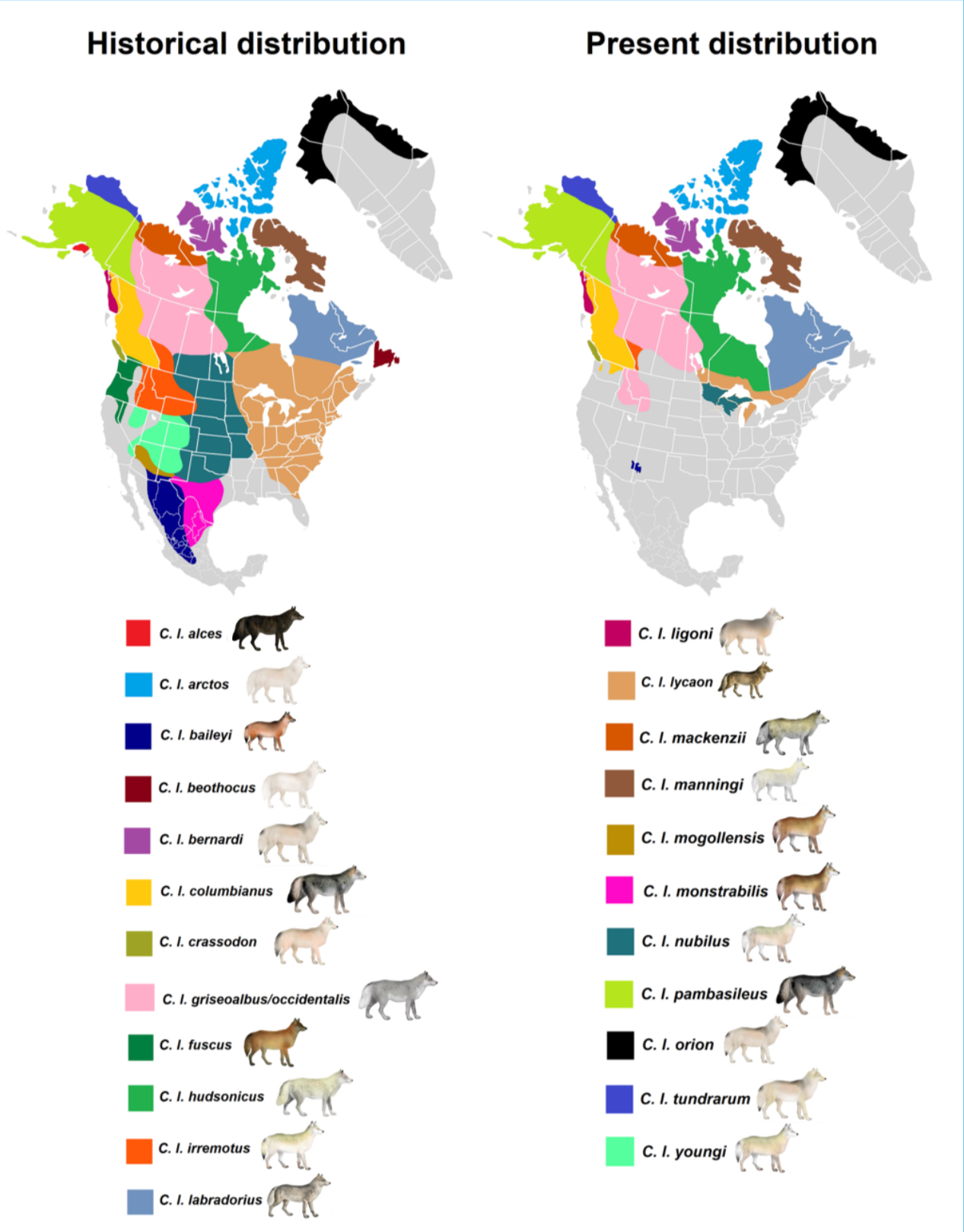
- Historical and present range of gray wolf subspecies in North America

Synonyms
- Canis albus mackenzii

= Mackenzie River wolf =

Subspecies of carnivore

The Mackenzie River wolf or Mackenzie Arctic Wolf (Canis lupus mackenzii) is a subspecies of gray wolf which is found in Canada's southern portion of Northwest Territories. Not much has been published on Canis lupus mackenzii but one of the most comprehensive studies was done in 1954 by W.A. Fuller, Wolf Control Operations, Southern Mackenzie District, Canada Wildlife Service Report. This wolf is recognized as a subspecies of Canis lupus in the taxonomic authority Mammal Species of the World (2005). As of 2025, the general (though not universal) scientific consensus is that it is synonymous with the Northwestern wolf/Mackenzie Valley Wolf.

This wolf subspecies can be found in Tuktut Nogait National Park.
