= De Salis Bay =

Bay in the Northwest Territories, Canada

- Location within Northwest Territories
- Location: Amundsen Gulf
- Coordinates: 71°26′02″N 121°40′10″W
- Ocean/sea sources: Arctic Ocean
- Basin countries: Canada
- Settlements: Uninhabited

De Salis Bay is a Canadian Arctic waterway in the Northwest Territories. It is a northern arm of Amundsen Gulf on southeastern Banks Island where dry tundra is found. The bay was named for the De Salis family by Francis Leopold McClintock while serving with Henry Kellett.
