= Elaine Ling =

Canadian photographer

Elaine Ling

Elaine Ling (December 19, 1946 – August 1, 2016) was a Canadian photographer.

== Life ==
Ling was born in Hong Kong. She immigrated to Canada with her family in the 1950s and grew up in Scarborough, Ontario.

Ling received a medical degree from the University of Toronto, and practised medicine in the Cree Pikangikum First Nation in Northwestern Ontario, Canada, and in Kathmandu, Nepal, where she began taking photographs of female patients with leprosy.

Ling died in Toronto, Ontario August 4, 2016 as a result of lung cancer.

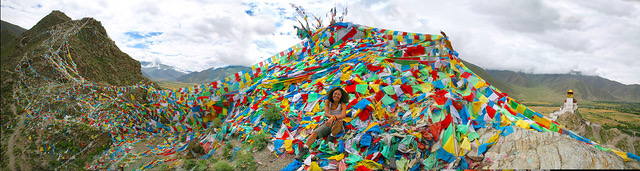
Elaine Ling Tibet, 2007

Canada's Image Centre awards a research fellowship in her honour.

Her brother maintains a website of the artist's work and publications elaineling.ca.

== Collections ==
Her work is included in the collections of the National Gallery of Canada, The Image Centre (Toronto), the Museum of Fine Arts Houston, the Brooklyn Museum and Toronto public art museum Gallery Arcturus.
