= Storkerson Bay =

Bay in the Northwest Territories, Canada

- Location within Northwest Territories
- Location: Amundsen Gulf
- Coordinates: 72°56′02″N 124°52′11″W
- Ocean/sea sources: Arctic Ocean
- Basin countries: Canada
- Settlements: Uninhabited

Storkerson Bay is a Canadian Arctic waterway in the Northwest Territories. It is an arm of Amundsen Gulf on central western Banks Island.

Historically, it has been a wintering area for Inuvialuit families.
