= Cape Parry =

Headland in Canada's Northwest Territories

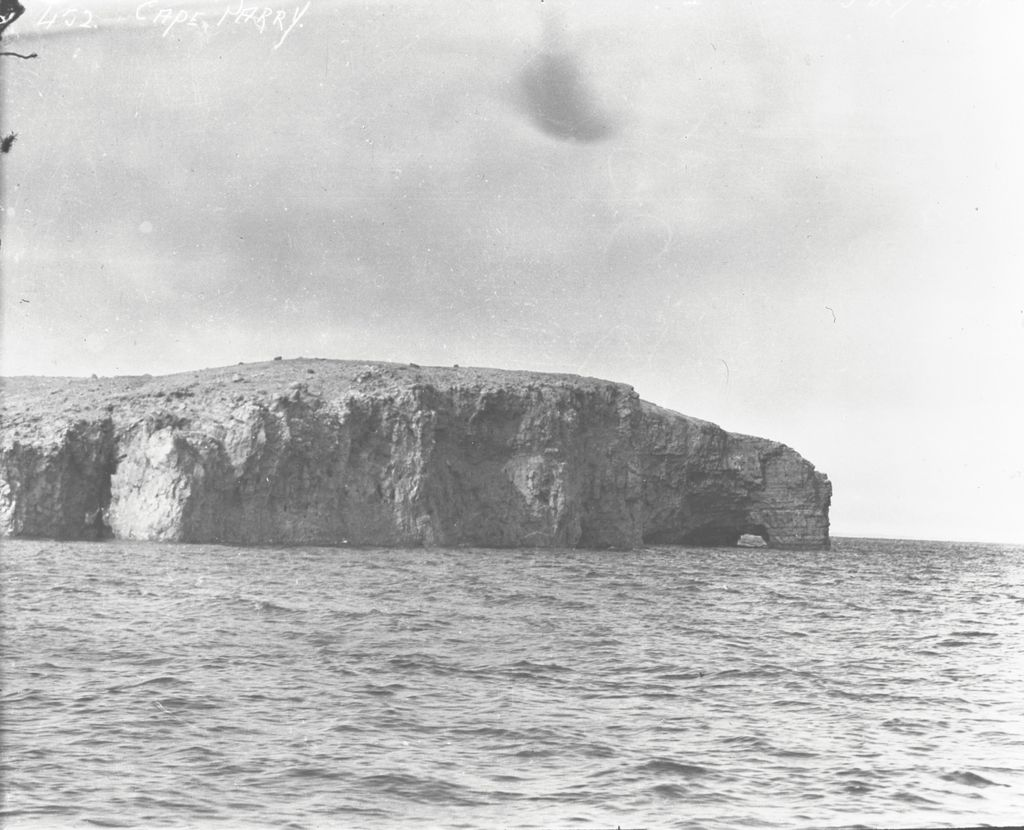
View of Cape Parry from July 24, 1916

Cape Parry is a headland in Canada's Northwest Territories. Located at the northern tip of the Parry Peninsula, it projects into Amundsen Gulf. The nearest settlement is Paulatuk, 100 km (62 mi) to the south, and Fiji Island is located 9 km (5.6 mi) to the west. Cape Parry was formerly accessible through Cape Parry Airport that was located at the Distant Early Warning Line. The airport was listed as abandoned after the closure of the DEW line site.

It is named for the Arctic explorer William Edward Parry.

== History ==
Between the 1950s to the 1980s, a Distant Early Warning Line site (PIN-Main, 70°09′01″N 124°40′09″W) was located south of Police Point, the cape's western point. During the period of 1969 to 1982, eighteen sounding rocket launches were made at Cape Parry.

== Geography ==
Cape Parry is a three-pointed outcrop of coastal cliffs. The limestone formation rises 20 m (66 ft) above sea level. The deeply incised coastal beaches are composed of sand and gravel, and form bays and inlets. On either side of the narrow isthmus that joins Cape Parry to the Parry Peninsula are Tyne Bay to the west and Gillet Bay to the east.

The Cape Parry Migratory Bird Sanctuary is located here, and the coastal waters adjacent to the Cape are protected as part of the Anguniaqvia niqiqyuam Marine Protected Area.

== Climate ==
Absolute minimum temperature is −47.2 °C (−53.0 °F), while absolute maximum temperature is 23.9 °C (75.0 °F). Annual snowfall is 116.0 cm (45.7 in). Although the staffed weather station is no longer in operation there is an automatic weather station (CZCP) at the site.

Climate data for Cape Parry
Month	Jan	Feb	Mar	Apr	May	Jun	Jul	Aug	Sep	Oct	Nov	Dec	Year
Record high humidex	−1.6	−3.5	−1.2	3.4	10.6	22.1	26.9	23.0	18.8	5.0	2.8	−1.8	26.9
Record high °C (°F)	−1.0 (30.2)	−2.4 (27.7)	−0.6 (30.9)	4.0 (39.2)	11.1 (52.0)	24.1 (75.4)	25.8 (78.4)	24.1 (75.4)	18.3 (64.9)	10.7 (51.3)	3.3 (37.9)	−1.7 (28.9)	23.9 (75.0)
Mean daily maximum °C (°F)	−23.1 (−9.6)	−24.4 (−11.9)	−22.3 (−8.1)	−13.7 (7.3)	−4.4 (24.1)	5.0 (41.0)	9.4 (48.9)	8.0 (46.4)	2.8 (37.0)	−4.4 (24.1)	−16.2 (2.8)	−20.2 (−4.4)	−8.6 (16.5)
Daily mean °C (°F)	−26.1 (−15.0)	−27.5 (−17.5)	−25.5 (−13.9)	−17.2 (1.0)	−7.2 (19.0)	2.3 (36.1)	6.3 (43.3)	5.5 (41.9)	1.1 (34.0)	−6.5 (20.3)	−18.9 (−2.0)	−23.2 (−9.8)	−11.4 (11.5)
Mean daily minimum °C (°F)	−29.1 (−20.4)	−30.6 (−23.1)	−28.7 (−19.7)	−20.8 (−5.4)	−9.9 (14.2)	−0.4 (31.3)	3.1 (37.6)	2.9 (37.2)	−0.7 (30.7)	−8.5 (16.7)	−21.6 (−6.9)	−26.0 (−14.8)	−14.2 (6.4)
Record low °C (°F)	−47.2 (−53.0)	−47.2 (−53.0)	−43.4 (−46.1)	−38.9 (−38.0)	−27.8 (−18.0)	−12.2 (10.0)	−3.9 (25.0)	−4.3 (24.3)	−12.8 (9.0)	−28.3 (−18.9)	−36.7 (−34.1)	−41.7 (−43.1)	−47.2 (−53.0)
Record low wind chill	−68.4	−67.3	−60.6	−53.2	−37.2	−22.3	−10.0	−14.0	−21.1	−38.4	−52.5	−61.1	−68.4
Average precipitation mm (inches)	6.7 (0.26)	7.9 (0.31)	5.0 (0.20)	6.1 (0.24)	8.0 (0.31)	9.1 (0.36)	24.5 (0.96)	26.5 (1.04)	27.4 (1.08)	23.2 (0.91)	10.0 (0.39)	6.8 (0.27)	161.2 (6.35)
Average rainfall mm (inches)	0.0 (0.0)	0.0 (0.0)	0.0 (0.0)	0.0 (0.0)	0.7 (0.03)	7.8 (0.31)	23.5 (0.93)	21.9 (0.86)	14.7 (0.58)	0.8 (0.03)	0.0 (0.0)	0.0 (0.0)	69.4 (2.73)
Average snowfall cm (inches)	8.2 (3.2)	10.6 (4.2)	6.6 (2.6)	8.9 (3.5)	10.2 (4.0)	2.1 (0.8)	0.9 (0.4)	3.7 (1.5)	12.9 (5.1)	27.6 (10.9)	15.1 (5.9)	9.3 (3.7)	116.0 (45.7)
Average precipitation days (≥ 0.2 mm)	6.3	7.1	5.9	6.2	6.2	4.7	9.0	10.9	12.1	15.0	8.3	8.4	100.2
Average rainy days (≥ 0.2 mm)	0.0	0.0	0.1	0.1	0.8	3.8	10.1	11.1	7.5	1.1	0.0	0.1	34.6
Average snowy days (≥ 0.2 cm)	8.2	9.6	7.9	8.7	8.3	2.4	0.9	2.7	7.9	16.9	11.1	9.4	93.9
Average relative humidity (%)	78.6	79.4	77.6	81.2	86.1	82.6	79.4	83.4	85.7	85.0	81.4	80.5	81.7
Source: Environment and Climate Change Canada Canadian Climate Normals 1981–2010

== Flora and fauna ==
There is sparse vegetation, except in low-lying wet areas.

Beluga whale, bowhead whale, bearded seal, ringed seal, as well as caribou, grizzly bear, and polar bear, frequent the area.

There are nationally significant populations of common eider, glaucous gull, king eider, long-tailed duck, and yellow-billed loon on the cape. It is also one of only two sites in the western Arctic where black guillemot are thought to breed. The cape's thick-billed murre colony is more isolated than any other murre colony in the world.

== Protection status ==
The cape, an Important Bird Area (NT041), is home to the Cape Parry Migratory Bird Sanctuary (Site 6) which was established in 1961. It is also an International Biological Programme Site (#4-11) and lies within a Key Marine Habitat Site (Site 19).
