= Sweet Grass (Cree chief) =

- Cree chief
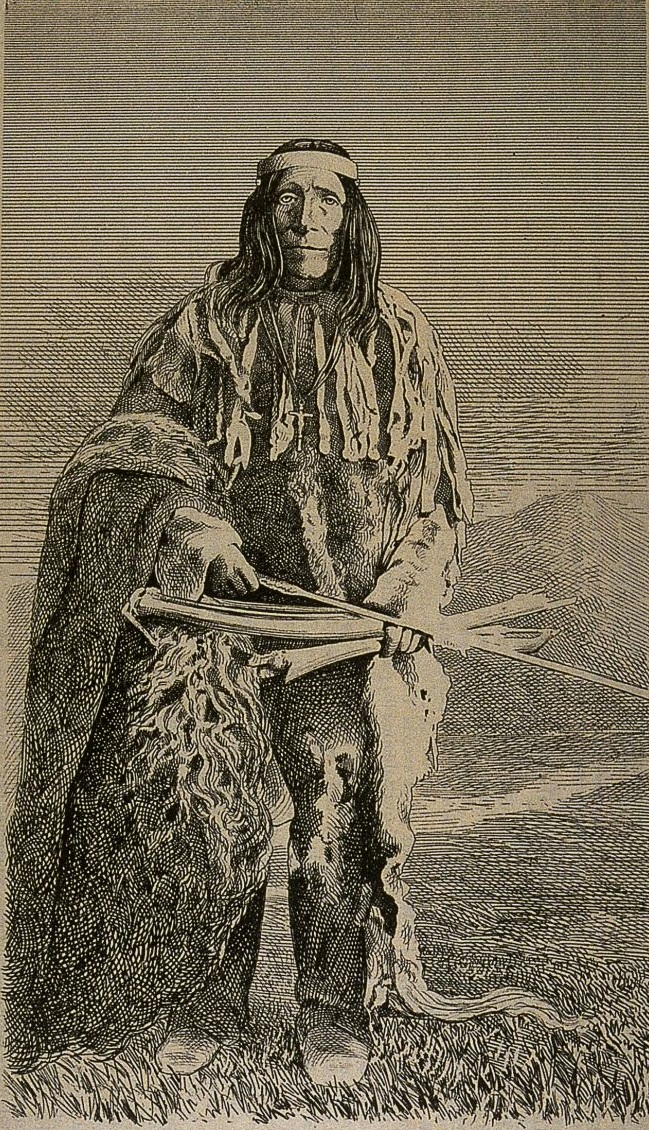
- Wikaskokiséyin
- Born: c. 1815
- Died: on or shortly before January 11, 1877 near Brosseau, Alberta, Canada

Sweet Grass (also Sweetgrass or wîhkasko-kisêyin) (c. 1815 – on or shortly before January 11, 1877) was a chief of the Cree in the 1860s and 1870s in western Canada. He worked with other chiefs and bands to participate in raids with enemy tribes. While a chief, Sweet Grass noticed the starvation and economic hardship the Cree were facing. This propelled him to work with the Canadian authorities and eventually sign Treaty 6. Sweet Grass believed that working alongside the government was one of the only solutions to the daily hardship the Cree were faced with. The Sweet Grass Reserve west of Battleford, Saskatchewan was named in his honor and is still functioning today.

== Life ==
=== Early life ===
Sweet Grass or wîhkasko-kisêyin was born in a Cree Camp in the area near Fort Pitt, Saskatchewan. The exact date and place of his birth is unrecorded. His mother was kidnapped during a war with the Cree from a tribe, which was located around Missouri. Due to this, Sweet Grass was not Cree and was Crow. There is no record of his father. Sweet Grass was born with the name Okimasis (okimâsis), which has been translated as He-who-has-no-name, but more accurately as Little Chief, which was related to his small size. Warriors consistently taunted him due to his stature within the village. His name, “Sweet Grass” was inspired by an audacious feat that he attempted as a youth. He ventured into the Blackfoot territory, completely alone with the goal of capturing a herd of horses. Approaching the pasture, he hid in a bush and as a man advanced towards him, he took out his bow, killed and scalped him; proceeding to raid the pasture to return forty horses to his tribe. His tribe was presented with a collection of grass dipped in the blood of the man he had killed. This was met with chants of “Sweet Grass”, which would eventually become his name as a Chief in 1870. Later that year, Sweet Grass was converted to Roman Catholicism by Father Albert Lacombe and was baptized with the Christian name Abraham.

=== Cree Childhood ===
Due to the fact that Sweet Grass' Mother was captured by a Cree tribe, it is unknown if she partook in the established birthing and naming traditions. However, the Cree had a process to which they named their children. The father of the child would ask Cree Shamans with spiritual powers to help with the naming process. The Shaman's decision would be based on a character or incident that they saw in their vision. Once a name was decided, the child was passed around the group where each individual blessed the child. This ceremony generally took place when the child reached the age of one. From this moment on, a special bond was formed between the child and whoever named them. There is no record of whether Sweet Grass and his mother took part in this ceremony. However, this likely happened because he was born in a Cree Camp. Children typically lived a carefree and adventurous childhood. Children did not wear much clothing and boys wore nothing until the age of five. Children did not spend much time with their parents growing up, rather with their grandparents. Sweet Grass’ childhood most likely went against this Cree norm because of his Mother's capture. Young men would attach themselves to a hunter or warrior that they admired and followed or shadowed them in performing tasks. Sweet Grass most likely did not partake in this tradition or many other childhood ones. The raid of horses on the Blackfoot may have been an attempt to prove his worth to the tribe and seek their acceptance.

=== The Cree ===
The Cree were located in the plains of Canada. The Cree are divided into several different tribes in Saskatchewan and Alberta. The name Cree represents a general ethnic group, however, there are several different tribes based on region and dialect. When Sweet Grass was chief, the different bands of the Cree were loose in a wide-ranging areas and usually named for the territory in which they operated It was not uncommon for different bands to hunt and perform rituals together as seen with Sweet Grass’ relationship with Big Bear. Families had the ability to break away from their current band and join another elsewhere. Cree societies were split into different roles, such as the Chief, which was the title Sweet Grass held. There were also village elders and warriors. There typically was a large number of warriors within a band and these men held extremely high prestige.

Cree religion believed in a single powerful creator which they based their ideology and ceremonies on. This figure held no real identity and did not appear to anyone in visions or contact. However, this almighty creator appeared to individuals through various sprits such as the bear and horse. Sweet Grass’ spiritual helper was the mosquito, which he would often seek for guidance. He believed that the insect had taken pity on him which guided him to become a chief. The Cree believe that the creator spirit was in every living thing around them. An individual acquired a spiritual helper after they appeared to them in a vision. This spirit did not provide aid or direct help in any way but instead provided guidance. The Cree believe that every individual has a soul which is located at the back of their neck. The soul was able to leave the body during visions where it would accompany their spiritual helper. After death, the soul would wonder the earth for four days, and then would travel to the land of the dead, which was believed to be in the Milky Way.

=== Position as Chief ===
The position of chief within the Cree varied from tribe to tribe and each had varying levels of authority over the band. Chiefs within Cree society were chosen by the consent of the band. While it sometimes would go to the eldest son of the previous chief, an incompetent man would not be given the position. A chief needed to be an active leader both in peace and war. It was required to distinguish themselves during a war, as a provider, and as a generous giver to gain this position. The most vital contributions of a chief was to keep the peace during the day to day living by settling arguments between the other members of the band. Sweet Grass understood the sacrifices that needed to be made for the bettering of the band. During one hunt Sweetgrass's horse was unable to remain calm, which was affecting the hunting of buffalo. Despite it being a highly valuable horse Sweetgrass traded it for an inferior one, understanding the importance of the group over the individual. It was not uncommon for there to be more than one chief who would have various levels of prestige. The amount of power wielded by Cree chiefs varied from person to person. Sweet Grass during the signing of the treaty was one of the most well-regarded plains Cree chiefs and was given a position of importance during negotiations.

=== Relationship with Big Bear ===
Sweet Grass often worked closely with the fellow Cree chief Big Bear. They hunted in the same territory and would often hunt and camp together. Sweet Grass was ten years older, so Big Bear recognized him as the superior chief. They bonded over sharing the characteristic of being small, but mighty warriors. Moreover, Big Bear was part Ojibwa which meant both chiefs were not completely Cree. Big Bear admired Sweet Grass for his bravery and guidance that he would often receive from his spiritual helper. Both Chiefs would work together in multiple raids on the Blackfoot. An example of this would be when Sweet Grass and Big Bear assembled 18 Cree warriors that attempted to raid Blackfoot hunting territory. After being forced to set up camp along a river due to a snow storm, a member of their war party left to collect food and spotted a lone member of the Blackfoot on foot rounding up horses. Upon reporting his sighting back to the others, they decide to kill the man and steal his horses. The attempted raid went wrong as Sweet Grass and Big Bear nearly stumbled upon Blackfoot main camp. Days of fighting ensued however, both chiefs managed to survive.

=== Buffalo Hunting and Fur Trade ===
Buffalo hunting and fur trading were a vital part of Cree survival. Cree Tribes would move according to their migration habits. At the beginning of 1870, buffalo were plentiful within the plains. In 1870, there were hundreds of thousands, which provided an immense amount of resources for the Cree to a point where they were able to only take the choice parts of the Buffalo. However, as European settlers came to the plains, that number dwindled significantly. In 1881, there was only a couple hundred Buffalo left within the plains. The Cree relied on the buffalo so heavily that they were pushed to a point of starvation. Additionally, as the Hudson's Bay Company moved into the prairies, the fur trade offered an extremely important source of income and goods for the Cree. However, over-trapping forced tribes to move west to find suitable forest areas. The lack of trapping territory, along with the decline of the buffalo left the Cree helpless. Both of these issues became an extremely important topic discussed in treaty negotiations which Sweet Grass was heavily involved in.

=== Cree Religious Conversion ===
Different tribes of the Cree held their own stories and traditions passed down orally through the generations. As Europeans began to set up colonies in North America, missionaries went among the indigenous people to spread their religion. While traditions within tribes remained significant, the Cree became more receptive to different denominations of Christianity. In 1852 the priest Father Lacombe moved to the Red River Colony with plans to live with the Metis and Cree. His goal was to spread the Roman Catholic faith to the Western parts of Canada. During this time Lacombe would become familiar with the Cree language and the culture, even writing a Cree dictionary in 1874. During the 1860s he moved farther west and would come into contact with Sweet Grass and his band. With diseases and famine rampant in the Cree community, they were more receptive to new religious ideas. It was due to both Lacombe's understanding of Cree culture and the growing desperation of the Cree, he would be able to convert many of the Cree to the Roman Catholic faith. Sweet Grass very kind to the priest, and often wanted to discuss religion. In 1870 Sweetgrass allowed himself to be baptized and was given the name Abraham.

== Relationship with Canadian Government ==
Throughout the 19th century, it appeared as though the federal government of Canada, situated in Ottawa, worked very hard to increase the dependency that aboriginal people had on it. The government wanted tribes to become more democratic in its governing of the reserves and rely less on the chiefs who traditionally were the leaders of the community. Naturally, this angered many indigenous communities who were more inclined to fight back than work with the government. Sweet Grass was one of the Chiefs who was more willing to work with them. One of the requests that Sweet Grass made to the government was to teach the Cree better farming techniques. Another was that the government should stop supplying weapons to the Blackfeet who were his tribe's enemy. These were just a few of the aspects that Sweet Grass worked with the government on. The overall goal that Sweet Grass wanted to achieve was an end to factionalism that had been plaguing the Plains Cree for years. Sweet Grass’ hope to work with the federal government was challenged by other prominent Cree leaders.

At the time when Sweet Grass was Chief, The Canadian government had pictured what the Indigenous communities were and never changed them. This type of thinking immediately damaged Indigenous communities as they were self-governing cultures that evolved much like any other. Sweet Grass along with three other Chiefs attempted to get ahead of government control by meeting with the representative of the Canadian government in the west Lieutenant Governor Archibald to petition the Hudson's Bay Company's (HBC) sale of land to the government. This land was not the HBC's to sell which is a problem that would occur several times to indigenous groups all over Canada. They also wanted the government to be held accountable for the depleted food supplies within the indigenous territories. Sweet Grass had also requested that the government provide supplies as needed so that they may sustain themselves when traditional hunting was not an option. whoever was responsible for conveying these concerns did not do so effectively as many of the requests were not met, at least not when they needed it most.

=== Treaty 6 ===
Treaty 6 was the biggest piece of legislation between Plains Cree Leaders and the colonial government. Signed in 1876, Treaty 6 was the agreement between the government of Canada and the Indigenous people living in parts of modern-day Saskatchewan and Alberta. Sweet Grass’ beliefs clashed with that of Big Bear who believed that a Confederacy needed to be formed as a united front in order to get the best terms for all. To be fair to Big Bear, he was mindful of what the government promised as he was not invited to the original negotiation and signing of Treaty 6. What Treaty 6 did deliver was more division and segregation between European settlers and Indigenous people. Indigenous people were forced to choose between living on reserves, receiving a fixed amount of money every year for the rest of their lives and trying to assimilate and lose their status. The language used to refer to indigenous people who elected to not settle on reserves also did not help ease tensions. The specific word used was “stragglers” which gave the impression that the government did not see these people as any more than falling behind in Canada's idealized picture of what life of Indigenous people would be. The unpreparedness or perhaps unwillingness of the Canadian government to deal with the problems of indigenous peoples continued long after the signing of Treaty 6 but it was Sweet Grass’ firm belief that this was the best way to ensure that indigenous culture survived.

== Tribal Conflict ==
The signing of Treaty 6 was not the only reason for conflict between the Cree and other prominent Indigenous tribes in the region. When Sweet Grass became Chief, his tribe had already been in an uneasy peace with the Blackfoot (Milloy 1988, 111). Sweet Grass had endeavored to maintain this peace even though many of his people resented it. As stated previously, part of what the Cree wanted to be reflected by the terms of Treaty 6 was an end to the factionalism that had pitted the younger members of the Cree community against the older Indigenous Leadership. The result of this factionalism was the revival of conflict between Sweet Grass's tribe and the Blackfeet. The peak of the conflict came in 1861 when the Blackfoot had threatened to kill any Cree, Metis, or white man whom they stumbled upon. Whenever a Cree war party was formed to go hunting in Blackfoot territory, caution had to be exercised, especially after the threat had been established. Sweet Grass and Big Bear had formed a war party for this exact purpose as stated previously. Sweet Grass himself killed a Blackfoot Chief who had been using a hollow tree as a shield by shooting through it and piercing his heart. Although it is not impossible, it is highly unlikely that the Cree escaped from their entrapment with as few casualties as they claimed.

The Plains Cree were not always the victims of this conflict. In 1860, a member of the Plains Cree had killed a Blackfoot chief, which had sparked a war against them. Although it is not known which of the Cree Chiefs supported an unexpected attack on a Blackfoot Chief, it is known that Sweet Grass was not among them. They had sent a war party to a Blackfoot camp and killed 18 Blackfeet in addition to stealing horses. Some of the Plains Cree simply could not accept peace with the Blackfoot. In another instance, Sweet Grass had invited the Blackfoot into his camp in an attempt to begin a long-standing peace with them. The result of this was more hostility from his people who had harassed Sweet Grass's Blackfoot guests. In 1862, Sweet Grass accompanied Broken Arm, who was known for his ability to broker peace, along with fifty escorts to finally make peace with the Blackfoot. As history has demonstrated, peace between the Blackfoot and the Plains Cree does not last very long. Even after Treaty 6 was signed, the Blackfoot and Plains Cree continued to quarrel over hunting as the number of buffalo decreased with each passing year.

== Death ==
On January 11, 1877, Sweet Grass had an argument with his brother after the signing of Treaty 6. His brother believed that they had given too much to the government in the treaty. He attempted to take Sweet Grass's pistol and it accidentally discharged, resulting in his death.

== Legacy ==
Sweet Grass, through both policy and action, had a lasting impact on the Plains Cree. As a well respected Cree leader during a time of strife, Sweet Grass attempted to lead his people as best as he could. By 1870, chief Sweet Grass would begin to become more integrated into Canadian society. Due to missionaries moving into the interior, there was more significant pressure to convert to European religions, which many Cree did. Sweet Grass himself converted to Catholicism in 1870, following a general shift of Cree towards Christianity. With encroaching settlers and other indigenous groups, the dwindling of traditional hunting, and disease rampant, Sweet Grass and his band of Cree were desperate for support. When Treaty 6 was put forward by the Canadian government in 1876, Sweetgrass was profoundly influential in bringing the Plains Cree into the agreement. This would be Sweetgrass's last significant influence on his people, as he would die shortly after signing the Treaty. While the signing of the treaty can be seen as selling away indigenous rights, it did bring much-needed medication and food to the Cree who had insufficient options.

=== Treaty 6 Impacts ===
==== Short-term Effects ====
The impact of the signing of the treaty had a significant effect on Cree life for both those who signed the treaty and those who did not. Those who did began to move onto the reserve land and being affected by the agreements made in the treaty. Not all Plains Cree would sign the treaty at first, and many would become disillusioned after signing. Big Bear resisted signing of the treaty, hoping that he could hold out for a better deal with the Canadian government. The Canadian government could hold out for longer than any of the Cree groups who were slowly dying from starvation and disease. Even though Big Bear publicly and consistently spoke against sighing treaties, by 1882 starving, he would sign Treaty 6. After signing the treaty, some of the Cree remained unsatisfied with the situation they had been forced into. Using this discontent, Chief Wandering Spirit gathered support and began to purses more aggressive policies towards settlers. When the Metis under Louis Riel started the Northwest-Rebellion in 1885, Wandering Spirit would lead a group of Cree to raid the Frog Lake Settlement. The primary goal of the raid was to get supplies, but it after some pushback from the settlers it quickly became violent. The group would then move to capture Fort Pit. The fort was heavily stocked with provisions, which angered the starving Cree. After the raid, they moved back to the reserve with the captured supplies without another incident. The perpetrators of the massacre would be apprehended and tried for murder and hung in 1885.

==== Debate of the Treaty ====
The legacy of Treaty 6 continues to affect the Cree till the modern day. Issues arise from the mixed interpretations of the Treaty by both the Indigenous groups and the Government. As this agreement is the first legal agreement between these Indigenous groups and the new Canadian government, which continued to impact and facilitate interactions between them. This has led to conflict over the clauses of the agreement. The disagreement on Treaty 6 stems from three major issues; language barriers, verbal agreements made during the negotiation, and the rights for chiefs to sign the agreement. In Cree cultural the chiefs do not always hold the legal right to make choices for the entire band. As the treaty process never included women in the discussion it ignored an important cultural pressure. Many of the Cree who participated in the treaty were unable to understand legal English. While there was a Cree verbal translation, the Treaty was made in English. The next biggest problem comes from a lack of follow through on verbal agreements. To the Canadian delegation, the only legally binding contracts were what was written into the treaty. In Cree culture, verbal agreements hold the same amount weight as any other agreements. Those who signed Treaty Six argue that understanding the treaty can only be understood when put into a context of the discussions that occurred during the treaty-making process. The meaning of land and the surrender of it was not entirely understood by those who were signing the agreement. There was limited understanding on the level of Canadian settlement that was going to happen, and limited knowledge on how indigenous people would be restricted from the land.

=== Sweet Grass's Band ===
When Sweet Grass died in 1877 his son was left to hold together the Band who followed his father. Under the leadership of Young Sweet Grass, the band began to fall apart due to internal conflict. At this point, Young Sweet Grass would lead a fragment of the band to join with other Cree, who had signed Treaty 6. Young Sweet Grass eventually became chief and named the new group the Sweetgrass First Nation in honour of his father. The Sweetgrass Nation was settled into the land West of the township of Battleford, Saskatchewan in 1884. From here the group made income from farming and lumber sale, supplemented with traditional methods as much as possible. In the years after settlement, the Sweetgrass Reserve would continue to be affected by famine and disease. Many people would leave the reserve due to government policies to limit food rations. This would lead high mortality rates within the community. On the Sweetgrass reserve, the mortality rates would grow after 1885 to 185 per every 1000 people on the reserve. The tactic of withholding food from reserves will be used by the Canadian government to force cooperation. After resisting sending children into the Canadian school system, the Cree living on the reserve received no food rations, until they capitulated. In 2010 the Sweetgrass Nation had over 1500 registered members who primarily live outside of the Sweetgrass Reserve.
