= Luke Gilliam =

English music engineer (born 1976)

Luke Gilliam is an artist, musician, producer, sound engineer and music promoter. He was born in Bath, UK, on 30 April 1976 but has spent much of his life in North America. He is the grandson of BBC radio producer Laurence Gilliam, OBE.

== Musical career ==
Gilliam completed his diploma in Audio Engineering in 1998, at Trebas Institute, Toronto, Ontario, Canada. The same year, he went on to work as an Assistant Sound Engineer on the Kevin Smith film Dogma.

In 2006 he produced and appeared as a percussionist on a jazz album entitled New Day Volume 1 by Trio Résistances. He also directed a compilation CD for Sundance Records named Beneath The Moon, released in 2005.

He’s worked as recording engineer and executive producer with a variety of other jazz musicians such as Quinsin Nachoff, Arthur Blythe, Dave Ellis, Adam Daudrich, John Oswald, Bruno Tocanne, Lionel Martin, and Benoît Keller.

Gilliam created the website RagPromotions to promote improvised and contemporary music in various cities across Canada and Europe.

== Artistic career ==
Gilliam has featured at a wide range of exhibition centres since 1994, at various locations in the UK, Canada and France. These include Gallery Arcturus (Toronto, 2009), British Art Academy (Bath, 2009), and Autre Cote Du Pont (Lyon, 2006). A number of his works also appeared in the short film Ulysses on the Love Canal, shown at the Nuit Blanche event in Toronto in 2007.

He’s worked with a variety of other artists including Michael Snow, Quinsin Nachoff, Arthur Blythe, Adam Daudrich, Mathew Eggleston, and Arnold Wytenberg.

He has also worked as a guest curator at the British Art Academy in Bath, UK.

Current affairs have occasionally appeared as influences in Gilliam’s work. In 2009, Gilliam created prints as part of a project protesting against the arrest of Iran’s Leyla Farzadi. The project was inspired by Amnesty International and also involved Gilliam writing to Ayatollah Shahroudi.
