= Bluenose Lake =

Lake in Nunavut, Canada

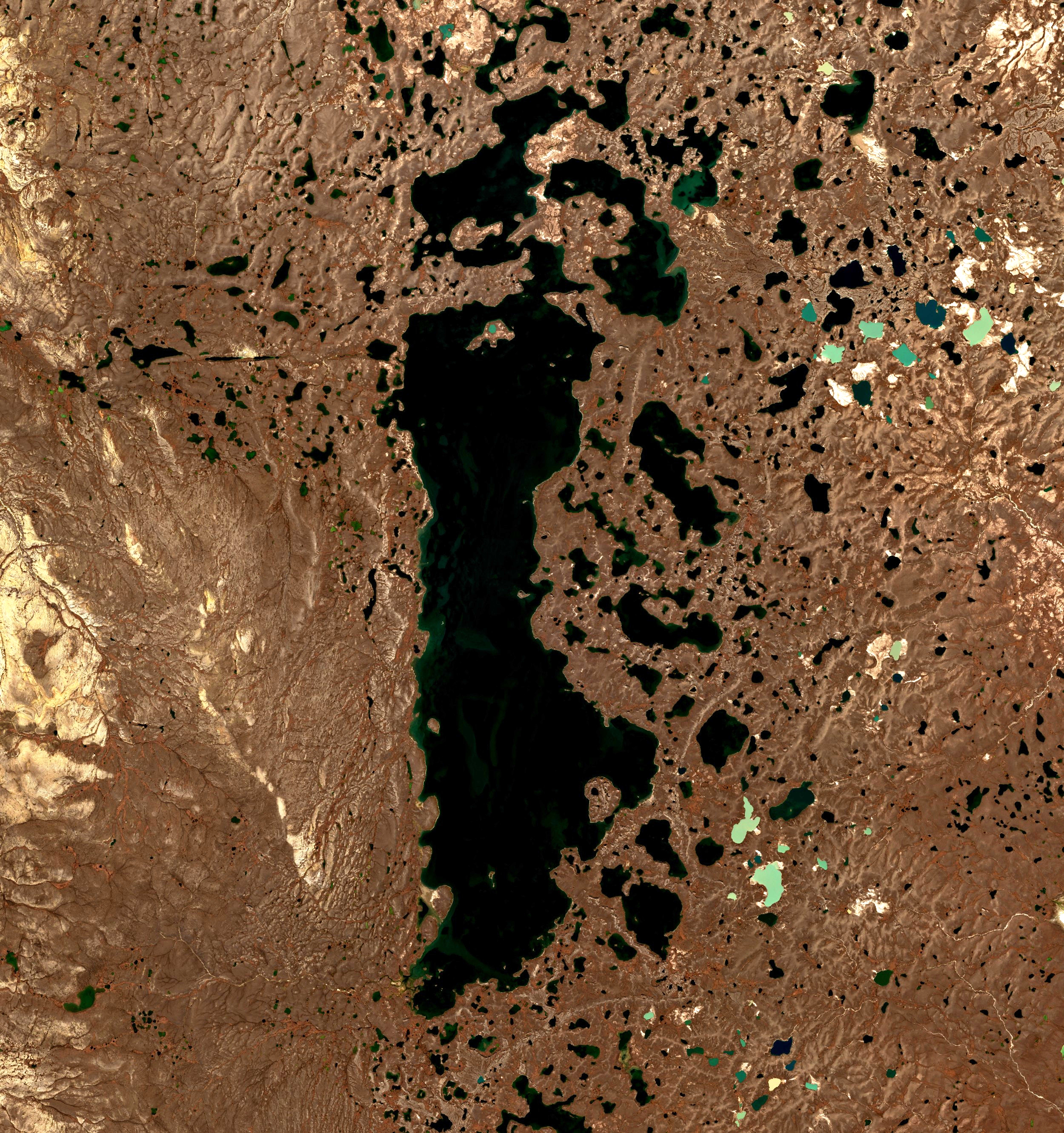
- Sentinel-2 image (2019)

- Location in Nunavut
- Location: Kitikmeot, Nunavut
- Coordinates: 68°26′N 119°45′W
- Primary outflows: Croker River
- Basin countries: Canada
- Max. length: 33 mi (53 km)
- Max. width: 12 mi (19 km)
- Surface area: 155 mi^{2} (400 km^{2})
- Surface elevation: 1,800 ft (550 m)
- Settlements: uninhabited

Bluenose Lake is a lake in Kitikmeot Region, Nunavut, Canada. It is located north of the Arctic Circle within the large, shallow basin of the Melville Hills. It is approximately 33 mi (53 km) long, 12 mi (19 km) wide, and is situated at 1,800 ft (550 m) above sea level. The Croker River flows north from Bluenose Lake to the Arctic Ocean, entering at Dolphin and Union Strait.

It was officially named in 1953 by John Kelsall and James Mitchell subsequent to their biological investigation of the previously unnamed lake.

== Fauna ==
The area barren-ground caribou are divided, genetically, into two herds, Bluenose-east and Bluenose-west. Other mammals include Arctic fox, Arctic ground squirrel, Arctic hare, Back's lemming, barren-ground grizzly bear, collared lemming, muskox, short-tailed weasel, tundra vole, and wolf.

Birds that frequent the area include Arctic loon, Arctic tern, Baird's sandpiper, black-bellied plover, buff-breasted sandpiper, Canada goose, glaucous gull, golden eagle, golden plover, herring gull, king eider, Lapland longspur, long-tailed jaeger, mallard, northern phalarope, oldsquaw, parasitic jaeger, pectoral sandpiper, pintail, raven, red-breasted merganser, red-throated loon, rough-legged hawk, sanderling, semipalmated sandpiper, short-eared owl, snow bunting, snowy owl, tree sparrow, water pipit, whistling swan, willow ptarmigan, and yellow-billed loon.
