= Émile Petitot =

Father Émile Petitot
- Born: Émile-Fortuné-Stanislas-Joseph Petitot; December 3, 1838; Grancey-le-Château-Neuvelle, France
- Died: May 13, 1916 (aged 77); Mareuil-lès-Meaux, France
- Other names: Émile-Fortuné-Stanislas-Joseph Petitot; Mitchi Pitchitork Tchikraynarm iyoyé
- Education: Collège du Sacré-Cœur in Grancey; Notre-Dame-de-l'Osier
- Occupations: Roman Catholic priest; cartographer; ethnologist; geographer; linguist; writer
- Known for: First European to reach the Tuktut Nogait National Park area
- Awards: Silver medal, Société de Géographie; 1883, Back Prize, Royal Geographical Society

Émile-Fortuné Petitot (Inuk name, Mitchi Pitchitork Tchikraynarm iyoyé, meaning "Mr. Petitot, son of the Sun"; December 3, 1838 – May 13, 1916) was a French Missionary Oblate who worked in the Canadian northwest as a cartographer, ethnologist, geographer, linguist, and writer. Returning to France later in life, he served as a parish priest and wrote of Northern Canada.

== Early life and education ==
Émile-Fortuné-Stanislas-Joseph Petitot was born in Grancey-le-Château-Neuvelle, France. His father, Jean-Baptiste Petitot, was a clockmaker; his mother was Thérèse-Julie-Fortunée Gagneur. Petitot attended the minor seminary and the Collège du Sacré-Cœur in Grancey. In 1859, he took minor orders of the priesthood before joining the Oblates in September 1860. His training occurred at Notre-Dame-de-l'Osier, and on March 15, 1862, he was ordained in Marseille.

== Career ==
Fourteen days after his ordination, he left for Canada's Mackenzie River. The young missionary Petitot traveled with Bishop Alexandre-Antonin Taché from Marseille via Liverpool (where they were joined by another two Oblates, Constantine Scollen and John Duffy) and Montreal to St Boniface (Winnipeg) arriving there on 26 May 1862. He left St. Boniface with the Portage La Loche Brigade June 8 arriving at the Methye Portage on July 20. By August 1862, he had traveled to Great Slave Lake in Canada's Northwest Territories with the Hudson's Bay Brigade Trail.

Petitot was based at Northwest Territories' missions for 12 years, including Fort Norman, Fort Providence, Fort Resolution, and Fort Good Hope. Here he collected material for his dictionary of several Athabascan languages. He also collected extensive legends of the Blackfoot, Chipewyan, Cree, Dogrib, Hare, and Loucheux cultures.

From 1864 through 1878, he worked on the design, decoration, and construction of the Church of Our Lady of Good Hope, designated a National Historic Site of Canada.

The late 1860s were troublesome years. In 1866, he was temporarily excommunicated, and in 1868, he developed short bouts of insanity. But in the midst of this, in 1867–68, Petitot became the first European to reach the Tuktut Nogait National Park area.

Petitot returned to France in 1874 and published his dictionaries and other works. The following year, in 1875, he spoke at the inaugural International Congress of Americanists in Nancy, France making a strong case for the Asiatic origin of Inuit and North American Indians. He was awarded a silver medal by the Société de Géographie for his Arctic maps, including the partially traveled Hornaday River, though he referred to it as Rivière La Roncière-le Noury, named in honor of the president of the Société de Géographie.

After two years in France, Petitot returned to the North, mostly helping and studying the people of the Great Slave Lake area. In late 1881, at Fort Pitt (Sask) he "married" Margarite (Margarita) Valette, a mature Metis woman. In January 1882 he was forcibly taken east by Constantine Scollen, an Oblate who had traveled with him and Bishop Tache, to Canada, in 1862. He entered an asylum near Montreal. By 1883, however, his ill health forced him to end his missionary work and return to France. Honoring his scientific contributions, he was awarded the 1883 Back Prize by the Royal Geographical Society.

He became a parish priest on October 1, 1886, at Mareuil-lès-Meaux, France. Here, he ministered to the sick, and published books and articles on Northern Canada.

== Death and legacy ==
He died in 1916.

- The Petitot River is named in his honor.
- Painted circa 1867, Petitot's painting of Fort Edmonton hangs in the Alberta Legislature's library.
- 1975, a plaque was placed by the Canadian Minister of Indian and Northern Affairs at Mareuil-lès-Meaux to commemorate Petitot's scientific contributions to Northern Canada.
- 1980, a copy of Petitot's works were donated to the Institute for Northern Studies, University of Saskatchewan.
- 2005, selections of Petitot's writings on his time in the Canadian North were edited and translated by John Moir, Jacqueline Moir and Paul Laverdue and published by the Champlain Society.

== Selected works ==
=== In English ===
- Moir, John; Moir, Jacqueline; Laverdue, Paul, eds. Travels Around Great Slave Lake and Great Bear Lakes, 1862-1882 The Champlain Society. Toronto: Champlain Society, 2005.

=== In French ===
- Vocabulaire Français-Esquimau OCLC 46291818
- Les Amérindiens du nord-ouest canadien du 19e siècle selon Emile Petitot préc. d'une prés. gén. des indiens dènè-dindjié (The Amerindians of the Canadian Northwest in the 19th century, as seen by Émile Petitot), OCLC 179804765
- Monographie de Dènè-Dindjié., OCLC 77347629
- De l'origine asiatique des Indiens de l'Amérique arctique,
- Petit vocabulaire sarcis, OCLC 35326154
- Mémoire abrégé sur la géographie de l'Athabaskaw-Mackenzie et des grands lacs du bassin arctique de l'Amérique, ISBN 0-665-04819-X
- (1874). Outils en pierre et en os du MacKenzie (cercle polaire arctique), OCLC 67291221
- (1876). Dictionnaire de la langue dènd̀indjié ; dialectes montagnais ou chippewayan, peaux de lièvre et loucheux renfermant en outre un grand nombre de termes propres a sept autres dialectes de la même langue; précédé d'une monographie des dènè-dindjié, d'une grammaire et de tableaux synoptiques des conjugaisons, OCLC 78851365
- (1884). De la formation du langage. Mots formés par le redoublement de racines hétérogènes, quoique de signification synonyme, c'est-a-dire par réitèration copulative, OCLC 67290388
- (1890). Accord des mythologies dans la cosmogonie des Danites arctiques, OCLC 253141763
- (1911). Dates importantes pour l'histoire de la découverte géographique de la puissance du Canada., OCLC 62929581

== Musical score ==
- (1889). Chants indiens du Canada Nord-Ouest, OCLC 47709084

== Filmography ==
- (2001). I, Emile Petitot — Arctic Explorer and Missionary, a Getaway Films documentary. A one-hour documentary produced by Tom Shandel (who also portrays Petitot in the documentary!).
