= Paulatuk =

Paulatuk Paulatuuq
- Hamlet
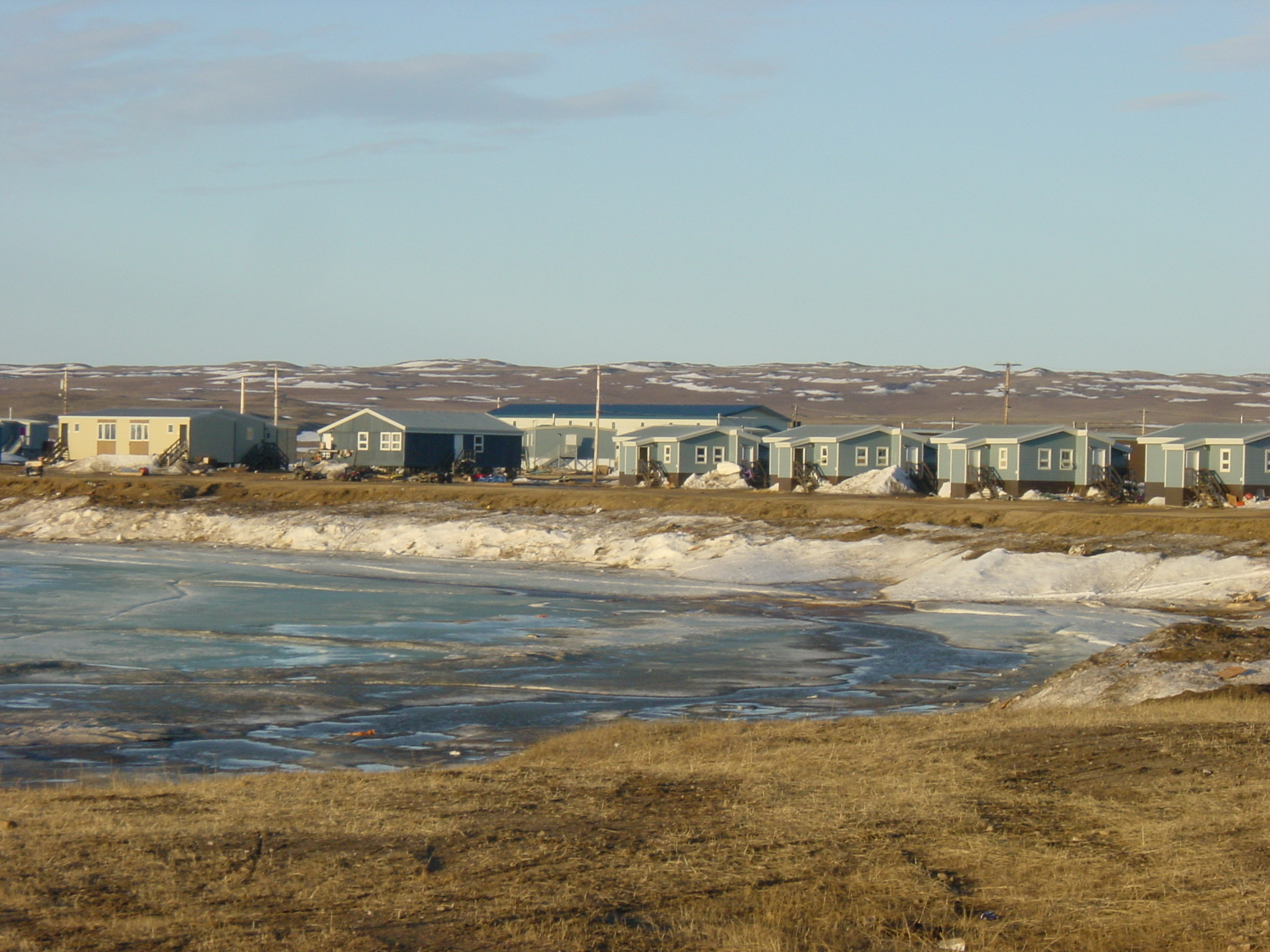
- The hamlet of Paulatuk in May

- Location within Northwest Territories Location within Canada
- Coordinates: 69°21′05″N 124°04′10″W
- Country: Canada
- Territory: Northwest Territories
- Region: Inuvik Region
- Constituency: Nunakput
- Census division: Region 1
- Incorporated (hamlet): 1 April 1987

Government
  - Mayor: Ray Ruben Sr.
  - Senior Administrative Officer: John Holland
  - MLA: Jackie Jacobson

Area
  - Land: 66.86 km^{2} (25.81 sq mi)
- Elevation: 5 m (16 ft)

Population (2021)
  - Total: 298
  - Density: 4/km^{2} (10/sq mi)
- Time zone: UTC−06:00 (Northwest Territories Time)
- Canadian Postal code: X0E 1N0
- Area code: 867
- Telephone exchange: 580
- Living cost: 177.5^{A}
- Food price index: 195.9^{B}
- Sources: Department of Municipal and Community Affairs, Prince of Wales Northern Heritage Centre, Canada Flight Supplement^A2009 figure based on Edmonton = 100^B2010 figure based on Yellowknife = 100

Paulatuk is a hamlet located in the Inuvik Region of the Northwest Territories, Canada. It is located adjacent to Darnley Bay, in the Amundsen Gulf, and 105 km (65 mi) east of the Smoking Hills. The town was named for the coal that was found in the area in the 1920s, and the Siglitun spelling is Paulatuuq, "place of coal".

== History ==
The area has been inhabited by humans, including the Thule and Copper Inuit, since roughly 1000 CE. Most recently, it is part of the Inuvialuit Settlement Region.

The hamlet dates back as early as the 1920s when several Inuit settled at this site on Darnley Bay, however the community only became permanently occupied following the opening of a trading post in 1935.

Paulatuk was incorporated as a hamlet in 1987 and celebrated the 50th anniversary of its settlement in 2015.

== Demographics ==
Federal census population history of Paulatuk
Year	Pop.	±%
1976	128	—
1981	174	+35.9%
1986	193	+10.9%
1991	255	+32.1%
1996	277	+8.6%
2001	286	+3.2%
2006	294	+2.8%
2011	313	+6.5%
2016	265	−15.3%
2021	298	+12.5%
Source: Statistics Canada

Annual population estimates

Year	Pop.	±%
1996	297	—
1997	296	−0.3%
1998	304	+2.7%
1999	300	−1.3%
2000	311	+3.7%
2001	320	+2.9%
2002	315	−1.6%
2003	326	+3.5%
2004	308	−5.5%
2005	306	−0.6%
2006	303	−1.0%

Year	Pop.	±%
2007	309	+2.0%
2008	306	−1.0%
2009	309	+1.0%
2010	323	+4.5%
2011	322	−0.3%
2012	314	−2.5%
2013	313	−0.3%
2014	308	−1.6%
2015	313	+1.6%
2016	312	−0.3%
2017	312	+0.0%

Sources: NWT Bureau of Statistics (2001 - 2017)

In the 2021 Canadian census conducted by Statistics Canada, Paulatuk had a population of 298 living in 81 of its 100 total private dwellings, a change of 12.5% from its 2016 population of 265. With a land area of 63.58 km^{2} (24.55 sq mi), it had a population density of 4.7/km^{2} (12.1/sq mi) in 2021.

In the 2016 census 235 people were listed as Indigenous and all were Inuit (Inuvialuit). The two principal languages spoken in Paulatuk are Inuinnaqtun (Inuvialuktun) and English.

== Community ==
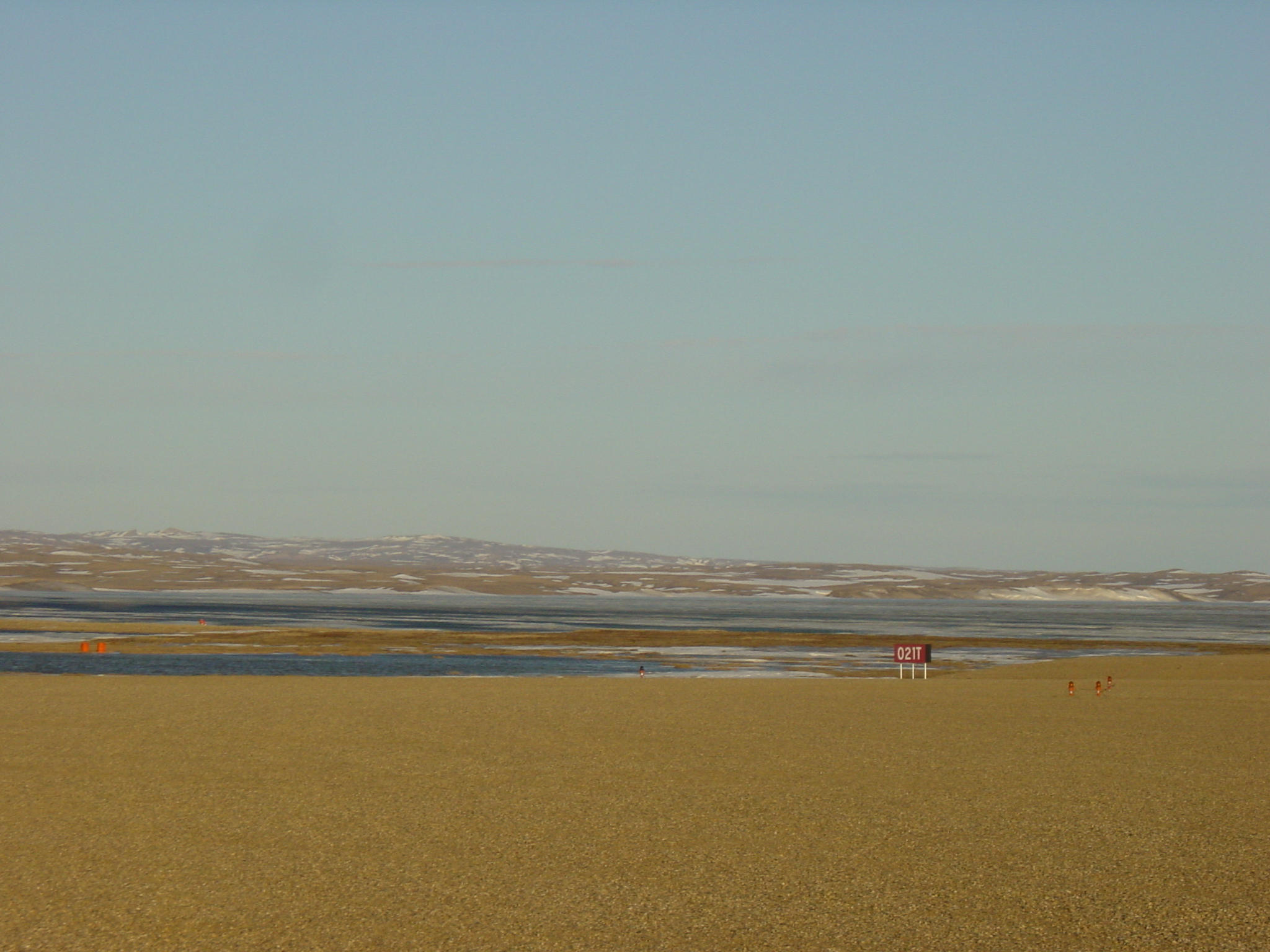
View down the Paulatuk Airport runway

European settlement began when the Roman Catholic Church opened a trading post. In the 1950s a Distant Early Warning Line site was built about 95 km (59 mi) to the northwest at Cape Parry, on the Parry Peninsula, providing a wage-based income for the community. The trading post was taken over by the local co-op and today the local store is part of The North West Company.

Hunting, fishing and trapping are major economic activities, but in recent years art printmaking has played an increasing role in the local economy.

The Smoking Hills which are about 105 km (65 mi) west on the shores of the Arctic Ocean are a scientifically interesting object, since they are diminishing the pH value of the water areas. So the buffer effect has completely disappeared. Located to the east of the community is Tuktut Nogait National Park and Parks Canada has an office in the community.

== Notable residents ==
=== Artists ===
Paulatuk's Inuit artists are known across Canada and around the world for dance, music, sculptures, prints, and drawings.

==== Floyd Kuptana ====
Floyd Kuptana was born in 1964. He studied under David Ruben Piqtoukun and began solo work in 1992. He is a carver, sculptor, and painter.

==== Robert Kuptana ====
Robert Kuptana was born in 1962. A carver since his youth, he studied under his brother Floyd and began professional work in 1998.

==== The Paulatuk Moonlight Dancers ====
The Paulatuk Moonlight Dancers are a group of traditional Inuvialuit dancers. They have performed in Canada, the United States, Greenland, and Germany, and are led by Michael “Nolan” Green. Green also served as a hamlet councillor and received a Canada Youth Award in 2002.

==== Abraham Anghik Ruben ====
Abraham Anghik Ruben was born south of Paulatuk in 1951 and lived on the land with his family until he was eight years old. He currently lives on Salt Spring Island.

His 2001 sculpture The Last Goodbye reflects Ruben and his brothers' experiences of being separated from their family by Canada's residential school system. Ruben writes,

I clearly remember when this took place—my mother sitting with my older brother and sister, David and Martha, just before they left for the Mission school in Aklavik. David was five years old at the time and Martha was only a little older. It was a scene that was repeated later on when my other brothers and I were sent off to residential school. But this time, it was sadder for my mother, because it would be three years that David and Martha would be gone. They left in 1955 and we didn’t see them again until the latter part of 1958. Those three years had a permanent impact on my brother’s life."

Ruben became an Officer in the Order of Canada on November 17, 2016 for his artistic contributions as a sculptor and for his preservation of northern heritage.

==== David Ruben Piqtoukun ====
David Ruben Piqtoukun was born in Paulatuk in 1950. A sculptor and print artist, he is also brother to Abraham Anghik Ruben and was a mentor to Floyd Kuptana.

=== Mayors ===
A mayor has led the hamlet since its incorporation in 1987, when the first mayor, Garrett Ruben, was elected. Ruben was also a community leader before incorporation. As a young man he worked near the Distant Early Warning (DEW) Line site at Cape Parry, but the area was isolated and far from traditional hunting grounds. After leaving this work, he negotiated for the community locally and in the south and became Settlement Chair prior to serving as mayor. Ruben died in 2007 at the age of 72. The hamlet has formally recognized him for his 24 years of service. Ray Ruben, the sixth and current mayor, is his son.

=== Other figures ===
==== Anny Illasiak ====
Paulatuk elder Anny Illasiak, also known as Granny Uma, died in 2012 at the age of 74. A resident of Paulatuk since the 1970s, Illasiak was a leader in training children and young people to live on the land. She also organized a community sewing group, teaching others to make traditional clothing and creating tapestries herself, and volunteered as a cook with the Paulatuk Community Kitchen. She served as the Aboriginal language teacher for the Paulatuk Aboriginal Headstart Program for 10 years and continued to assist with the program after her retirement.

==== Elizabeth Kuptana ====
Elizabeth "Liz" Kuptana, recipient of the Wallace Goose Award (given to those who have “shown beyond a shadow of a doubt, that he or she has unselfishly dedicated time, effort, and sometimes blood, sweat, and tears for the advancement and benefit of all Inuvialuit”) is a Paulatuk elder, teacher, and storyteller. She teaches children and youth about Inuvialuit culture and language as well as the history of the Inuvialuit Final Agreement. She was awarded the Queen Elizabeth II Diamond Jubilee Medal in 2013.

==== Paulatuuq Oral History Project ====
Paulatuuq Oral History Project: Elders Share Their Stories was published in 2004. Eight community elders, including Edward Ruben and Mary Evik Ruben, contributed to this record of the hamlet's oral history, completing interviews transcribed by Cathy Cockney.

== Services ==
Services include a two-member Royal Canadian Mounted Police detachment and a health centre with two nurses. Phone services are provided by Northwestel with Internet by SSI Micro and their AirWare service.

The community is part of the Beaufort Delta Divisional Education Council and schooling is available up to Grade 12 at the Angik School. There is also a community learning centre operated by Aurora College.

The community is not accessible by road but there is an airport, Paulatuk (Nora Aliqatchialuk Ruben) Airport, and flights into the community are provided by Aklak Air from Inuvik three times a week. In the summer floatplanes can use the Paulatuk Water Aerodrome and an annual sealift is provided by Northern Transportation Company Limited from Hay River.

== Climate ==
Paulatuk has a subarctic climate (Dfc), narrowly avoiding being a tundra climate (ET) due to July having an average temperature above 10 °C (50 °F). Rainfall is in limited amounts and confined to the months of June through September, the only months the average temperature remains above freezing.

Climate data for Paulatuk (Paulatuk (Nora Aliqatchialuk Ruben) Airport) WMO ID: 71984; coordinates 69°21′28″N 124°04′57″W; elevation: 6.3 m (21 ft); 1991–2020 normals, extremes 1985−present (Note: Includes composite data from Paulatuk A: Climate ID: 2203055; coordinates 69°21′38″N 124°04′33″W; elevation: 4.6 m (15 ft) and Paulatuk A: Climate ID: 2203057; coordinates 69°21′40″N 124°04′31″W; elevation: 4.6 m (15 ft))
Month	Jan	Feb	Mar	Apr	May	Jun	Jul	Aug	Sep	Oct	Nov	Dec	Year
Record high humidex	3.2	13.7	−0.3	10.4	21.8	30.1	33.6	31.7	23.4	14.9	6.6	1.9	33.6
Record high °C (°F)	4.0 (39.2)	−2.6 (27.3)	1.4 (34.5)	11.5 (52.7)	23.1 (73.6)	29.5 (85.1)	30.2 (86.4)	30.0 (86.0)	20.7 (69.3)	16.2 (61.2)	7.6 (45.7)	3.0 (37.4)	30.2 (86.4)
Mean daily maximum °C (°F)	−21.0 (−5.8)	−21.4 (−6.5)	−18.9 (−2.0)	−9.7 (14.5)	1.1 (34.0)	9.8 (49.6)	14.2 (57.6)	12.2 (54.0)	6.0 (42.8)	−2.7 (27.1)	−12.2 (10.0)	−18.8 (−1.8)	−5.1 (22.8)
Daily mean °C (°F)	−24.7 (−12.5)	−25.2 (−13.4)	−23.3 (−9.9)	−14.5 (5.9)	−2.8 (27.0)	5.6 (42.1)	10.3 (50.5)	9.0 (48.2)	3.5 (38.3)	−5.2 (22.6)	−15.6 (3.9)	−22.3 (−8.1)	−8.8 (16.2)
Mean daily minimum °C (°F)	−28.3 (−18.9)	−29.0 (−20.2)	−27.6 (−17.7)	−19.2 (−2.6)	−6.6 (20.1)	1.5 (34.7)	6.4 (43.5)	5.7 (42.3)	0.9 (33.6)	−7.6 (18.3)	−18.8 (−1.8)	−25.9 (−14.6)	−12.4 (9.7)
Record low °C (°F)	−42.0 (−43.6)	−44.1 (−47.4)	−47.4 (−53.3)	−36.8 (−34.2)	−28.7 (−19.7)	−6.2 (20.8)	−2.0 (28.4)	−3.2 (26.2)	−11.0 (12.2)	−34.1 (−29.4)	−37.5 (−35.5)	−42.6 (−44.7)	−47.4 (−53.3)
Record low wind chill	−55.5	−56.6	−59.6	−48.2	−35.6	−12.0	−6.6	−9.5	−20.0	−49.9	−48.6	−49.9	−59.6
Average precipitation mm (inches)	14.2 (0.56)	13.8 (0.54)	16.8 (0.66)	14.8 (0.58)	12.9 (0.51)	18.8 (0.74)	25.2 (0.99)	35.4 (1.39)	25.0 (0.98)	22.5 (0.89)	15.1 (0.59)	12.6 (0.50)	227.0 (8.94)
Average rainfall mm (inches)	0.0 (0.0)	0.0 (0.0)	0.0 (0.0)	0.2 (0.01)	3.7 (0.15)	16.1 (0.63)	26.4 (1.04)	—	—	1.6 (0.06)	0.1 (0.00)	0.0 (0.0)	—
Average snowfall cm (inches)	15.7 (6.2)	12.5 (4.9)	16.5 (6.5)	12.6 (5.0)	12.1 (4.8)	0.8 (0.3)	0.0 (0.0)	1.9 (0.7)	7.7 (3.0)	28.6 (11.3)	21.9 (8.6)	—	—
Average precipitation days (≥ 0.2 mm)	11.4	10.8	11.2	9.0	7.9	8.7	11.0	14.2	13.3	13.1	11.6	12.0	134
Average rainy days (≥ 0.2 mm)	0.0	0.0	0.0	0.06	1.7	7.0	11	—	—	0.93	0.1	0.0	—
Average snowy days (≥ 0.2 cm)	9.7	8.2	9.4	7.1	5.8	0.72	0.0	0.87	4.1	12.1	12.1	—	—
Average relative humidity (%) (at 1500 LST)	78.1	75.9	72.8	71.1	75.4	75.5	72.8	76.5	78.3	82.5	83.1	80.2	76.8
Source: Environment and Climate Change Canada

== See also ==
- List of municipalities in the Northwest Territories
