= Darnley Bay =

Bay in the Northwest Territories, Canada

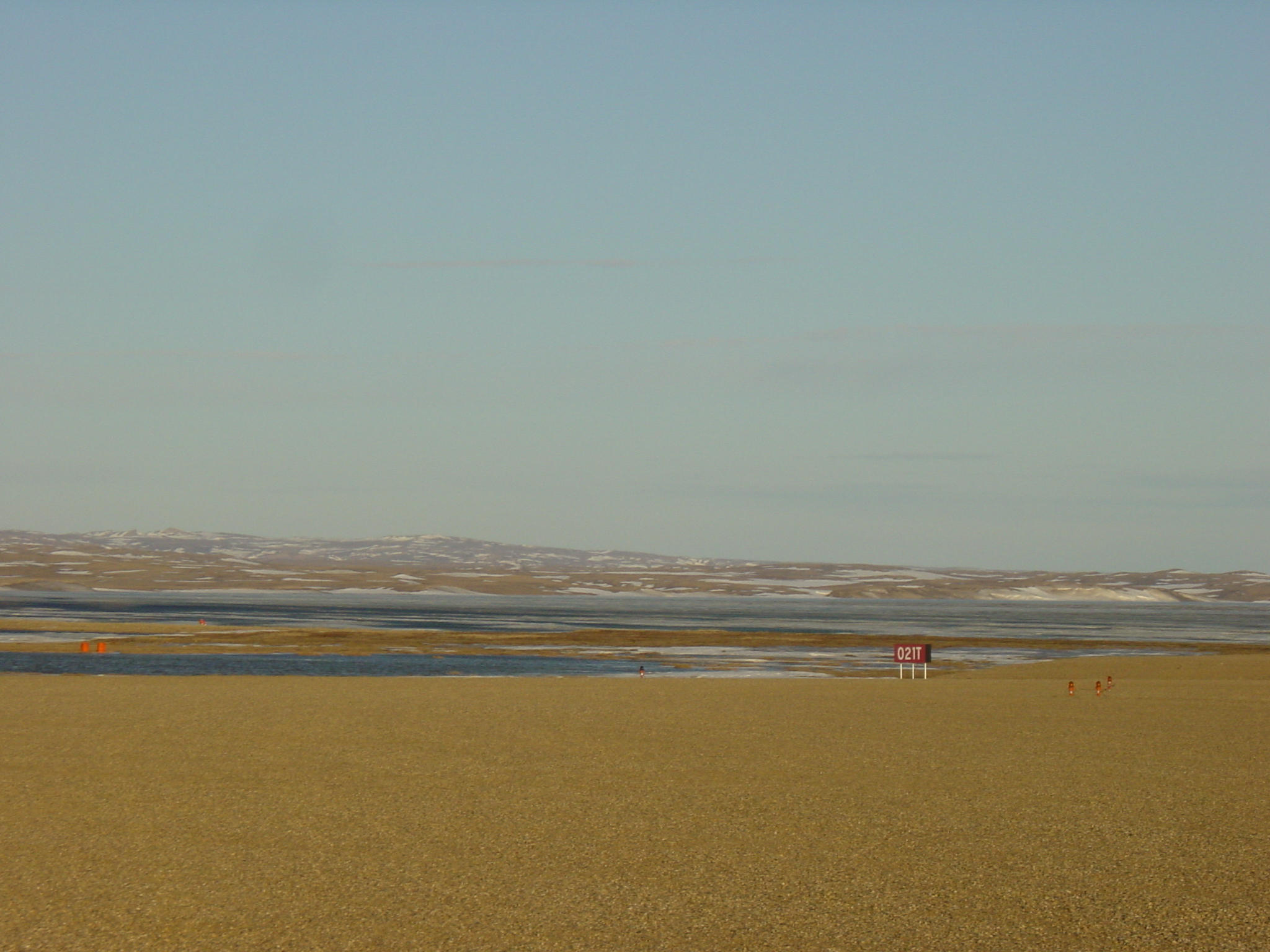
- Paulatuk airport, located next to the coast of Darnley Bay

- Location within Northwest Territories
- Location: Amundsen Gulf
- Coordinates: 69°35′01″N 123°40′08″W
- Ocean/sea sources: Arctic Ocean
- Basin countries: Canada
- Settlements: Uninhabited

Darnley Bay is a large inlet in the Northwest Territories, Canada. It is a southern arm of the Amundsen Gulf. The bay measures 45 km (28 mi) long, and 32 km (20 mi) wide at its mouth.

The Parry Peninsula is to the west and Halcro Point is to the east. The Canadian Shield originates east of Darnley Bay, the terrain sloping upwards, and characterized by glacial deposits.

The bay was named by John Richardson, while travelling with John Franklin during the Second Overland Expedition, for John Bligh, 4th Earl of Darnley.

In 1915, the Canadian Arctic Expedition of 1913-16 was the first to delineate the southern shore of Darnley Bay. The Hornaday River drains into the bay's southern shores, 14 km (8.7 mi) east of the Inuvialuit hamlet of Paulatuk.
