= Amundsen Gulf =

Gulf in the Northwest Territories, Canada

Coordinates: 71°00′01″N 124°00′10″W

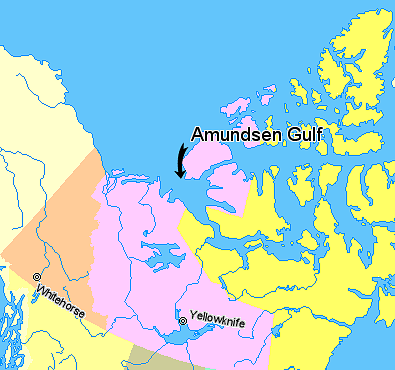
Amundsen Gulf, Northwest Territories, Canada. Nunavut Northwest Territories Yukon Territory British Columbia Alaska

The Amundsen Gulf is a gulf located mainly in the Inuvik Region, Northwest Territories, Canada with a small section in the Kitikmeot Region of Nunavut. It lies between Banks Island and Victoria Island and the mainland. It is approximately 250 mi (400 km) in length and about 93 mi (150 km) across where it meets the Beaufort Sea.

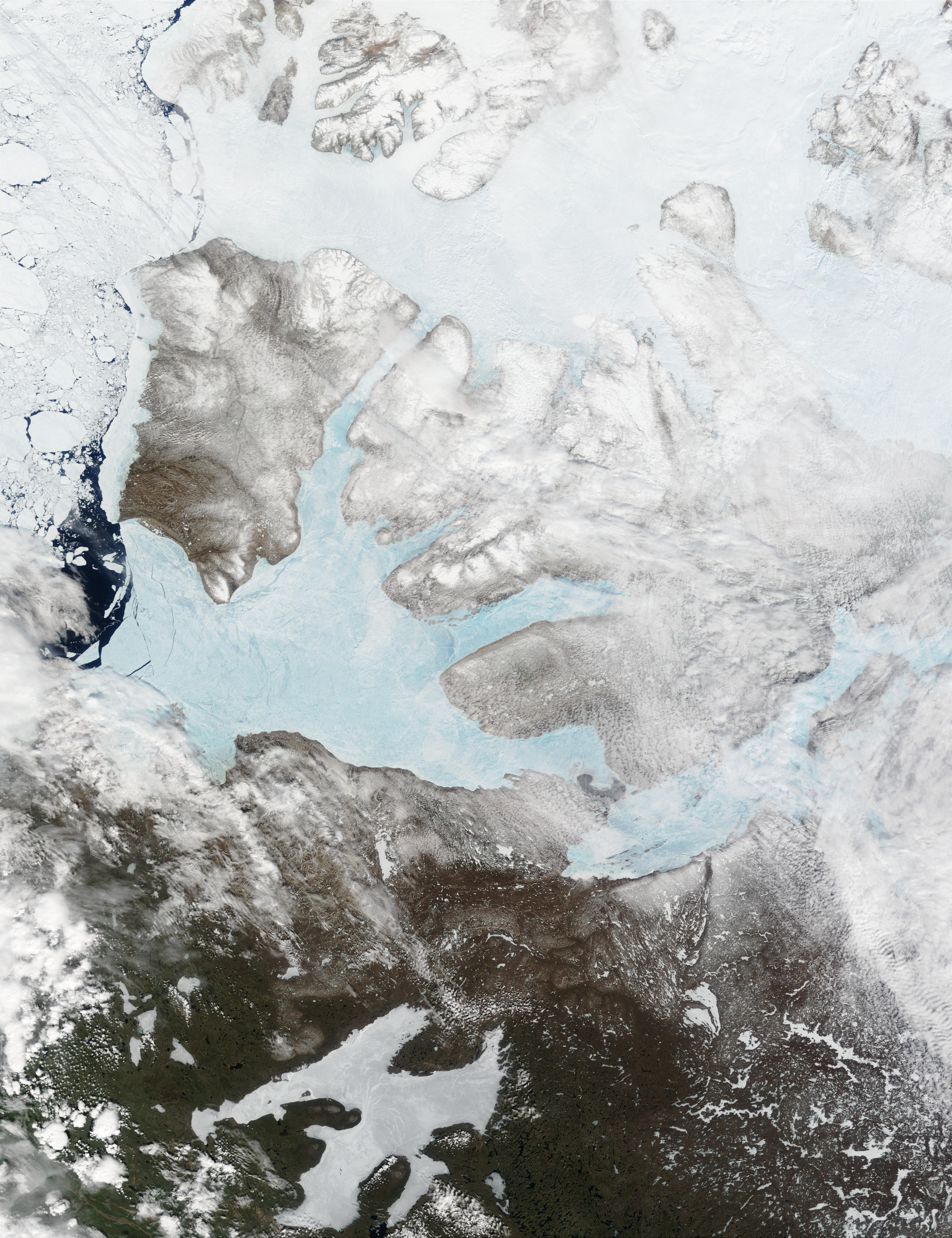
June 2002 satellite image of Amundsen Gulf, looking bright blue before thaw

The Amundsen Gulf was explored by Norwegian explorer Roald Amundsen between 1903 and 1906. The gulf is at the western end of the famous Northwest Passage, a route from the Atlantic Ocean to the Pacific.

Few people live along the shores of the gulf, but there are a few towns and communities, including Sachs Harbour, Ulukhaktok, and Paulatuk. Heading north in the gulf one would find the Prince of Wales Strait. Heading southeast and east, the gulf leads through the Dolphin and Union Strait, past Simpson Bay and into the Coronation Gulf. From there one would go through the Dease Strait and into the Queen Maud Gulf, and eventually head northeast into the Victoria Strait. Heading west and northwest a traveller would first enter the Beaufort Sea and then the Arctic Ocean. The entire gulf is in the Arctic tundra climate region, characterized by extremely cold winters. In late winter the Amundsen Gulf is covered in sea ice. Most of the ice breaks up in July during a normal year, with some areas in the far eastern and northern part of the gulf only breaking up in August.

Beluga whales, seals, Arctic char, cod, and even salmon use the waters of the gulf. Sockeye and pink salmon appeared for the first time in nearby waters between 1999 and 2001.

== See also ==
- De Salis Bay
- Storkerson Bay
