= Inuvialuit Settlement Region =

Inuvialuit Settlement Region Inuvialuit Nunangit Sannaiqtuaq (Inuinnaqtun)
- Region
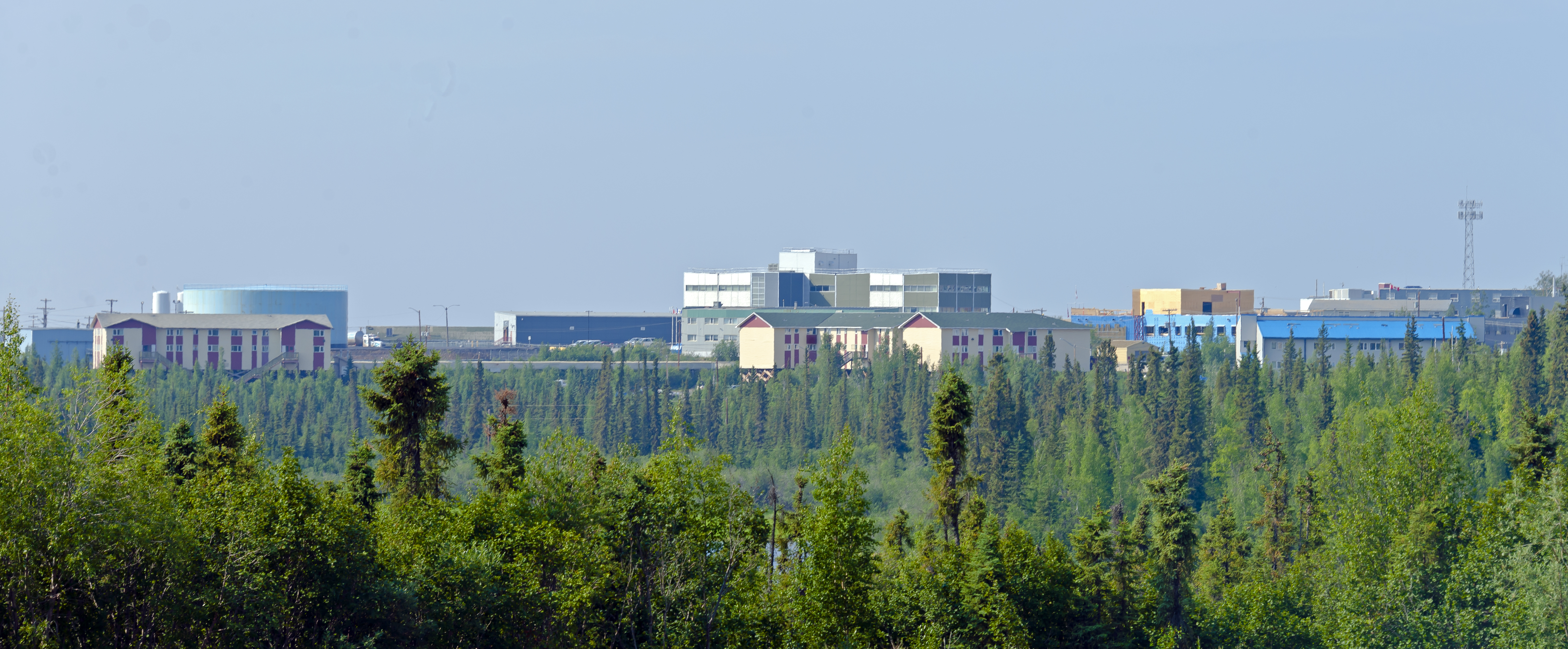
- Inuvik, the largest community in the region

- ISR in Yukon and NWT
- Country: Canada
- Territories: Northwest Territories; Yukon
- Inuvialuit Final Agreement: 1984
- Sub-regions: List: Beaufort Sea; Mackenzie River delta; Yukon coast; Northwest portion of Northwest Territories; Western Arctic Archipelago

Government
  - Type: Board of Directors
  - Chair & CEO: Erwin Elias

Area
  - Total: 435,000 km^{2} (168,000 sq mi)
  - Land: 90,650 km^{2} (35,000 sq mi)
- Lowest elevation: 0 m (0 ft)

Population (2021)
  - Total: 5,420
  - Density: 0.0598/km^{2} (0.155/sq mi)

Languages
  - Indigenous (Inuit languages): Inuvialuktun (Note: One of the official languages of the Northwest Territories.) (Sallirmiutun, Uummarmiutun, Kangiryuarmiutun)
  - Settler: English
- Time zone: UTC−06:00 (Northwest Territories Time)
- Website: Inuvialuit Regional Corporation
- The Northwest Territories area of the ISR is on MST (UTC−07:00) / MDT (UTC−06:00) but Herschel Island, Yukon is on MST all year.

Inu- ᐃᓄ- / nuna ᓄᓇ "person" / "land"
- Person: Inuvialuk
- People: Inuvialuit
- Language: Inuvialuktun
- Country: Inuvialuit Nunangit (part of Inuit Nunangat)

The Inuvialuit Settlement Region (ISR; Inuinnaqtun: Inuvialuit Nunangit Sannaiqtuaq – INS; French: Région désignée des Inuvialuit – RDI), located in Canada's western Arctic, was designated in 1984 in the Inuvialuit Final Agreement by the Government of Canada for the Inuvialuit. It spans 435,000 km (270,000 mi), including 90,650 km^{2} (35,000 sq mi) of land and 12,980 km^{2} (5,010 sq mi) of subsurface mineral rights. The ISR is mainly North of the tree line, and includes several sub-regions: the Beaufort Sea, the Mackenzie River delta, the northern portion of Yukon ("Yukon North Slope", Herschel Island), and the northwest portion of the Northwest Territories. The ISR includes both Crown Lands and Inuvialuit Private Lands. Most of the ISR is represented by Nunakput, the territorial electoral district, meaning "our land" in Inuvialuktun.

The ISR is one of the four Inuit regions of Canada, collectively known as Inuit Nunangat, represented by the Inuit Tapiriit Kanatami (ITK). The other regions are Nunatsiavut in Labrador, Nunavik in northern Quebec, and the territory of Nunavut. The ISR is the homeland of the Inuvialuit. The Inuvialuit Regional Corporation, established in 1986 as the receiver of the lands and financial compensation of the Inuvialuit Final Agreement, is controlled by the Inuvialuit population and is responsible for ISR operations. From 1996 until 2016, Nellie Cournoyea, former Premier of the Northwest Territories, was the Chair and CEO of the Board. She had been elected nine times before declining to run again. On 20 January 2026, Erwin Elias, was elected to replace Duane Ningaqsiq Smith, who was re-elected in 2019, and acclaimed in 2022.

The Inuvialuit Settlement Region Database contains descriptions of thousands of publications and research projects about the ISR. It is maintained by the Joint Secretariat—Inuvialuit Renewable Resource Committees and the Arctic Science and Technology Information System. Funding comes from Shell Canada and MGM Energy.

== Demographics ==
There are six communities in the ISR, Aklavik, Inuvik, Paulatuk, Sachs Harbour, Tuktoyaktuk, and Ulukhaktok and all are in the Northwest Territories. There are no Inuvialuit communities in the Yukon North Slope and it is estimated that the number of Inuvialuit living along the coast, as far east as the Baillie Islands, dropped from a high of 2,500 people to around 250 between 1850 and 1905. The drop in population is attributed to epidemics, such as smallpox, measles, and scarlet fever, caused by the arrival of whalers and fur traders.

These six communities, along with Fort McPherson and Tsiigehtchic, form the territorial Inuvik Region and, including Region 1 Unorganized, are Region 1, a federal census division.

In the 2021 Canadian census, the ISR population was 5,420 people, and change of −1.4% from the 2016 population of 5,495 people. In 2021, 3,145 (58%) people were Inuvialuit, that being the largest group in all six communities and a majority in five.

Community	Traditional name	Electoral district	Population (2021 Canadian census)								
Community	Traditional name	Electoral district	Total 2021	Total 2016	% change	Inuvialuit	% of total	First Nations	Métis	Multiple Indigenous (Note: Includes Indigenous responses and those not included elsewhere.)	Non Indigenous
Aklavik	Akłarvik (Note: Barrenground grizzly place)	Mackenzie Delta	536	590	-9.2%	320	59.7%	130	25	15	45
Inuvik	Inuuvik (Note: Place of man)	Boot Lake / Twin Lakes	3,137	3,243	-3.3%	1,265	40.3%	520	115	95	1,070
Paulatuk	Paulatuuq (Note: Place of coal)	Nunakput	298	265	12.5%	270	90.6%	0	0	0	15
Sachs Harbour	Ikaahuk (Note: Place to which you cross)	Nunakput	104	103	1.0%	95	91.3%	0	0	0	10
Tuktoyaktuk	Tuktuujaqrtuuq (Note: Looks like a caribou. Formerly known as Port Brabant, it became the first community in Canada to reclaim its original name.)	Nunakput	937	898	4.3%	815	87%	10	0	95	70
Ulukhaktok	Ulukhaqtuuq (Note: Where there is material for ulus. Renamed from Holman on 1 April 2006)	Nunakput	408	396	3.0%	380	93.1%	0	0	0	20

== Culture ==
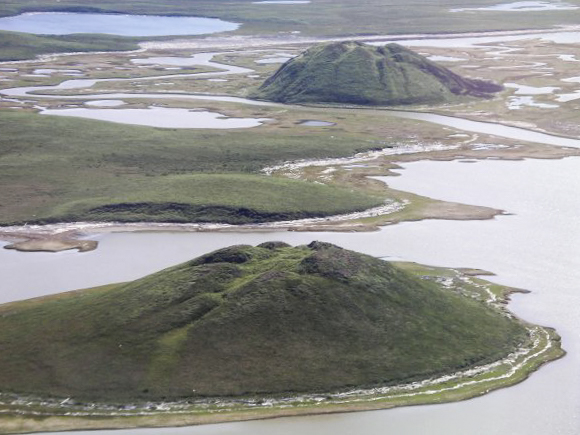
Pingos near Tuktoyaktuk

Inuvik, located on the East Channel of the Mackenzie Delta, approximately 100 km (62 mi) from the Arctic Ocean, is the region's administrative centre, home to the Inuvialuit Regional Corporation. The only other inland community, Aklavik, is located on the Peel Channel.

Hunting, fishing and trapping are the major economic activities of Paulatuk, in Amundsen Gulf's Darnley Bay, and Sachs Harbour, the only permanent settlement on Banks Island.

Tuktoyaktuk, formerly known as "Port Brabant", is set on Kugmallit Bay, near the Mackenzie River Delta. It has the only deepwater port in the ISR.

Ulukhaktok, formerly known as "Holman", is located on the west coast of Victoria Island. Printmaking has taken over as the primary source of income in recent years.

Kitigaaryuit is a former Inuvialuit settlement. It was the traditional territory of the Kitigaaryungmiut. The site, which is situated near the junction of the Mackenzie River's East Channel and Kugmallit Bay, encompasses the villages of Kitigaaryuk and Tchenerark, which are located on a small island, and the adjacent village of Kuugaatchiaq, located on the mainland to the west of the island.

Herschel Island, which is uninhabited, is part of the ISR although in Yukon and was traditionally occupied and used by the Inuvialuit. The island is an important part of Inuvialuit culture and the people sill visit the island to hunt and fish. At one time Herschel Island was inhabited by Paleo-Eskimo groups followed by Thule people, and finally the Inuvialuit, but in the latter half of the 20th century the population had migrated to government communities in the NWT.

Tarium Niryutait, is a marine protected area (MPA) located in the coastal areas of the Yukon and Northwest Territories in Canada. It is located within the ISR and was the first Arctic MPA established in Canada. The MPA was established with the goal of protecting beluga whales and the biodiversity of other bird and fish species and their habitats.

English is spoken in the entire region. Additionally, Sallirmiutun (formerly Siglitun) is spoken by the Siglit in Paulatuk, Sachs Harbour and Tuktoyaktuk. Uummarmiutun is spoken by the Uummarmiut in Inuvik and Aklavik. Kangiryuarmiutun (Inuinnaqtun) is spoken by the Kangiryuarmiut in Ulukhaktok and nowhere else in the Northwest Territories. Together they are grouped under Inuvialuktun.

== Climate ==
The ISR is dominated by subarctic climate in the south and tundra climate in the north.

Climate data for Aklavik (Aklavik/Freddie Carmichael Airport) Climate ID: 2200105 / 2200100; coordinates 63°13′24″N 135°00′20″W; elevation: 6.4 m (21 ft); 1991–2020 normals, extremes 1926-present
Month	Jan	Feb	Mar	Apr	May	Jun	Jul	Aug	Sep	Oct	Nov	Dec	Year
Record high humidex	6.1	3.8	8.6	12.8	24.6	34.6	35.5	33.8	26.5	16.4	4.3	1.6	35.5
Record high °C (°F)	9.5 (49.1)	4.3 (39.7)	11.0 (51.8)	15.4 (59.7)	23.7 (74.7)	31.8 (89.2)	31.7 (89.1)	31.9 (89.4)	27.6 (81.7)	17.0 (62.6)	5.9 (42.6)	11.2 (52.2)	31.9 (89.4)
Mean daily maximum °C (°F)	−22.6 (−8.7)	−21.5 (−6.7)	−16.1 (3.0)	−5.4 (22.3)	5.2 (41.4)	16.6 (61.9)	18.7 (65.7)	15.3 (59.5)	7.4 (45.3)	−4.2 (24.4)	−15.0 (5.0)	−21.2 (−6.2)	−3.6 (25.5)
Daily mean °C (°F)	−26.3 (−15.3)	−25.5 (−13.9)	−21.0 (−5.8)	−11.4 (11.5)	0.6 (33.1)	11.5 (52.7)	—	—	4.4 (39.9)	−6.7 (19.9)	−18.2 (−0.8)	−24.4 (−11.9)	—
Mean daily minimum °C (°F)	−30.3 (−22.5)	−29.5 (−21.1)	−26.4 (−15.5)	−17.0 (1.4)	−4.0 (24.8)	6.2 (43.2)	—	—	1.4 (34.5)	−9.0 (15.8)	−21.6 (−6.9)	−28.0 (−18.4)	—
Record low °C (°F)	−48.5 (−55.3)	−45.8 (−50.4)	−47.8 (−54.0)	−34.8 (−30.6)	−26.5 (−15.7)	−6.4 (20.5)	0.6 (33.1)	−2.8 (27.0)	−11.0 (12.2)	−35.1 (−31.2)	−39.5 (−39.1)	−44.5 (−48.1)	−48.5 (−55.3)
Record low wind chill	−49.6	−51.6	−47.9	−35.1	−21.3	−8.2	0.0	−6.7	−8.7	−25.9	−46.1	−52.2	−52.2
Average precipitation mm (inches)	15.9 (0.63)	12.2 (0.48)	13.2 (0.52)	8.8 (0.35)	12.6 (0.50)	21.9 (0.86)	—	—	33.5 (1.32)	—	—	—	—
Average rainfall mm (inches)	0.0 (0.0)	0.0 (0.0)	0.0 (0.0)	0.1 (0.00)	5.3 (0.21)	21.0 (0.83)	—	—	26 (1.0)	0.8 (0.03)	0.0 (0.0)	0.0 (0.0)	—
Average snowfall cm (inches)	15.9 (6.3)	12.2 (4.8)	13.2 (5.2)	8.7 (3.4)	7.5 (3.0)	0.8 (0.3)	0.0 (0.0)	0.4 (0.2)	8.9 (3.5)	—	—	—	—
Average precipitation days (≥ 0.2 mm)	9.2	9.0	7.4	5.4	6.1	7.6	—	—	13.5	—	—	—	—
Average rainy days (≥ 0.2 mm)	0.0	0.0	0.0	0.06	2.5	7.3	—	—	10.8	0.67	0.0	0.0	—
Average snowy days (≥ 0.2 cm)	9.2	9.0	7.4	5.4	3.8	0.35	0.0	0.06	2.8	—	—	—	—
Source: Environment and Climate Change Canada

Climate data for Inuvik (Inuvik (Mike Zubko) Airport) Climate ID: 2202570; coordinates 68°18′15″N 133°28′58″W; elevation: 67.7 m (222 ft); 1991–2020 normals, extremes 1957–present (Note: Includes composite data from Inuvik A: Climate ID: 2202571; coordinates 68°18′14″N 133°28′59″W; elevation: 67.7 m (222 ft) and Inuvik Climate / Inuvik UA; WMO ID: 71364 / 71957; 68°19′N 133°31′W; elevation: 103.0 m (337.9 ft) / 103.2 m (339 ft). Sunshine from 1951–1980)
Month	Jan	Feb	Mar	Apr	May	Jun	Jul	Aug	Sep	Oct	Nov	Dec	Year
Record high humidex	5.9	4.9	8.4	14.9	29.2	35.8	40.0	36.6	26.7	20.6	10.0	5.0	40.0
Record high °C (°F)	7.1 (44.8)	5.2 (41.4)	8.7 (47.7)	15.3 (59.5)	30.1 (86.2)	32.8 (91.0)	33.0 (91.4)	34.8 (94.6)	26.7 (80.1)	20.9 (69.6)	10.6 (51.1)	5.0 (41.0)	34.8 (94.6)
Mean daily maximum °C (°F)	−21.4 (−6.5)	−19.5 (−3.1)	−16.3 (2.7)	−5.6 (21.9)	6.3 (43.3)	17.5 (63.5)	19.3 (66.7)	15.4 (59.7)	7.9 (46.2)	−3.0 (26.6)	−14.3 (6.3)	−19.7 (−3.5)	−2.8 (27.0)
Daily mean °C (°F)	−24.9 (−12.8)	−23.5 (−10.3)	−21.1 (−6.0)	−10.6 (12.9)	1.5 (34.7)	11.6 (52.9)	14.2 (57.6)	10.9 (51.6)	4.4 (39.9)	−5.9 (21.4)	−17.6 (0.3)	−23.0 (−9.4)	−7.0 (19.4)
Mean daily minimum °C (°F)	−28.4 (−19.1)	−27.3 (−17.1)	−25.8 (−14.4)	−15.5 (4.1)	−3.3 (26.1)	5.7 (42.3)	9.0 (48.2)	6.4 (43.5)	0.8 (33.4)	−8.6 (16.5)	−20.8 (−5.4)	−26.4 (−15.5)	−11.2 (11.8)
Record low °C (°F)	−54.4 (−65.9)	−56.7 (−70.1)	−50.6 (−59.1)	−46.1 (−51.0)	−27.8 (−18.0)	−6.1 (21.0)	−3.3 (26.1)	−6.1 (21.0)	−20.1 (−4.2)	−35.0 (−31.0)	−46.1 (−51.0)	−50.0 (−58.0)	−56.7 (−70.1)
Record low wind chill	−64.1	−67.0	−59.6	−51.1	−35.2	−13.3	−5.2	−9.2	−23.4	−43.1	−55.0	−59.6	−67.0
Average precipitation mm (inches)	13.4 (0.53)	10.8 (0.43)	13.6 (0.54)	9.9 (0.39)	13.7 (0.54)	23.5 (0.93)	40.1 (1.58)	42.4 (1.67)	32.5 (1.28)	23.0 (0.91)	15.2 (0.60)	11.7 (0.46)	249.8 (9.83)
Average rainfall mm (inches)	—	0.0 (0.0)	0.0 (0.0)	0.3 (0.01)	6.0 (0.24)	—	31.8 (1.25)	36.0 (1.42)	17.7 (0.70)	1.1 (0.04)	0.3 (0.01)	0.0 (0.0)	—
Average snowfall cm (inches)	—	22.7 (8.9)	23.1 (9.1)	13.3 (5.2)	9.7 (3.8)	—	0.0 (0.0)	0.7 (0.3)	—	32.9 (13.0)	29.7 (11.7)	25.7 (10.1)	—
Average precipitation days (≥ 0.2 mm)	10.8	10.2	11.9	8.0	8.1	8.9	12.8	14.8	13.9	14.8	14.1	11.2	139.5
Average rainy days (≥ 0.2 mm)	—	0.1	0.0	0.1	2.7	—	9.6	13.0	8.9	0.9	0.2	0.2	—
Average snowy days (≥ 0.2 cm)	—	11.6	11.9	5.6	4.2	—	0.1	0.6	—	11.5	12.3	10.9	—
Average relative humidity (%) (at 1500 LST)	68.7	66.6	58.5	57.5	57.9	49.7	57.2	64.1	70.1	79.4	76.6	71.2	64.8
Mean monthly sunshine hours	7.3	65.2	174.1	248.7	295.0	375.1	339.8	216.2	109.4	50.2	17.8	0.0	1,898.8
Source: Environment and Climate Change Canada (January maximum) (April maximum) (May maximum) (July maximum) (August maximum) (sunshine)

Climate data for Paulatuk (Paulatuk (Nora Aliqatchialuk Ruben) Airport) WMO ID: 71984; coordinates 69°21′28″N 124°04′57″W; elevation: 6.3 m (21 ft); 1991–2020 normals, extremes 1985−present (Note: Includes composite data from Paulatuk A: Climate ID: 2203055; coordinates 69°21′38″N 124°04′33″W; elevation: 4.6 m (15 ft) and Paulatuk A: Climate ID: 2203057; coordinates 69°21′40″N 124°04′31″W; elevation: 4.6 m (15 ft))
Month	Jan	Feb	Mar	Apr	May	Jun	Jul	Aug	Sep	Oct	Nov	Dec	Year
Record high humidex	3.2	13.7	−0.3	10.4	21.8	30.1	33.6	31.7	23.4	14.9	6.6	1.9	33.6
Record high °C (°F)	4.0 (39.2)	−2.6 (27.3)	1.4 (34.5)	11.5 (52.7)	23.1 (73.6)	29.5 (85.1)	30.2 (86.4)	30.0 (86.0)	20.7 (69.3)	16.2 (61.2)	7.6 (45.7)	3.0 (37.4)	30.2 (86.4)
Mean daily maximum °C (°F)	−21.0 (−5.8)	−21.4 (−6.5)	−18.9 (−2.0)	−9.7 (14.5)	1.1 (34.0)	9.8 (49.6)	14.2 (57.6)	12.2 (54.0)	6.0 (42.8)	−2.7 (27.1)	−12.2 (10.0)	−18.8 (−1.8)	−5.1 (22.8)
Daily mean °C (°F)	−24.7 (−12.5)	−25.2 (−13.4)	−23.3 (−9.9)	−14.5 (5.9)	−2.8 (27.0)	5.6 (42.1)	10.3 (50.5)	9.0 (48.2)	3.5 (38.3)	−5.2 (22.6)	−15.6 (3.9)	−22.3 (−8.1)	−8.8 (16.2)
Mean daily minimum °C (°F)	−28.3 (−18.9)	−29.0 (−20.2)	−27.6 (−17.7)	−19.2 (−2.6)	−6.6 (20.1)	1.5 (34.7)	6.4 (43.5)	5.7 (42.3)	0.9 (33.6)	−7.6 (18.3)	−18.8 (−1.8)	−25.9 (−14.6)	−12.4 (9.7)
Record low °C (°F)	−42.0 (−43.6)	−44.1 (−47.4)	−47.4 (−53.3)	−36.8 (−34.2)	−28.7 (−19.7)	−6.2 (20.8)	−2.0 (28.4)	−3.2 (26.2)	−11.0 (12.2)	−34.1 (−29.4)	−37.5 (−35.5)	−42.6 (−44.7)	−47.4 (−53.3)
Record low wind chill	−55.5	−56.6	−59.6	−48.2	−35.6	−12.0	−6.6	−9.5	−20.0	−49.9	−48.6	−49.9	−59.6
Average precipitation mm (inches)	14.2 (0.56)	13.8 (0.54)	16.8 (0.66)	14.8 (0.58)	12.9 (0.51)	18.8 (0.74)	25.2 (0.99)	35.4 (1.39)	25.0 (0.98)	22.5 (0.89)	15.1 (0.59)	12.6 (0.50)	227.0 (8.94)
Average rainfall mm (inches)	0.0 (0.0)	0.0 (0.0)	0.0 (0.0)	0.2 (0.01)	3.7 (0.15)	16.1 (0.63)	26.4 (1.04)	—	—	1.6 (0.06)	0.1 (0.00)	0.0 (0.0)	—
Average snowfall cm (inches)	15.7 (6.2)	12.5 (4.9)	16.5 (6.5)	12.6 (5.0)	12.1 (4.8)	0.8 (0.3)	0.0 (0.0)	1.9 (0.7)	7.7 (3.0)	28.6 (11.3)	21.9 (8.6)	—	—
Average precipitation days (≥ 0.2 mm)	11.4	10.8	11.2	9.0	7.9	8.7	11.0	14.2	13.3	13.1	11.6	12.0	134
Average rainy days (≥ 0.2 mm)	0.0	0.0	0.0	0.06	1.7	7.0	11	—	—	0.93	0.1	0.0	—
Average snowy days (≥ 0.2 cm)	9.7	8.2	9.4	7.1	5.8	0.72	0.0	0.87	4.1	12.1	12.1	—	—
Average relative humidity (%) (at 1500 LST)	78.1	75.9	72.8	71.1	75.4	75.5	72.8	76.5	78.3	82.5	83.1	80.2	76.8
Source: Environment and Climate Change Canada

Climate data for Sachs Harbour (Sachs Harbour (David Nasogaluak Jr. Saaryuaq) Airport} Climate ID: 2503650; coordinates 72°00′N 125°16′W; elevation: 86.3 m (283 ft); 1991–2020 normals, extremes 1955−present (Note: Composite data from Sachs Harbour A; Climate ID: 2503649; coordinates 72°59′37″N 125°14′29″W; elevation: 86.3 m (283 ft) and Sachs Harbour Climate; Climate ID: 2503648; coordinates 72°59′33″N 125°15′15″W; elevation: 87.5 m (287 ft). Sunshine from 1951–1980)
Month	Jan	Feb	Mar	Apr	May	Jun	Jul	Aug	Sep	Oct	Nov	Dec	Year
Record high humidex	15.0	−6.1	−3.2	2.6	9.4	22.1	31.9	26.0	15.9	3.9	1.1	−4.0	31.9
Record high °C (°F)	−4.4 (24.1)	−4.5 (23.9)	−3.2 (26.2)	5.4 (41.7)	10.0 (50.0)	20.5 (68.9)	24.2 (75.6)	23.2 (73.8)	15.6 (60.1)	4.4 (39.9)	1.7 (35.1)	−4.0 (24.8)	24.2 (75.6)
Mean daily maximum °C (°F)	−23.8 (−10.8)	−24.4 (−11.9)	−22.8 (−9.0)	−13.6 (7.5)	−3.6 (25.5)	6.3 (43.3)	9.8 (49.6)	7.2 (45.0)	1.5 (34.7)	−6.5 (20.3)	−15.3 (4.5)	−21.7 (−7.1)	−8.9 (16.0)
Daily mean °C (°F)	−27.4 (−17.3)	−27.8 (−18.0)	−26.4 (−15.5)	−17.2 (1.0)	−6.6 (20.1)	3.4 (38.1)	6.5 (43.7)	4.4 (39.9)	−0.6 (30.9)	−9.3 (15.3)	−18.6 (−1.5)	−25.1 (−13.2)	−12.1 (10.2)
Mean daily minimum °C (°F)	−31.0 (−23.8)	−31.2 (−24.2)	−29.9 (−21.8)	−20.8 (−5.4)	−9.4 (15.1)	0.4 (32.7)	3.3 (37.9)	1.5 (34.7)	−2.8 (27.0)	−12.2 (10.0)	−22.1 (−7.8)	−28.5 (−19.3)	−15.2 (4.6)
Record low °C (°F)	−52.2 (−62.0)	−50.2 (−58.4)	−48.4 (−55.1)	−43.0 (−45.4)	−26.7 (−16.1)	−16.5 (2.3)	−5.0 (23.0)	−11.0 (12.2)	−22.8 (−9.0)	−35.5 (−31.9)	−42.8 (−45.0)	−45.0 (−49.0)	−52.2 (−62.0)
Record low wind chill	−71.6	−68.1	−66.1	−58.4	−40.3	−22.1	−10.3	−16.0	−31.2	−44.9	−55.5	−64.1	−71.6
Average precipitation mm (inches)	5.8 (0.23)	5.3 (0.21)	8.5 (0.33)	9.4 (0.37)	6.7 (0.26)	9.4 (0.37)	14.2 (0.56)	25.5 (1.00)	21.2 (0.83)	17.7 (0.70)	9.5 (0.37)	6.6 (0.26)	139.7 (5.50)
Average rainfall mm (inches)	0.0 (0.0)	0.0 (0.0)	0.0 (0.0)	0.0 (0.0)	0.2 (0.01)	4.5 (0.18)	13.6 (0.54)	—	9.1 (0.36)	—	0.0 (0.0)	0.0 (0.0)	—
Average snowfall cm (inches)	6.0 (2.4)	6.5 (2.6)	—	7.7 (3.0)	—	2.2 (0.9)	0.3 (0.1)	3.1 (1.2)	10.6 (4.2)	—	—	—	—
Average precipitation days (≥ 0.2 mm)	8.9	6.2	8.7	7.5	7.9	5.7	7.7	13.8	13.7	14.3	11.2	7.8	113.2
Average rainy days (≥ 0.2 mm)	0.0	0.0	0.0	0.0	0.4	3.1	6.8	—	5.6	—	0.0	0.0	—
Average snowy days (≥ 0.2 cm)	8.2	6.2	—	6.2	—	1.4	0.4	3.0	7.4	—	—	—	—
Average relative humidity (%) (at 1500 LST)	78.4	77.3	79.1	82.2	83.4	80.6	78.2	84.3	87.2	89.5	85.4	80.7	82.2
Mean monthly sunshine hours	0.1	42.6	165.8	264.8	284.6	330.6	335.7	189.8	79.7	38.7	4.3	0.0	1,736.7
Source: Environment and Climate Change Canada Canadian Climate Normals 1991-2020 (sunshine)

Climate data for Tuktoyaktuk (Tuktoyaktuk/James Gruben Airport) WMO ID: 71985; coordinates 69°26′N 133°01′W; elevation: 4.6 m (15 ft); 1991–2020 normals, extremes 1948–present (Note: Includes composite data from Tuktoyaktuk A: Climate ID: 2203912 / 2203911; coordinates 69°26′00″N 133°01′35″W; elevation: 4.3 m (14 ft))
Month	Jan	Feb	Mar	Apr	May	Jun	Jul	Aug	Sep	Oct	Nov	Dec	Year
Record high humidex	3.8	0.7	3.0	7.0	23.9	32.3	34.2	32.9	22.4	17.2	2.4	0.6	34.2
Record high °C (°F)	4.0 (39.2)	0.7 (33.3)	3.2 (37.8)	8.3 (46.9)	25.2 (77.4)	29.4 (84.9)	30.4 (86.7)	29.9 (85.8)	21.1 (70.0)	17.9 (64.2)	2.5 (36.5)	0.8 (33.4)	30.4 (86.7)
Mean daily maximum °C (°F)	−22.0 (−7.6)	−22.1 (−7.8)	−19.6 (−3.3)	−9.8 (14.4)	1.3 (34.3)	11.6 (52.9)	15.5 (59.9)	12.5 (54.5)	6.3 (43.3)	−3.6 (25.5)	−13.7 (7.3)	−20.3 (−4.5)	−5.3 (22.5)
Daily mean °C (°F)	−25.8 (−14.4)	−26.0 (−14.8)	−24.0 (−11.2)	−14.6 (5.7)	−2.5 (27.5)	7.0 (44.6)	11.4 (52.5)	9.2 (48.6)	3.6 (38.5)	−6.3 (20.7)	−17.1 (1.2)	−23.8 (−10.8)	−9.1 (15.6)
Mean daily minimum °C (°F)	−29.5 (−21.1)	−29.8 (−21.6)	−28.4 (−19.1)	−19.3 (−2.7)	−6.3 (20.7)	2.4 (36.3)	7.3 (45.1)	5.9 (42.6)	0.9 (33.6)	−8.8 (16.2)	−20.5 (−4.9)	−27.2 (−17.0)	−12.8 (9.0)
Record low °C (°F)	−48.9 (−56.0)	−46.6 (−51.9)	−45.5 (−49.9)	−42.8 (−45.0)	−28.9 (−20.0)	−8.4 (16.9)	−1.7 (28.9)	−2.5 (27.5)	−12.8 (9.0)	−36.2 (−33.2)	−40.1 (−40.2)	−46.7 (−52.1)	−48.9 (−56.0)
Record low wind chill	−70.8	−61.2	−58.1	−55.5	−40.1	−16.5	−6.5	−8.9	−21.6	−43.5	−50.8	−58.9	−70.8
Average precipitation mm (inches)	10.5 (0.41)	8.9 (0.35)	7.2 (0.28)	8.3 (0.33)	6.8 (0.27)	11.0 (0.43)	22.3 (0.88)	25.7 (1.01)	23.3 (0.92)	18.4 (0.72)	9.6 (0.38)	8.7 (0.34)	160.7 (6.33)
Average rainfall mm (inches)	0.0 (0.0)	0.0 (0.0)	0.0 (0.0)	0.0 (0.0)	1.4 (0.06)	9.7 (0.38)	22.2 (0.87)	24.4 (0.96)	15.5 (0.61)	1.3 (0.05)	0.0 (0.0)	0.3 (0.01)	74.9 (2.95)
Average snowfall cm (inches)	13.4 (5.3)	10.2 (4.0)	9.0 (3.5)	9.4 (3.7)	6.2 (2.4)	1.3 (0.5)	0.1 (0.0)	1.2 (0.5)	8.9 (3.5)	20.1 (7.9)	12.1 (4.8)	11.2 (4.4)	103.1 (40.6)
Average precipitation days (≥ 0.2 mm)	8.4	7.3	7.1	5.5	4.9	5.1	10.1	12.7	12.7	13.3	9.6	8.9	105.6
Average rainy days (≥ 0.2 mm)	0.05	0.05	0.0	0.0	1.1	4.3	10.0	12.4	9.0	1.1	0.0	0.10	38.1
Average snowy days (≥ 0.2 cm)	8.6	7.4	7.5	5.8	4.2	1.0	0.14	0.90	5.0	13.0	9.9	9.1	72.5
Average relative humidity (%) (at 1500 LST)	78.4	78.4	75.7	77.5	77.2	69.3	69.7	75.4	79.0	86.7	85.0	80.6	76.7
Source: Environment and Climate Change Canada (rain / rain days, snow / snow days and precipitation / precipitation days 1981–2010)

Climate data for Ulukhaktok (Ulukhaktok/Holman Airport) Climate ID: 2502501; coordinates 70°45′46″N 117°48′22″W; elevation: 36.0 m (118.1 ft); 1991–2020 normals, extremes 1979−present
Month	Jan	Feb	Mar	Apr	May	Jun	Jul	Aug	Sep	Oct	Nov	Dec	Year
Record high humidex	−6.5	−9.1	−3.8	7.1	10.4	23.0	26.3	27.2	17.0	5.2	−1.8	−3.6	27.2
Record high °C (°F)	−4.0 (24.8)	−6.5 (20.3)	−3.5 (25.7)	7.6 (45.7)	11.5 (52.7)	22.6 (72.7)	29.0 (84.2)	25.5 (77.9)	15.8 (60.4)	5.9 (42.6)	1.1 (34.0)	−3.0 (26.6)	29.0 (84.2)
Mean daily maximum °C (°F)	−23.5 (−10.3)	−24.3 (−11.7)	−21.5 (−6.7)	−12.6 (9.3)	−2.8 (27.0)	7.9 (46.2)	13.0 (55.4)	9.9 (49.8)	3.3 (37.9)	−5.4 (22.3)	−14.3 (6.3)	−21.0 (−5.8)	−7.6 (18.3)
Daily mean °C (°F)	−27.2 (−17.0)	−28.0 (−18.4)	−25.5 (−13.9)	−16.9 (1.6)	−6.0 (21.2)	4.8 (40.6)	9.3 (48.7)	7.1 (44.8)	1.1 (34.0)	−8.1 (17.4)	−17.6 (0.3)	−24.4 (−11.9)	−10.9 (12.4)
Mean daily minimum °C (°F)	−30.8 (−23.4)	−31.6 (−24.9)	−29.5 (−21.1)	−21.2 (−6.2)	−9.2 (15.4)	1.6 (34.9)	5.6 (42.1)	4.2 (39.6)	−1.0 (30.2)	−10.6 (12.9)	−20.9 (−5.6)	−27.7 (−17.9)	−14.3 (6.3)
Record low °C (°F)	−47.5 (−53.5)	−49.0 (−56.2)	−45.0 (−49.0)	−42.1 (−43.8)	−30.3 (−22.5)	−12.5 (9.5)	−3.5 (25.7)	−5.5 (22.1)	−15.5 (4.1)	−36.8 (−34.2)	−37.5 (−35.5)	−42.8 (−45.0)	−49.0 (−56.2)
Record low wind chill	−59.8	−65.9	−62.0	−49.2	−39.4	−21.3	−7.6	−12.1	−19.3	−36.0	−50.8	−53.1	−65.9
Average precipitation mm (inches)	10.2 (0.40)	8.9 (0.35)	10.5 (0.41)	7.5 (0.30)	8.9 (0.35)	10.9 (0.43)	23.6 (0.93)	31.5 (1.24)	22.5 (0.89)	17.2 (0.68)	13.4 (0.53)	10.6 (0.42)	175.7 (6.92)
Average rainfall mm (inches)	0.0 (0.0)	0.0 (0.0)	0.0 (0.0)	0.0 (0.0)	1.2 (0.05)	8.7 (0.34)	21.9 (0.86)	30.6 (1.20)	13.0 (0.51)	0.7 (0.03)	0.0 (0.0)	0.0 (0.0)	76.1 (3.00)
Average snowfall cm (inches)	9.7 (3.8)	7.9 (3.1)	8.3 (3.3)	5.8 (2.3)	5.9 (2.3)	1.3 (0.5)	0.0 (0.0)	2.0 (0.8)	7.2 (2.8)	18.9 (7.4)	15.0 (5.9)	9.9 (3.9)	91.8 (36.1)
Average precipitation days (≥ 0.2 mm)	8.8	8.0	8.3	6.7	6.9	6.4	9.3	12.6	11.9	11.5	10.6	8.7	109.7
Average rainy days (≥ 0.2 mm)	0.06	0.0	0.0	0.0	0.56	4.5	8.0	11.1	6.6	0.31	0.0	0.0	31.1
Average snowy days (≥ 0.2 cm)	6.1	5.6	6.2	4.5	4.7	1.2	0.06	0.71	3.8	10.6	9.3	6.4	58.9
Average relative humidity (%) (at 1500 LST)	76.4	75.9	75.2	71.2	74.4	73.1	69.4	75.8	79.7	84.5	83.3	78.5	76.4
Source: Environment and Climate Change Canada

== Wildlife ==
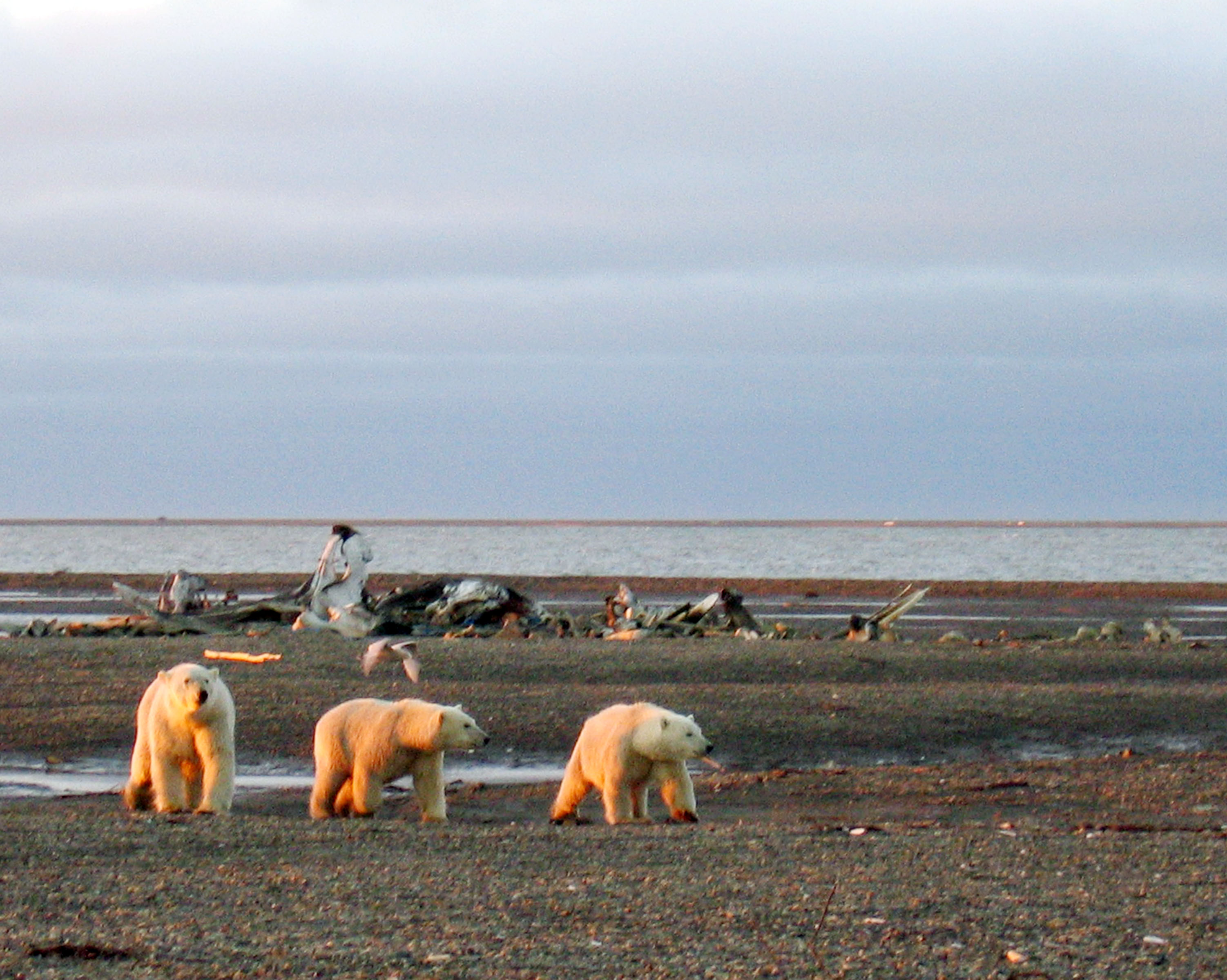
Polar bears on the Beaufort Sea coast

The Inuvialuit Renewable Resource Conservation and Management Plan sets the strategy for fish and wildlife management and conservation. Integrated management planning of the region's marine and coastal areas is described in the Beaufort Sea Integrated Management Planning Initiative. Wildlife includes Arctic char, Arctic fox, beluga whale, bearded seal, bowhead whale, caribou, moose, muskox, polar bear, ringed seal, and whitefish.

Migratory bird management within the ISR is handled by policies, principles, and regulations described in the Conservation of Migratory Birds in the Inuvialuit Settlement Region report.

== Protected areas ==
There are several protected parks and bird sanctuaries in the ISR. There are five parks: Aulavik National Park, Qikiqtaruk Territorial Park (Herschel Island), Ivvavik National Park, Pingo Canadian Landmark, and Tuktut Nogait National Park. There are also five migratory bird sanctuaries in the region: Anderson River Delta Migratory Bird Sanctuary, Banks Island No. 1 and Banks Island No. 2 Bird Sanctuary, Cape Parry Migratory Bird Sanctuary, and Kendall Island Migratory Bird Sanctuary

== Natural resources ==
The area is rich in non-renewable hydrocarbon resources. There are proven commercial quantities of natural gas, nickel, petroleum, and zinc.

The ISR's Inuvialuit Private Lands are divided into those where the Inuvialuit own surface and subsurface minerals, or those lands with only surface rights.
