= Inuvialuit =

Inuit subgroup

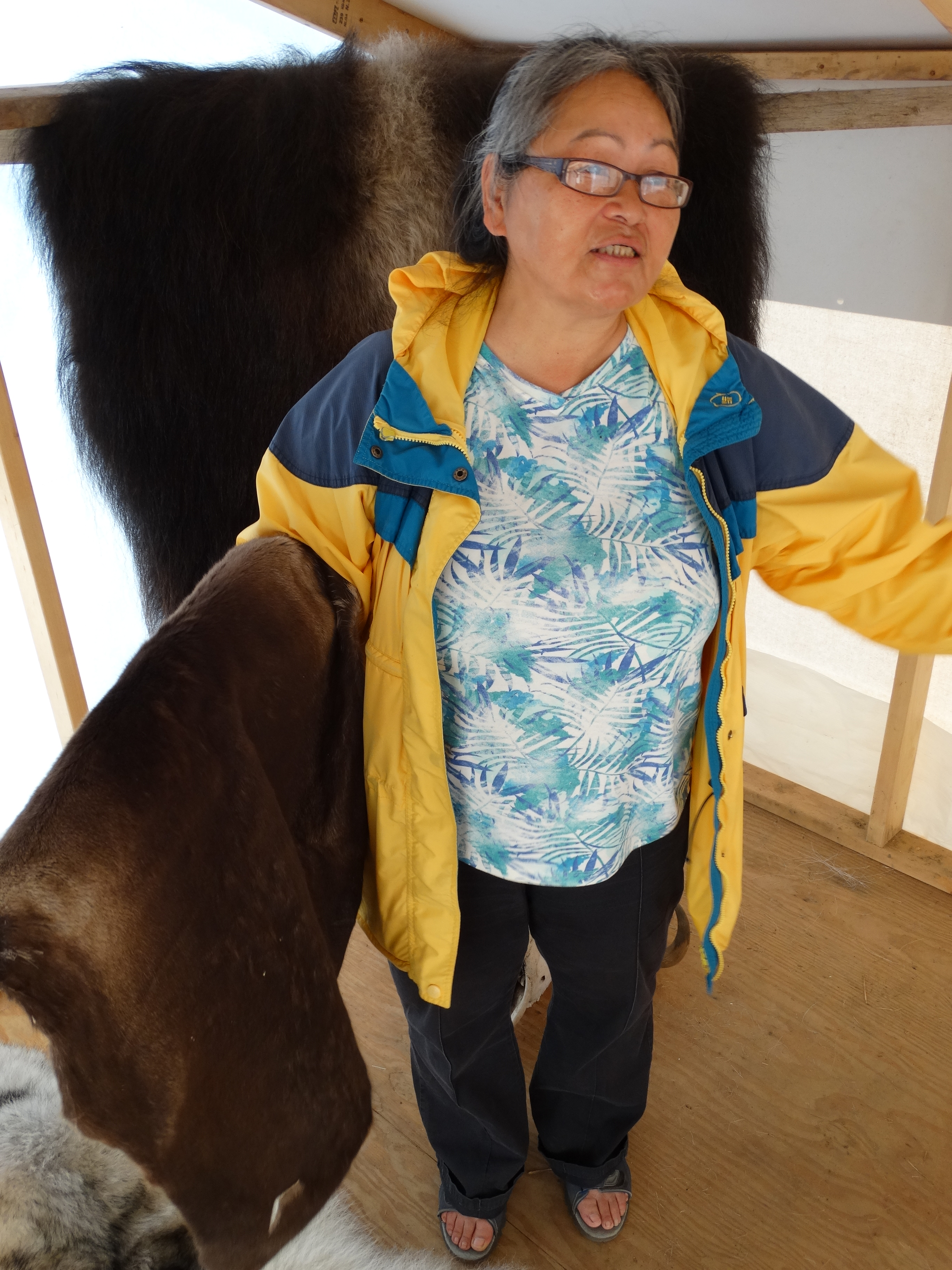
- Eileen Jacobson, Inuvialuk guide

Total population
- 3,145 (as of 2021)

Regions with significant populations
- Canada; Northwest Territories

Languages
- Inuvialuktun (Note: One of the official languages of the Northwest Territories.) (Sallirmiutun, Uummarmiutun, Kangiryuarmiutun), English

Religion
- Inuit religion, Christianity

Related ethnic groups
- Other Inuit and Eskimo

The Inuvialuit (sing. Inuvialuk; 'the real people') or Western Canadian Inuit are Inuit who live in the western Canadian Arctic region. They, like all other Inuit, are descendants of the Thule who migrated eastward from Alaska. Their homeland – the Inuvialuit Settlement Region – covers the Arctic Ocean coastline area from the Alaskan border, east through the Beaufort Sea and beyond the Amundsen Gulf which includes some of the western Canadian Arctic Islands, as well as the inland community of Aklavik and part of Yukon. The land was demarked in 1984 by the Inuvialuit Final Agreement.

== History and migration ==
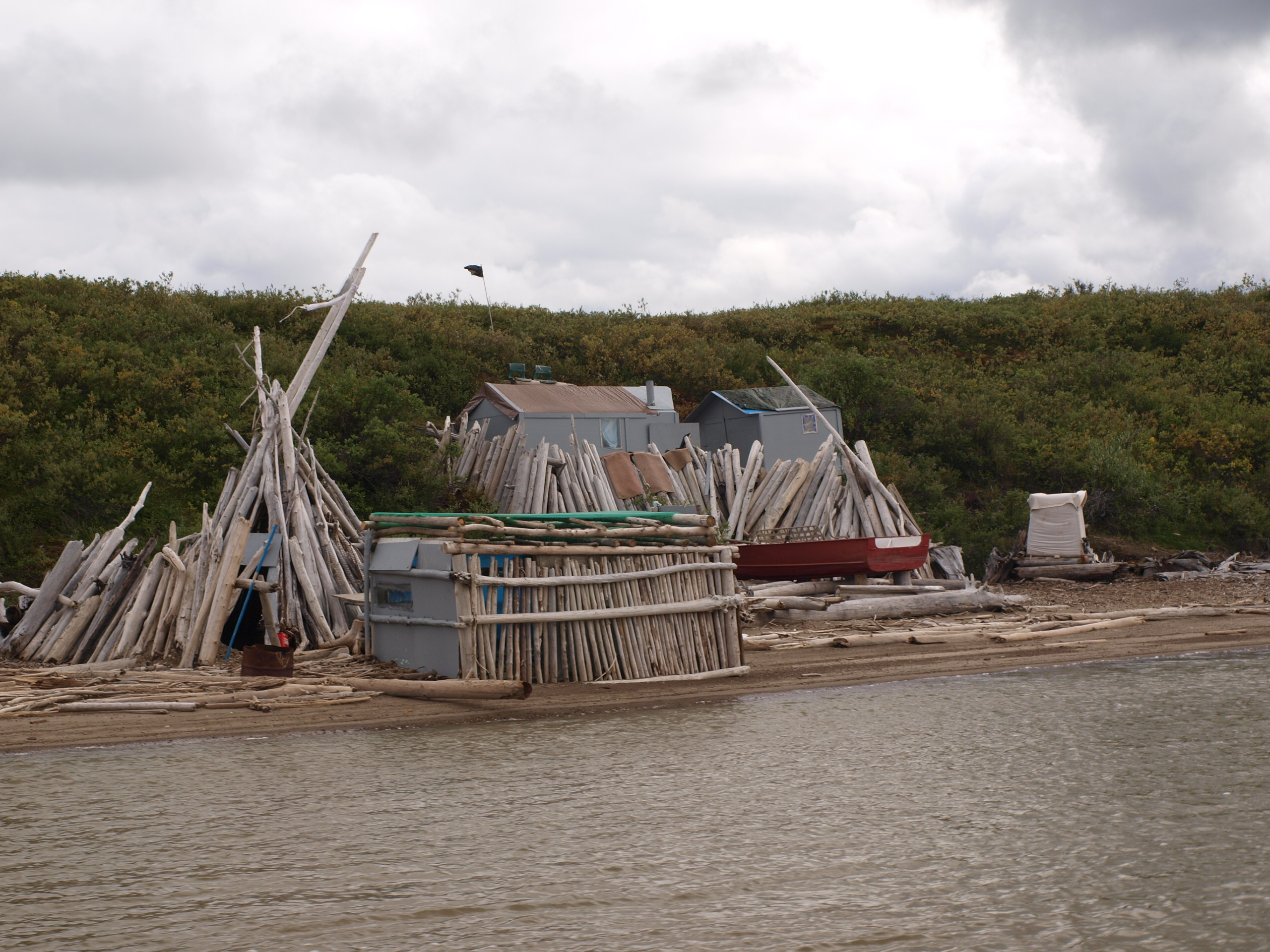
Traditional Inuvialuit whaling camp near Tuktoyaktuk

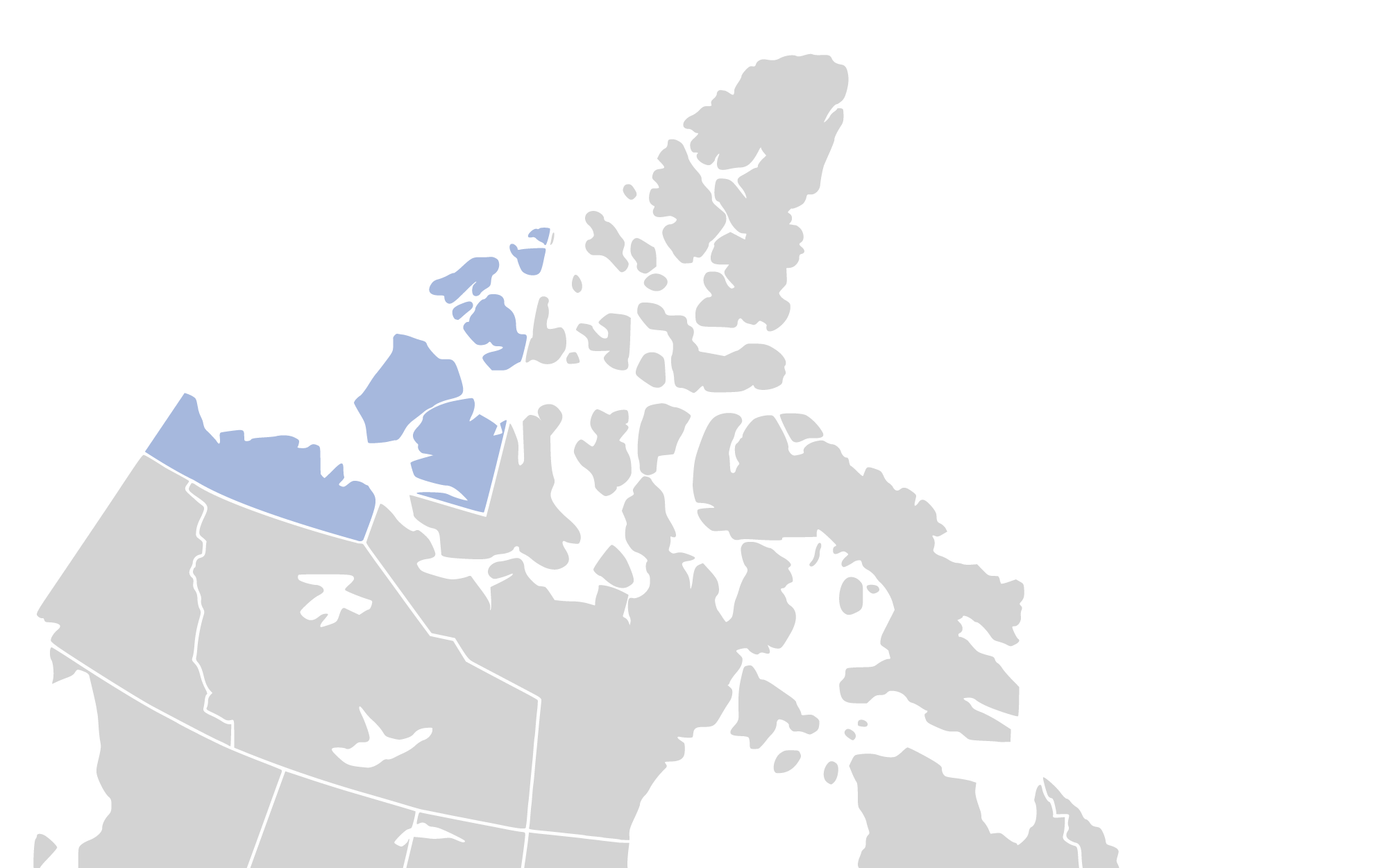
Map of the Inuvialuit homeland

Inu- ᐃᓄ- / nuna ᓄᓇ "person" / "land"
- Person: Inuvialuk
- People: Inuvialuit
- Language: Inuvialuktun
- Country: Inuvialuit Nunangit (part of Inuit Nunangat)

The Inuvialuit Settlement Region was primarily inhabited by Siglit Inuit until their numbers were decimated by the introduction of new diseases in the second half of the 19th century. Nunamiut, Alaskan Iñupiat, moved into traditional Siglit areas in the 1910s and 20s, enticed in part by renewed demand for furs from the Hudson's Bay Company and European markets. The Nunamiut who settled in the Siglit area became known as Uummarmiut. Originally, there was an intense dislike between the Siglit and the Uummarmiut, but these differences faded over the years, and the two aboriginal peoples intermarried. With improved healthcare and Nunatamiut intermarriage, the Inuvialuit now number approximately 3,100.

In the 1930s, the Inuvialuit were involved in a Canadian government scheme to introduce reindeer herding as the primary economic driver of the Western Arctic. At tremendous expense, thousands of domesticated animals were herded from Alaska to the new Mackenzie Delta community of Reindeer Station. Indigenous Sámi people were brought from Norway to teach Inuvialuit men how to care for their own individual herds. However, the program was relatively unsuccessful, as it required a lonely lifestyle and was less lucrative than traditional hunting and trapping.

The Inuvialuit Settlement Region Traditional Knowledge Report of 2006 identified additional naming characteristics. Those Inuvialuit who live in the west are called Ualinirmiut (Ualiniq) by the people of the east. The Inuvialuit who occupy the east are known as Kivaninmiut (Kivaliniq) by the people of the west.

The Inuit of Ulukhaktok are neither Siglit nor Uummarmiut but are Copper Inuit and refer to themselves as Ulukhaktokmuit after Ulukhaktok, the native name for what used to be called Holman.

The proposed Mackenzie Valley Pipeline would have passed through both Inuvialuit and Gwichʼin territory before the abandonment of the project in 2017.

== Language ==
The traditional language is known as Inuvialuktun and it is made up of three or four dialects. Uummarmiutun, spoken by the Uummarmiut of Aklavik and Inuvik, is an Iñupiaq dialect but is usually associated with Inuvialuktun. Sallirmiutun (formerly Siglitun) is spoken by the Siglit of Sachs Harbour, Paulatuk, Tuktoyaktuk and Inuvik. Kangiryuarmiutun is used by the Kangiryuarmiut of Ulukhaktok. Kangiryuarmiutun is essentially the same as Inuinnaqtun which is also used in the Nunavut communities of Kugluktuk, Bathurst Inlet and Cambridge Bay. Natsilingmiutut used by the Netsilik of Gjoa Haven, Taloyoak, Kugaaruk and Naujaat in Nunavut. Uummarmiutun, Siglitun and Inuinnaqtun (Kangiryuarmiutun) are all written using Latin script while Natsilingmiutut is written in Inuktitut syllabics.

== Culture ==
Kitigaaryuit is a former Inuvialuit settlement. It was the traditional territory of the Kitigaaryungmiut. The site, which is situated near the junction of the Mackenzie River's East Channel and Kugmallit Bay, encompasses the villages of Kitigaaryuk and Tchenerark, which are located on a small island, and the adjacent village of Kuugaatchiaq, located on the mainland to the west of the island.

Herschel Island, which is uninhabited, is part of the ISR although in Yukon and was traditionally occupied and used by the Inuvialuit. The island is an important part of Inuvialuit culture and the people still visit the island to hunt and fish. At one time Herschel Island was inhabited by Paleo-Eskimo groups followed by Thule people, and finally the Inuvialuit, but in the latter half of the 20th century the population had migrated to government communities in the NWT.

Tarium Niryutait, is a marine protected area (MPA) located in the coastal areas of the Yukon and Northwest Territories in Canada. It is located within the ISR and was the first Arctic MPA established in Canada. The MPA was established with the goal of protecting beluga whales and the biodiversity of other bird and fish species and their habitats.

Year-round, Inuvialuit hunt caribou from the Cape Bathurst and Bluenose herds, and have also shared the Porcupine herd with the Gwichʼin. There has been some tension between the Inuvialuit and the Gwichʼin over caribou hunting. Other activities are seasonal:

- Spring: fishing, geese hunting, grizzly hunting
- Summer: whaling, fishing, gathering berries, roots and medicinal plants
- Autumn: fishing, sealing, geese hunting, and plant gathering
- Winter: fishing, sealing, polar bear hunting

Traditional Inuit games include:

- akimuq: high kick game
- ayahaaq: string game
- iglukisaaq: juggling rocks
- mak: played by trying to make a person laugh
- napataak: darts; played with a wooden handle and sharp nail

== Communities ==
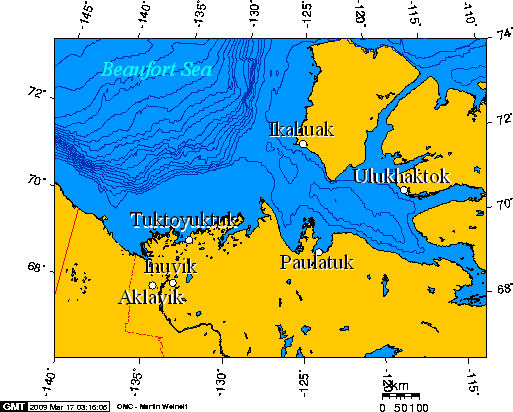
Principal Inuvialuit communities

Inuvik, located on the East Channel of the Mackenzie Delta, approximately 100 km (62 mi) from the Arctic Ocean, is the region's administrative centre, home to the Inuvialuit Regional Corporation. The only other inland community, Aklavik, is located on the Peel Channel.

Hunting, fishing and trapping are the major economic activities of Paulatuk, in Amundsen Gulf's Darnley Bay, and Sachs Harbour, the only permanent settlement on Banks Island.

Tuktoyaktuk, formerly known as "Port Brabant", is set on Kugmallit Bay, near the Mackenzie River Delta. It has the only deepwater port in the ISR.

Ulukhaktok, formerly known as "Holman", is located on the west coast of Victoria Island. Printmaking has taken over as the primary source of income in recent years.

Community	Traditional name	Electoral district	Population (2021 Canadian census)								
Community	Traditional name	Electoral district	Total 2021	Total 2016	% change	Inuvialuit	% of total	First Nations	Métis	Multiple Indigenous (Note: Includes Indigenous responses and those not included elsewhere.)	Non Indigenous
Aklavik	Akłarvik (Note: Barrenground grizzly place)	Mackenzie Delta	536	590	-9.2%	320	59.7%	130	25	15	45
Inuvik	Inuuvik (Note: Place of man)	Boot Lake / Twin Lakes	3,137	3,243	-3.3%	1,265	40.3%	520	115	95	1,070
Paulatuk	Paulatuuq (Note: Place of coal)	Nunakput	298	265	12.5%	270	90.6%	0	0	0	15
Sachs Harbour	Ikaahuk (Note: Place to which you cross)	Nunakput	104	103	1.0%	95	91.3%	0	0	0	10
Tuktoyaktuk	Tuktuujaqrtuuq (Note: Looks like a caribou. Formerly known as Port Brabant, it became the first community in Canada to reclaim its original name.)	Nunakput	937	898	4.3%	815	87%	10	0	95	70
Ulukhaktok	Ulukhaqtuuq (Note: Where there is material for ulus. Renamed from Holman on 1 April 2006)	Nunakput	408	396	3.0%	380	93.1%	0	0	0	20

The area covered by the Inuvialuit Settlement Region is 435,000 km (270,000 mi), including 90,650 km^{2} (35,000 sq mi) of land and 12,980 km^{2} (5,010 sq mi) of subsurface mineral rights. Aklavik (Aklavik First Nation, Ehdiitat Gwich'in Council) and Inuvik (Inuvik Native Band, Nihtat Gwich'in Council) are shared with the Gwichʼin people, who are represented by the Gwich'in Tribal Council.
