= Inuvialuktun =

Inuit language varieties spoken in Canada

- Native to: Canada
- Region: Northwest Territories, Nunavut
- Ethnicity: 3,110 Inuvialuit
- Native speakers: 680, 22% of ethnic population (2016 census)
- Language family: Eskaleut: Eskaleut; Inuit; Inuvialuktun
- Early forms: Proto-Eskaleut: Proto-Eskimoan; Proto-Inuit
- Dialects: Siglitun (Sallirmiutun); Inuinnaqtun; Natsilingmiutut; Uummarmiutun; Kangiryuarmiutun
- Writing system: Latin script, Syllabics

Official status
- Official language in: Northwest Territories, Nunavut
- Regulated by: Inuvialuit Cultural Centre and Inuit Tapiriit Kanatami

Language codes
- ISO 639-1: iu
- ISO 639-2: iku Inuktitut
- ISO 639-3: ikt Inuinnaqtun, Western Canadian Inuktitut
- Glottolog: west2618 Western Canadian Inuktitut

Inu- ᐃᓄ- / nuna ᓄᓇ "person" / "land"
- Person: Inuvialuk
- People: Inuvialuit
- Language: Inuvialuktun; Ujjiqsuuraq
- Country: Inuvialuit Nunangit, Inuit Nunangat ᐃᓄᐃᑦ ᓄᓇᖓᑦ

Inuvialuktun (part of Western Canadian Inuit / Inuktitut / Inuktut / Inuktun) comprises several Inuit language varieties spoken in the northern Northwest Territories by Canadian Inuit who call themselves Inuvialuit. Some dialects and sub-dialects are also spoken in Nunavut.

== Distribution and varieties ==
Map of Inuit languages and dialects

Inuvialuktun is spoken by the Inuit of the Mackenzie River delta, Banks Island, part of Victoria Island and the Arctic Ocean coast of the Northwest Territories – the lands of the Inuvialuit Settlement Region. It was traditionally subsumed under a broader Inuktitut. Rather than a coherent language, Inuvialuktun is a politically motivated grouping of three quite distinct and separate varieties. It consists of Sallirmiutun (formerly Siglitun; Inuvialuktun proper), the Kangiryuarmiutun dialect of Inuinnaqtun on Victoria Island in the East and the Uummarmiutun dialect of Iñupiaq around Inuvik and Aklavik in the West.

Inuvialuktun, Inuinnaqtun and Inuktitut constitute three of the eleven official languages of the Northwest Territories. Inuinnaqtun is also official alongside Inuktitut in Nunavut.

The Inuvialuktun dialects are seriously endangered, as English has in recent years become the common language of the community. Surveys of Inuktitut usage in the NWT vary, but all agree that usage is not vigorous. According to Statistics Canada's 2016 Census 680 (22%) of the 3,110 Inuvialuit speak any form of Inuktitut, and 550 (18%) use it at home. Considering the large number of non-Inuit living in Inuvialuit areas and the lack of a single common dialect among the already reduced number of speakers, the future of the Inuit language in the NWT appears bleak.

Map of Inuvialuktun dialects spoken across the Canadian Arctic

== History ==
Before the 20th century, the Inuvialuit Settlement Region was primarily inhabited by Siglit Inuit, who spoke Siglitun, but in the second half of the 19th century, their numbers were dramatically reduced by the introduction of new diseases. Inuit from Alaska moved into traditionally Siglit areas in the 1910s and 1920s, enticed in part by renewed demand for furs from the Hudson's Bay Company. These Inuit are called Uummarmiut – which means people of the green trees – in reference to their settlements near the tree line. Originally, there was an intense dislike between the Siglit and the Uummarmiut, but these differences have faded over the years, and the two communities are thoroughly intermixed these days.

== Phonology ==
Most Inuit languages have fifteen consonants and three vowel qualities (with phonemic length distinctions for each). Although Inupiatun and Qawiaraq have retroflex consonants, retroflexes have otherwise disappeared in all the Canadian and Greenlandic dialects.

== Writing system ==
Inuvialuktun and Inuinnaqtun are written in a Latin alphabet and have no tradition of Inuktitut syllabics. However, the dialects spoken in Nunavut, east of the Inuinnaqtun region use syllabics.

== Dialects ==
The Inuvialuktun dialects are seriously endangered, as English has in recent years become the common language of the community. Surveys of Inuktitut usage in the NWT vary, but all agree that usage is not vigorous. According to the Inuvialuit Cultural Resource Centre, only 10% of the roughly 4,000 Inuvialuit speak any form of Inuktitut, and only 4% use it at home. Statistics Canada's 2001 Census report is only slightly better, reporting 765 self-identified Inuktitut speakers out of a self-reported Inuvialuit population of 3,905. Considering the large number of non-Inuit living in Inuvialuit areas and the lack of a single common dialect among the already reduced number of speakers, the future of the Inuit language in the NWT appears bleak.

From east to west, the dialects are:

- Iglulingmiut or North Baffin, spoken on western Baffin Island (contrast South Baffin dialect.)
- Aivilingmiutut or Aivilik on the northern Hudson Bay shore of the Kivalliq Region
- Kivallirmiutut or Kivalliq or Caribou on the southern Hudson Bay shore of the Kivalliq Region
- Natsilingmiutut or Netsilik consists of three subdialects: Natsilik proper, Arviligjuaq, Utkuhiksalik
- Inuinnaqtun consists of four subdialects: Kangiryuarmiutun, Kugluktuk, Bathurst, Cambridge. The Kangiryuarmiutun subdialect is spoken in the small community of Ulukhaktok. Essentially the same as Natsilingmiutut.
- Siglitun was, until the 1980s, believed to be extinct, but it is still spoken by people in Paulatuk, Sachs Harbour and Tuktoyaktuk.

The Inuvialuk dialects spoken in Nunavut (that is, Iglulingmiut, Aivilingmiutut, Kivallirmiutut, and eastern Natsilingmiutut) are often counted as Inuktitut, and the government of the NWT only recognizes Inuinnaqtun and Inuvialuktun. In addition, Uummarmiutun, the dialect of the Uummarmiut which is essentially identical to the Inupiatun dialect spoken in Alaska and so considered an Inupiat language, has conventionally been grouped with Inuvialuktun because it's spoken in the Inuvialuit Settlement Region of the NWT. Uummarmiutun is found in the communities of Inuvik and Aklavik.

== Example phrases ==
English	Inuvialuktun	pronunciation
Hello	Atitu	/atitu/
Good Bye	Ilaannilu/Qakugulu	/ilaːnːilu/ / /qakuɡulu/
Thank you	Quyanainni	/qujanainːi/
You are welcome	Amiunniin	/amiunːiːn/
How are you?	Qanuq itpin?	/qanuq itpin/
I am fine	Nakuyumi/Nakuyumi assi	/nakujumi asːi/
Good morning	Ublaami	/ublaːmi/
Yes	Ii	/iː/
No	Naaggai	/naːɡːai/
It's cold! Brrr!	Alaappa!	/alaːpːa/
*Gasp* (an expression used when alarmed or fearful)	Alii	/aliː/
See you later	Anaqanaallu	/anaqanaːlːu/
Wow/Awesome	Aqqali	/aqːali/
Listen!	Ata!	/ata/
See you, too	Ilaanniptauq	/ilaːnːiptauq/
It is like this	Imaaniittuaq	/imaːniːtːuaq/
Like this	Imanna	/imanːa/
Whose?	Kia?	/kia/
Who is this?	Kina una?	/kina una/
Where?	Nani?/Naung?/Sumi?	/nani/ / /nauŋ/ / /sumi/
Where are you from?	Nakinngaaqpin?/Sumiutauvin?	/nakiŋːaːqpin/ / /sumiutauvin/}
How much does it cost?	Qanuq akitutigivaa?	/qanuq akitutiɡivaː/
How old is he/she?	Qanuq ukiuqtutigiva?	/qanuq ukiututiɡiva/
What do you call it?	Qanuq taivakpiung?	/qanuq taivakpiuŋ/
What is the time?	Sumukpaung?	/sumukpauŋ/
What for?	Suksaq?	/suksaq/
Why? Or how come?	Suuq?	/suːq/
What?	Suva?/Suna?	/suva/~/suna/
Doesn't matter/It is ok	Sunngittuq	/suŋːitːuq/
What are you doing?	Suvin?	/suvin/
It can't be helped! Too bad.	Qanurviituq!	/qanuʁviːtuq/
in fact, actually	Nutim	[nutim]
Do it again!	Pipsaarung!	[pipsaːʁuŋ]
Go ahead and do it	Piung	[piuŋ]
It is cold out!	Qiqauniqtuaq	/qiqauniqtuaq/
Christmas	Qitchirvik	/qittʃiʁviq/
Candy	Uqummiaqataaq	[/uqumːiaqataːq/
Play music	Atuqtuuyaqtuaq	/atuqtuːjaqtuaq/
Drum dancing	Qilaun/Qilausiyaqtuaq	/qilaun/ / /qilausijaqtuaq/
Church	Angaadjuvik	/aŋaːdʒuvik/
Bell	Aviluraun	/aviluʁaun/
Jewels	Savaqutit	/savaqutit/
Eskimo ice cream	Akutuq	/akutaq/
That's it!	Taima!	/taima/

Siglitun Inuvialuktun snow terms	English meaning
Apiqaun	first snow layer in autumn that stays
Apusiqqaun	first fall of snow
Aqiuyaq	small, fresh snowdrift
Masak	waterlogged snow
Mauyaa	deep, soft snow
Minguliruqtuaq	blowing wet snow
Piangnaq	good snow conditions for sledge travel
