= Aklavik =

Aklavik Akłarvik
- Hamlet
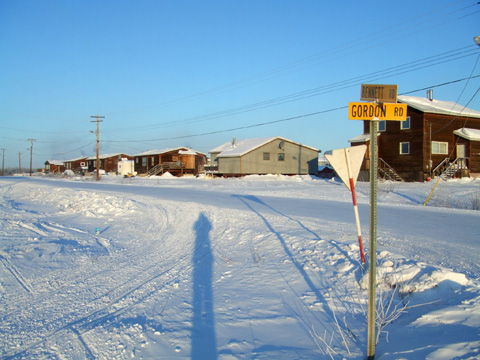
- Aklavik in early-February 2008
- Motto: Never Say Die
- Location within Northwest Territories Location within Canada
- Coordinates: 68°13′13″N 135°00′42″W
- Country: Canada
- Territory: Northwest Territories
- Region: Inuvik Region
- Constituency: Mackenzie Delta
- Census division: Region 1
- Incorporated (hamlet): 1 January 1974

Government
  - Mayor: Jordan McLeod
  - Senior Administrative Officer: Fred Behrens
  - MLA: Frederick Blake Jr.

Area
  - Land: 14.47 km^{2} (5.59 sq mi)
- Elevation: 6 m (20 ft)

Population (2016)
  - Total: 590
  - Density: 40.8/km^{2} (106/sq mi)
- Time zone: UTC−06:00 (Northwest Territories Time)
- Canadian Postal code: X0E 0A0
- Area code: 867
- Telephone exchange: 375 878 978
  - Living cost: 162.5^{A}
  - Food price index: 170.5^{B}
- Website: aklavik.ca
- Sources: Department of Municipal and Community Affairs; Prince of Wales Northern Heritage Centre; Canada Flight Supplement^A2013 figure based on Edmonton = 100^B2015 figure based on Yellowknife = 100; Elevation at airport

Aklavik /əˈklævɪk/ (Inuvialuktun: Akłarvik) (from the Inuvialuktun meaning barrenground grizzly place) is a hamlet located in the Inuvik Region of the Northwest Territories, Canada. Until 1961, with a population over 1,500, the community served as the regional administrative centre for the territorial government.

Because of repeated flooding in this area, the government developed Inuvik 63 km (39 mi) to the east. It was meant to entirely replace Aklavik, but many of the residents of the original community persevered and kept Aklavik going. Its 2018 population was 623. As of 2018, the hamlet's mayor is Andrew Charlie.

== History ==
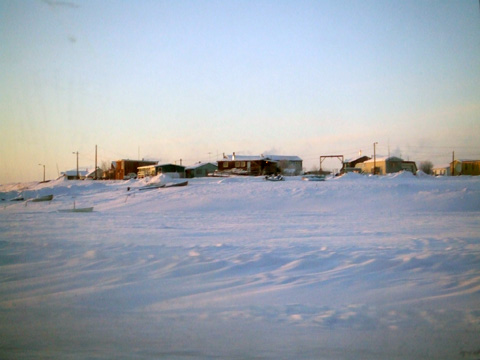
The community

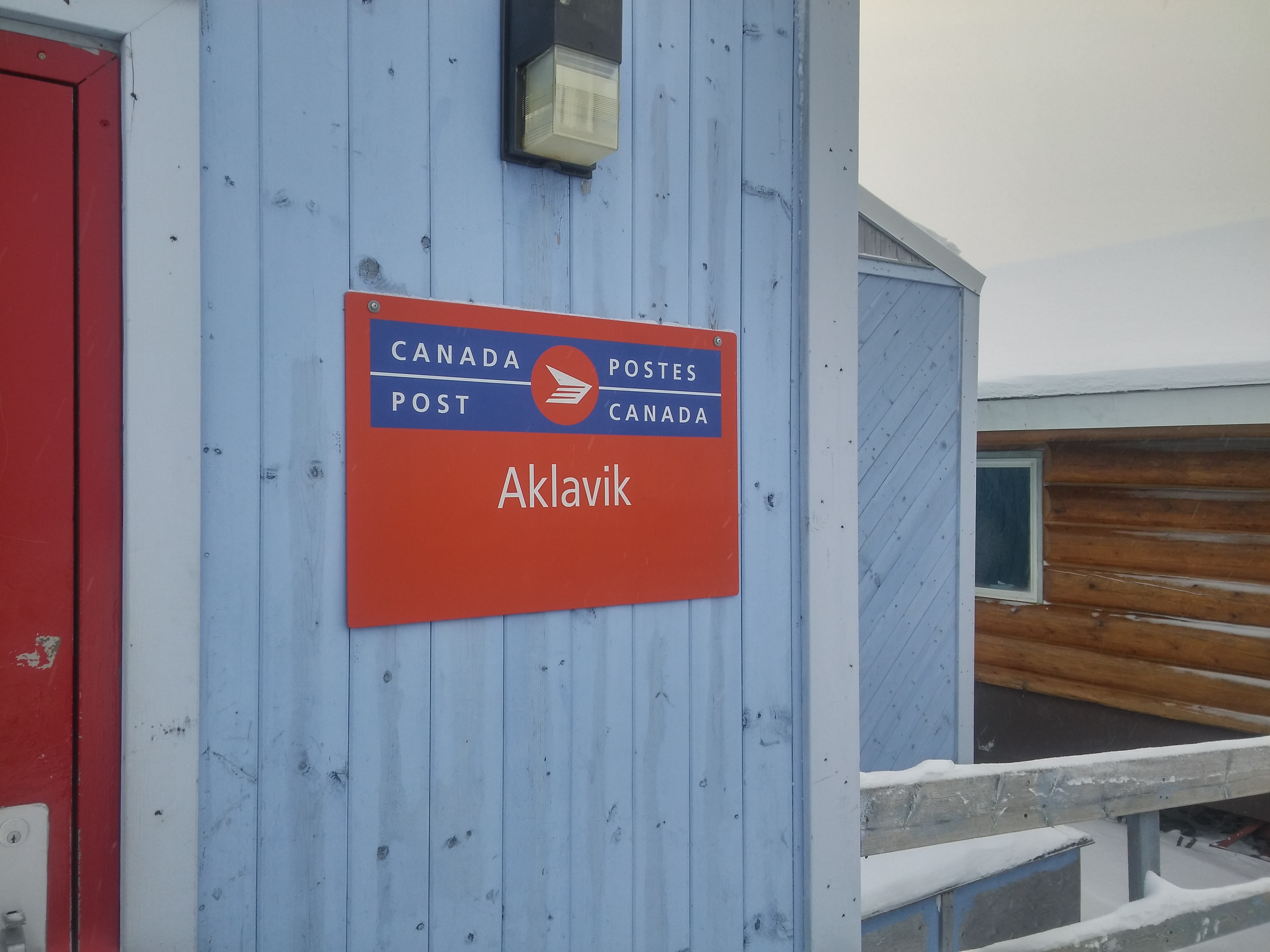
Canada Post office in Aklavik

Aklavik began to develop in the early 1900s after the Hudson's Bay Company opened a trading post in 1912. The Roman Catholic Church later established a mission here in 1926. Located on the Peel Channel, the community became a transportation hub in the Mackenzie. It was in a good trapping area.

Aklavik became part of the Northwest Territories and Yukon Radio System (NWT&Y) in October 1925. The NWT&Y system, a pioneer system, was critical in providing communications in Canada's North. It was operated by the Royal Canadian Corps of Signals (RC Sigs). In Aklavik, besides providing services to the general population, NWT&Y also provided communication for any aircraft that overflew the site, with or without radio. An aircraft without radio that was passing over one of these stations and not planning to land, would fly very low over the station so that it could be identified and the date and time of its passing could be recorded. The call sign for the NWT&Y station in Aklavik was VEF.

In 1931, Albert Johnson, also known as the "Mad Trapper of Rat River", moved into the area. A complaint was made to the Royal Canadian Mounted Police (RCMP) post in Aklavik and the two members attempted, unsuccessfully, to talk with him concerning trapline tampering. A few days later, after gaining a search warrant, they tried again to talk with him, but Johnson fatally shot one of the RCMP and fled. A 42-day manhunt began, ending with Johnson's death. These events are considered to have been the catalyst for introducing the airplane and communications radio as tools to help track a person. Museums dedicated to Albert Johnson can be found in Aklavik and in Fort Smith.

In December 1946, radio station "CHAK" went on the air at Aklavik. The AK in the call sign was the first and last letters of the location. Built and initially operated by WO2 R.A. (Red) McLeod of the RC Sigs, the station was a voluntary operation serving the Mackenzie River delta. It initially had 30 watts of power, later upgraded to 100 watts, and operated on 1490 kHz. It received its license in 1947.

In 1949, the Royal Canadian Navy established a signals intelligence station in Aklavik. It remained operational until March 1961. After it closed down, operations were moved to a newly built station in Inuvik.

By the 1950s the community had developed to more than 1,600 people. However, the Peel Channel was subject to flooding, and the river banks were being washed away. Due to the flooding, the Federal Government built a new community at what is now Inuvik, and intended to close Aklavik.

In the 1960s, the principal of Aklavik's school, A. J. (Moose) Kerr, started a committee to help save the community. The efforts were successful and the community has survived. The local school is named for him.

== Today ==
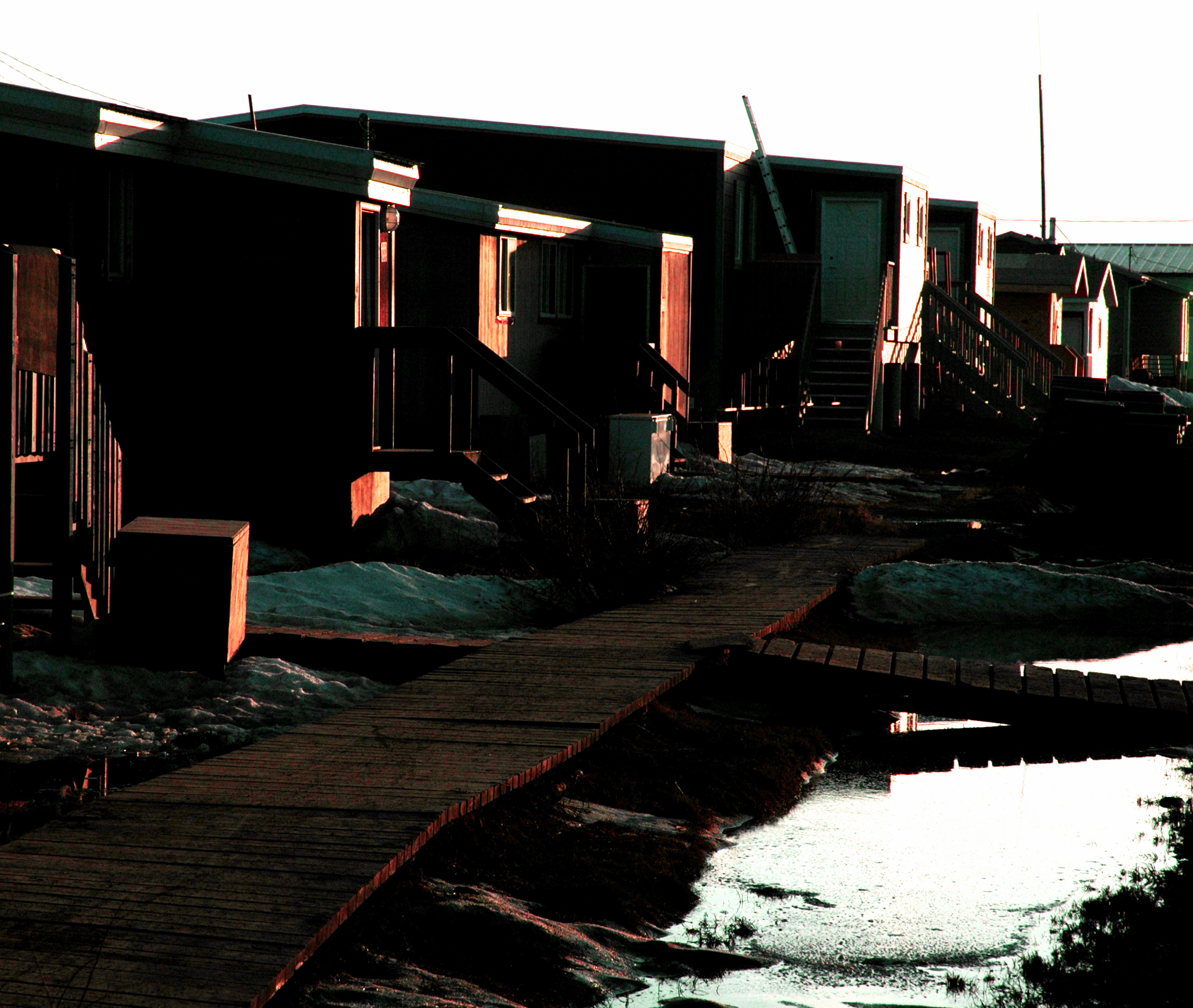
Sidewalks in Aklavik

The community has a school with approximately 150 students from Kindergarten to Grade 12 (K-12). Aurora College provides adult education at the Community Learning Centre.

There are three general stores: the Aklavik General Store, Stantons, and the Northern Store operated by The North West Company. The community has a three-person RCMP detachment, a health centre with four nurses, a Canada Post outlet, the Aklavik Lodge and the Aklavik Inn (Bessie's Boarding House) for visitor accommodation, and two taxi companies.

Like most northern communities, Aklavik has a community hall, and a gymnasium that is attached to the school. Uncommonly it also has a swimming pool.

The community is served only by air, via the Aklavik/Freddie Carmichael Airport, and by winter ice road directly from Inuvik across the streams of the Mackenzie Delta. When the river is open, usually June to September, the Aklavik Water Aerodrome is available for float planes.

== Land claims ==
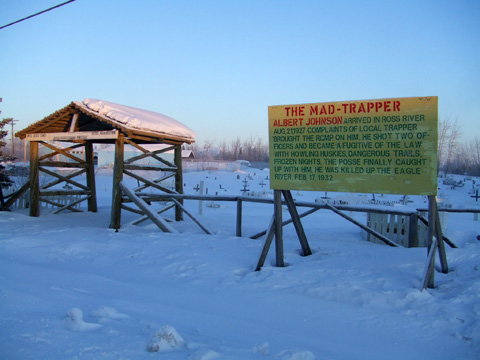
Mad Trapper grave

Aklavik is one of the few places in the NWT to be included within two different land claims areas, being part of the Inuvialuit Settlement Region and the Gwich'in Settlement Region.

The Inuvialuit, whose claim, the Inuvialuit Final Agreement was settled in 1984, are represented by the Aklavik Community Corporation. It forms part of the Inuvialuit Regional Corporation.

The Gwich'in of Aklavik are covered under the Gwich'in Comprehensive Land Claim Agreement, signed in 1992, and are represented by the Ehdiitat Gwich'in Council, as well as the Aklavik First Nation. The Ehdiitat Gwich'in Council in turn forms part of the Gwich'in Tribal Council.

== Indigenous peoples ==
The Inuvialuit of Aklavik, an Inuit, are primarily Uummarmiut. They are descendants of the Nunamiut, Inupiat people who migrated from Alaska in the early 20th century. Although at first antagonistic with the local Siglit, the peoples later intermarried. The Siglit suffered high mortality from new infectious diseases. They speak Uummarmiutun, which is almost identical to Inupiaq language, but is grouped with Inuvialuktun.

The Gwich'in, a First Nations people, are an Arctic-dwelling Dene people who inhabit parts of Alaska, and Yukon and the NWT in Canada. They speak the Gwichʼin language, which is part of the Athabaskan language family.

Both Inuvialuktun and Gwichʼin are official languages of the NWT, and in 2009 19.2% of the Aboriginal population spoke at least one Native language.

== Climate ==
Aklavik has a subarctic climate (Dfc), typical of Canada's Arctic, with mild summers and cold winters lasting most of the year with highs regularly below zero. Freezing can occur at any time of the year.

Climate data for Aklavik (Aklavik/Freddie Carmichael Airport) Climate ID: 2200105 / 2200100; coordinates 63°13′24″N 135°00′20″W; elevation: 6.4 m (21 ft); 1991–2020 normals, extremes 1926-present
Month	Jan	Feb	Mar	Apr	May	Jun	Jul	Aug	Sep	Oct	Nov	Dec	Year
Record high humidex	6.1	3.8	8.6	12.8	24.6	34.6	35.5	33.8	26.5	16.4	4.3	1.6	35.5
Record high °C (°F)	9.5 (49.1)	4.3 (39.7)	11.0 (51.8)	15.4 (59.7)	23.7 (74.7)	31.8 (89.2)	31.7 (89.1)	31.9 (89.4)	27.6 (81.7)	17.0 (62.6)	5.9 (42.6)	11.2 (52.2)	31.9 (89.4)
Mean daily maximum °C (°F)	−22.6 (−8.7)	−21.5 (−6.7)	−16.1 (3.0)	−5.4 (22.3)	5.2 (41.4)	16.6 (61.9)	18.7 (65.7)	15.3 (59.5)	7.4 (45.3)	−4.2 (24.4)	−15.0 (5.0)	−21.2 (−6.2)	−3.6 (25.5)
Daily mean °C (°F)	−26.3 (−15.3)	−25.5 (−13.9)	−21.0 (−5.8)	−11.4 (11.5)	0.6 (33.1)	11.5 (52.7)	—	—	4.4 (39.9)	−6.7 (19.9)	−18.2 (−0.8)	−24.4 (−11.9)	—
Mean daily minimum °C (°F)	−30.3 (−22.5)	−29.5 (−21.1)	−26.4 (−15.5)	−17.0 (1.4)	−4.0 (24.8)	6.2 (43.2)	—	—	1.4 (34.5)	−9.0 (15.8)	−21.6 (−6.9)	−28.0 (−18.4)	—
Record low °C (°F)	−48.5 (−55.3)	−45.8 (−50.4)	−47.8 (−54.0)	−34.8 (−30.6)	−26.5 (−15.7)	−6.4 (20.5)	0.6 (33.1)	−2.8 (27.0)	−11.0 (12.2)	−35.1 (−31.2)	−39.5 (−39.1)	−44.5 (−48.1)	−48.5 (−55.3)
Record low wind chill	−49.6	−51.6	−47.9	−35.1	−21.3	−8.2	0.0	−6.7	−8.7	−25.9	−46.1	−52.2	−52.2
Average precipitation mm (inches)	15.9 (0.63)	12.2 (0.48)	13.2 (0.52)	8.8 (0.35)	12.6 (0.50)	21.9 (0.86)	—	—	33.5 (1.32)	—	—	—	—
Average rainfall mm (inches)	0.0 (0.0)	0.0 (0.0)	0.0 (0.0)	0.1 (0.00)	5.3 (0.21)	21.0 (0.83)	—	—	26 (1.0)	0.8 (0.03)	0.0 (0.0)	0.0 (0.0)	—
Average snowfall cm (inches)	15.9 (6.3)	12.2 (4.8)	13.2 (5.2)	8.7 (3.4)	7.5 (3.0)	0.8 (0.3)	0.0 (0.0)	0.4 (0.2)	8.9 (3.5)	—	—	—	—
Average precipitation days (≥ 0.2 mm)	9.2	9.0	7.4	5.4	6.1	7.6	—	—	13.5	—	—	—	—
Average rainy days (≥ 0.2 mm)	0.0	0.0	0.0	0.06	2.5	7.3	—	—	10.8	0.67	0.0	0.0	—
Average snowy days (≥ 0.2 cm)	9.2	9.0	7.4	5.4	3.8	0.35	0.0	0.06	2.8	—	—	—	—
Source: Environment and Climate Change Canada

== Demographics ==
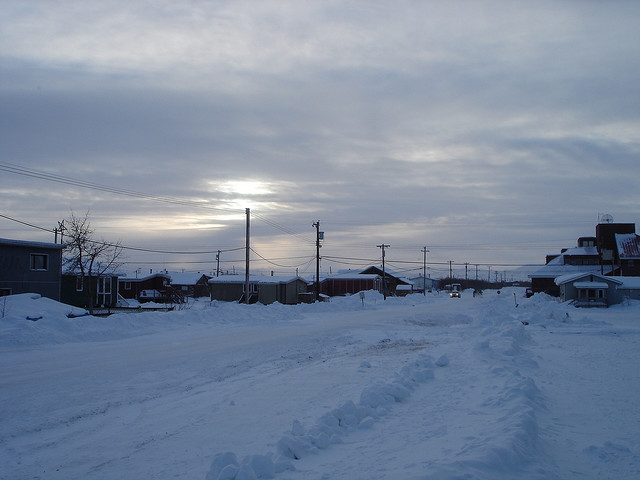
The community

Federal census population history of Aklavik
Year	Pop.	±%
1971	661	—
1976	781	+18.2%
1981	721	−7.7%
1986	763	+5.8%
1991	801	+5.0%
1996	727	−9.2%
2001	632	−13.1%
2006	594	−6.0%
2011	633	+6.6%
2016	590	−6.8%
2021	536	−9.2%
Source: Statistics Canada

Annual population estimates

Year	Pop.	±%
1996	756	—
1997	739	−2.2%
1998	736	−0.4%
1999	714	−3.0%
2000	706	−1.1%
2001	687	−2.7%
2002	678	−1.3%
2003	646	−4.7%
2004	623	−3.6%
2005	632	+1.4%
2006	616	−2.5%

Year	Pop.	±%
2007	613	−0.5%
2008	627	+2.3%
2009	618	−1.4%
2010	641	+3.7%
2011	656	+2.3%
2012	658	+0.3%
2013	670	+1.8%
2014	654	−2.4%
2015	664	+1.5%
2016	667	+0.5%
2017	656	−1.6%

Sources: NWT Bureau of Statistics (2001–2017)

In the 2021 Census of Population conducted by Statistics Canada, Aklavik had a population of 536 living in 216 of its 274 total private dwellings, a change of −9.2% from its 2016 population of 590. With a land area of 12.29 km^{2} (4.75 sq mi), it had a population density of 43.6/km^{2} (113.0/sq mi) in 2021.

Like most other NWT communities the majority of the population, 93.2%, is Indigenous. However, unlike other communities Aklavik has a large number of both First Nations, 33.9%, and Inuit, 53.4%, along with a small number of Métis, 4.2%, and non-Aboriginal, 8.5%.

From 2006 to 2014 there were 94 births and 42 deaths in the community. In 2017, 14% of residents were 9 or under, 6.9% were from 10 to 14 years old, 14.2% were from 15 to 24, 30.9% were from 25 to 44, 20% were from 45 to 59, and 14% were 60 or older. At the 2016 census the median age in Aklavik was 31.8, compared to 34.0 for the NWT and 41.2 for Canada as a whole.

The crime rate for 2016 was 70.9 (per 1,000 persons) for violent crimes, and 200.9 (per 1,000 persons) for property crimes, both numbers below the average for the NWT of 78.4 and 206.6. In 2015 the average income in the hamlet was C$33,826, compared to $61,909 for the NWT, and the average income for a family was $80,200, compared to $133,754 for the NWT, with 20.0% of all families earning less than $30,000.

== Notable people ==
- Frank Carmichael, trapper and former MLA for Mackenzie West and Mackenzie Delta
- Nellie Cournoyea, former Premier of the Northwest Territories
- John Hagen, surgeon
- Glenna Hansen, former Commissioner of the Northwest Territories
- Robert C. McLeod, MLA for Inuvik Twin Lakes
- Abe Okpik, first Inuk on the Legislative Assembly of the Northwest Territories and spearheaded Project Surname to replace disc numbers
- Rick Rivet, Sahtu–Métis Neo-Expressionist painter
- Vince Steen, former MLA for Nunakput
- Willie Thrasher, musician

== See also ==
- List of municipalities in the Northwest Territories
