= Sallirmiutun =

Inuit language dialect

- Siglitun
- Native to: Canada
- Region: Northwest Territories (Canada), as "Inuvialuktun"
- Language family: Eskaleut: Eskimo; Inuit; Inuvialuktun; Sallirmiutun
- Early forms: Proto-Eskimo–Aleut: Proto-Eskimo; Proto-Inuit

Language codes
- ISO 639-3: –
- Glottolog: sigl1242
- Inuit dialects. Siglit is purple.

- Siglitun is classified as Severely Endangered by the UNESCO Atlas of the World's Languages in Danger

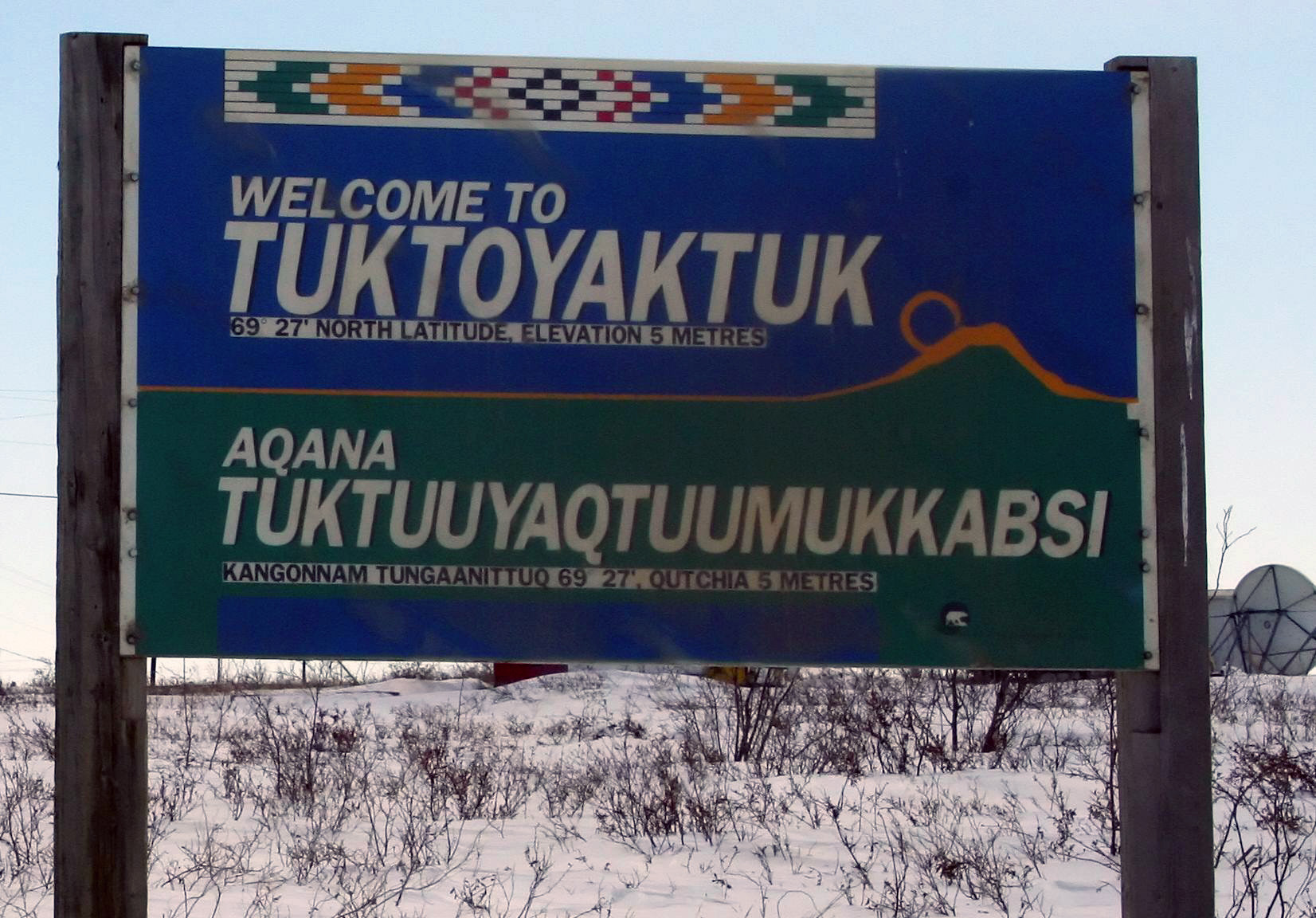
English: Welcome to Tuktoyaktuk Siglitun: Aqana Tuktuuyaqtuumukkabsi

Sallirmiutun (formerly Siglitun) is the dialect of Inuvialuktun spoken by the Siglit, an Inuit group of the Northwest Territories, Canada. It is mainly used in the Inuvialuit communities of Paulatuk, Sachs Harbour and Tuktoyaktuk. Sallirmiutun was once the principal dialect of the Mackenzie River delta, nearby parts of the coast and Arctic Ocean islands, but the number of speakers fell dramatically following outbreaks of new diseases in the 19th century and for many years Sallirmiutun was believed to be completely extinct. It was only in the 1980s that outsiders realised that it was still spoken.

Sallirmiutun means "the language of the people of the coast" referring to the Beaufort Sea. It is the original dialect of the people from Kitigaaryuit.

It is one of the three dialects, along with Kangiryuarmiutun and Uummarmiutun, of Inuit language grouped together under the label Inuvialuktun. In fact, the word Inuvialuktun, meaning "the language of the real people" is a Sallirmiutun dialect word.

== Phonology ==
The following is the phonology of the Siglitun dialect:

=== Vowels ===
	Front	Back
Close	i	u
Open	a	

- Vowel sounds /i u/ can have allophones heard as [ɪ ʊ].

=== Consonants ===
		Labial	Alveolar		Palatal	Velar	Uvular
		Labial	plain	lateral	Palatal	Velar	Uvular
Nasal		m	n			ŋ	
Plosive/ Affricate	voiceless	p	t		tʃ	k	q
Plosive/ Affricate	voiced	b			dʒ		
Fricative		v	s	ɬ	j	ɣ	ʁ
Approximant				l	j		

- /j/ can be heard as either a palatal glide [j] or a fricative [ʝ].

== Vocabulary comparison ==
The comparison of some animal names in the Siglitun dialect of Inuvialuktun language and Uummarmiutun dialect of the Iñupiatun language:

Siglitun	Uummarmiutun	meaning
siksik	hikȓik	ground squirrel
qugyuk	qugȓuk	tundra swan
ugyuk	ugȓuk	bearded seal
tigiaqpak	itigiaqpak	mink
qavviasiaq	qavviatchiaq	marten
tigiaq	itiriaq	weasel
tatidjgaq	tatiȓgaq	sandhill crane
ivugaqpak	kuȓugaqpak	mallard
aqidjgiq	aqȓgiq	willow ptarmigan
isun’ngaq	ihun’ngaq	jaeger
piqtusiraq	pamiuquuq	otter
