= Inuit languages =

Branch of the Eskaleut language family

Inuit
- Geographic distribution: Alaska, Nunavut, Northwest Territories (Inuvialuit Settlement Region), Quebec (Nunavik), Labrador (Nunatsiavut, NunatuKavut), Greenland
- Ethnicity: Inuit
- Native speakers: est. 100,000
- Linguistic classification: Eskaleut: Eskimo; Inuit
- Proto-language: Proto-Inuit
- Subdivisions: Iñupiaq (Inupiatun/Inupiat); Inuvialuktun (Western Canadian Inuit, Kivallirmiutut, Aivilingmiutut, Qikiqtaaluk-Uannanganii); Inuktitut (Qikiqtaaluk-Nigiani, Nunavimmiutitut, Nunatsiavummiutut); Kalaallisut (Greenlandic)

Language codes
- Glottolog: inui1246

- Maps of Inuit oral languages (top) and Greenlandic and Inuit Sign Languages (bottom)

The Inuit languages are a closely related group of Indigenous North American languages traditionally spoken across the North American Arctic and the adjacent subarctic regions as far south as Labrador. The Inuit languages are one of the two branches of the Eskaleut (Eskimoan) language family, the other being the Yupik languages, which are spoken in Alaska and the Russian Far East. Most Inuit live in one of three countries: Greenland, a self-governing territory within the Kingdom of Denmark; Canada, specifically in Nunavut, the Inuvialuit Settlement Region of the Northwest Territories, the Nunavik region of Quebec, and the Nunatsiavut and NunatuKavut regions of Labrador; and the United States, specifically in northern and western Alaska.

The total population of Inuit speaking their traditional languages is difficult to assess with precision, since most counts rely on self-reported census data that may not accurately reflect usage or competence. Greenland census estimates place the number of Inuit language speakers there at roughly 50,000. According to the 2021 Canadian census, the Inuit population of Canada is 70,540, of which 33,790 report Inuktut (collective name for Inuit languages in Canada) as their first language. Greenland and Canada account for the bulk of Inuit speakers, although about 7,500 Alaskans speak some variety of an Inuit language out of a total population of over 13,000 Inuit. An estimated 7,000 Greenlandic Inuit live in Denmark, the largest group outside of North America. Thus, the total population of Inuit speakers is about 100,000 people.

Although they are from two different language families, Inuit also speak both Inuit Sign Language (IUR) in Canada and Greenlandic Sign Language, a dialect of Danish Sign Language, in Greenland. It is unknown to academia if the two sign languages are related. It also remains unknown to what extent IUR is spoken across Inuit Nunangat. Finally, even though IUR is slowly being replaced by American Sign Language, there are efforts to support the native sign language underway.

== Nomenclature ==
The traditional Inuit language is a system of closely interrelated dialects that are not readily comprehensible from one end of the Inuit world to the other; some people do not think of it as a single language but rather a group of languages. However, there are no clear criteria for breaking the Inuit language into specific member languages since it forms a dialect continuum. Each band of Inuit understands its neighbours, and most likely its neighbours' neighbours; but at some remove, comprehensibility drops to a very low level.

As a result, Inuit in different places use different words for its own variants and for the entire group of languages, and this ambiguity has been carried into other languages, creating a great deal of confusion over what labels should be applied to it.

In Greenland the official form of Inuit language, and the official language of the state, is called Kalaallisut. In other languages, it is often called Greenlandic or some cognate term. The Inuit languages of Alaska are called Iñupiatun, but the variants of the Seward Peninsula are distinguished from the other Alaskan variants by calling them Qawiaraq, or for some dialects, Bering Strait Inupiatun.

In Canada, the word Inuktitut is routinely used to refer to all Canadian variants of the Inuit traditional language, and it is under that name that it is recognised as one of the official languages of Nunavut and the Northwest Territories. However, one of the variants of western Nunavut, and the eastern Northwest Territories, is called Inuinnaqtun to distinguish itself from the dialects of eastern Canada, while the variants of the Northwest Territories are sometimes called Inuvialuktun and have in the past sometimes been called Inuktun. In those dialects, the name is sometimes rendered as Inuktitun to reflect dialectal differences in pronunciation. The Inuit language of Quebec is called Inuttitut by its speakers, and often by other people, but this is a minor variation in pronunciation. In Labrador, the language is called Inuttut or, sometimes by the more descriptive name Labradorimiutut. Furthermore, Canadians – both Inuit and non-Inuit – sometimes use the word Inuktitut to refer to all Inuit language variants, including those of Alaska and Greenland.

The phrase "Inuit language" is largely limited to professional discourse, since in each area, there is one or more conventional terms that cover all the local variants; or it is used as a descriptive term in publications where readers cannot necessarily be expected to know the locally used words. In Nunavut the government groups all dialects of Inuktitut and Inuinnaqtun under the term Inuktut. The collective name is used to refer to the languages of Inuit Nunangat. It is used by Inuit Tapiriit Kanatami, the Inuit Circumpolar Council, and the Government of Nunavut throughout Inuit Nunaat and Inuit Nunangat. In Canada, outside of Inuit Nunangat, Inuktut is used by Statistics Canada, who have partnered with the Office of the Commissioner of Indigenous Languages, and use the term throughout the Canadian census.

Although many people refer to the Inuit language as Eskimo language, this is a broad term that also includes the Yupik languages, and is in addition strongly discouraged in Canada and diminishing in usage elsewhere. See the article on Eskimo for more information on this word.

== Classification and history ==
The Inuit languages constitute a branch of the Eskaleut language family. They are closely related to the Yupik languages and more remotely to Aleut. These other languages are all spoken in western Alaska, United States, and eastern Chukotka, Russia. They are not discernibly related to other indigenous languages of the Americas or northeast Asia, although there have been some unsubstantiated proposals that they are distantly related to the Uralic languages of western Siberia and northern Europe, in a proposed Uralo-Siberian grouping, or even to the Indo-European languages as part of a Nostratic superphylum. Some had previously lumped them in with the Paleo-Siberian languages, though that is a geographic rather than a linguistic grouping.

Early forms of the Inuit language are believed to have been spoken by the Thule people, who migrated east from Beringia towards the Arctic Archipelago, which had been occupied by people of the Dorset culture since the beginning of the 2nd millennium. By 1300, the Inuit and their language had reached western Greenland, and finally east Greenland roughly at the same time the Viking colonies in southern Greenland disappeared. It is generally believed that it was during this centuries-long eastward migration that the Inuit language became distinct from the Yupik languages spoken in Western Alaska and Chukotka.

Until 1902, a possible enclave of the Dorset, the Sadlermiut (in modern Inuktitut spelling Sallirmiut), existed on Southampton Island. Almost nothing is known about their language, but the few eyewitness accounts tell of them speaking a "strange dialect". This suggests that they also spoke an Inuit language, but one quite distinct from the forms spoken in Canada today.

The Yupik and Inuit languages are very similar syntactically and morphologically. Their common origin can be seen in a number of cognates:

English	Central Alaskan Yupʼik	Iñupiatun	North Baffin Inuktitut	Kalaallisut
person	yuk	iñuk [iɲuk]	inuk (ᐃᓄᒃ)	inuk
frost	kaneq	kaniq	kaniq (ᑲᓂᖅ)	kaneq
river	kuik	kuuk	kuuk (ᑰᒃ)	kuuk
outside	ellami	siḷami [siʎami]	silami (ᓯᓚᒥ)	silami

The western Alaskan variants retain a large number of features present in proto-Inuit language and in Yup'ik, enough so that they might be classed as Yup'ik languages if they were viewed in isolation from the larger Inuit world.

== Geographic distribution and variants ==
Distribution of Inuit language variants across the Arctic

The Inuit languages are a fairly closely linked set of languages which can be broken up using a number of different criteria. Traditionally, Inuit describe dialect differences by means of place names to describe local idiosyncrasies in language: The dialect of Igloolik versus the dialect of Iqaluit, for example. However, political and sociological divisions are increasingly the principal criteria for describing different variants of the Inuit languages because of their links to different writing systems, literary traditions, schools, media sources and borrowed vocabulary. This makes any partition of the Inuit language somewhat problematic. This article will use labels that try to synthesize linguistic, sociolinguistic and political considerations in splitting up the Inuit dialect spectrum. This scheme is not the only one used or necessarily one used by Inuit themselves, but its labels do try to reflect the usages most seen in popular and technical literature.

In addition to the territories listed below, some 7,000 Greenlandic speakers are reported to live in mainland Denmark, and according to the 2001 census roughly 200 self-reported Inuktitut native speakers regularly live in parts of Canada which are outside traditional Inuit lands.

=== Alaska ===
Of the roughly 13,000 Alaskan Iñupiat, as few as 3,000 may still be able to speak Iñupiaq, with most of them over the age of 40. Alaskan Iñupiat speak three distinct dialects, which have difficult mutual intelligibility:

- Qawiaraq is spoken on the southern side of the Seward Peninsula and the Norton Sound area. In the past it was spoken in Chukotka, particularly Big Diomede Island, but appears to have vanished in Russian areas through assimilation into Yupik, Chukchi and Russian-speaking communities. It is radically different in phonology from other Inuit language variants.
- Iñupiatun (North Slope Iñupiaq) is spoken on the Alaska North Slope and in the Kotzebue Sound area.
- Malimiutun or Malimiut Iñupiatun, which are the variants of the Kotzebue Sound area and the northwest of Alaska .

=== Canada ===
The Inuit languages are official in the Northwest Territories and Nunavut (the dominant language in the latter); have a high level of official support in Nunavik, a semi-autonomous portion of Quebec; and are still spoken in some parts of Labrador. Generally, Canadians refer to all dialects spoken in Canada as Inuktitut, but the terms Inuvialuktun, Inuinnaqtun, and Inuttitut (also called Nunatsiavummiutut, Labradorimiutut or Inuttitut) have some currency in referring to the variants of specific areas.

==== Western Canadian Inuit ====
- Inuvialuktun (from west to east)
  - Uummarmiutun (Canadian Iñupiaq)
  - Sallirmiutun (formerly Siglitun)
  - Inuinnaqtun
    - Kangiryuarmiutun
  - Natsilingmiutut
    - Utkuhiksalik
  - Kivallirmiutut (Kivalliq)
  - Aivilingmiutut (Ailivik)
  - Iglulingmiut (Qikiqtaaluk Uannanganii, sometimes listed under Inuktitut dialects)

==== Eastern Canadian Inuit ====
- Inuktitut
  - Qikiqtaaluk Nigiani
  - Nunavimmiututut
  - Inuttitut (Nunatsiavummiut)

=== Greenland ===
Greenland counts approximately 50,000 speakers of the Inuit languages, over 90% of whom speak west Greenlandic dialects at home.

- Kalaallisut, Greenlandic in English, is the standard dialect and official language of Greenland. This standard national language has been taught to all Greenlanders since schools were established, regardless of their native dialect. It reflects almost exclusively the language of western Greenland and has borrowed a great deal of vocabulary from Danish (in contrast the Canadian and Alaskan Inuit languages have tended to borrow from English, French or Russian). It is written using the Latin script. The dialect of the Upernavik area in northwest Greenland is somewhat different in phonology from the standard dialect.
- Tunumiit oraasiat, Tunumiisut or Tunumiit dialect, often East Greenlandic in other languages). Spoken by Tunumiit, is the dialect of eastern Greenland. It differs sharply from other Inuit language variants and has roughly 3,000 speakers according to Ethnologue.
- Inuktun (or Avanersuarmiutut in Greenlandic) is the dialect of the area around Qaanaaq in northern Greenland. It is sometimes called the Thule dialect or North Greenlandic. This area is the northernmost settlement area of the Inuit and has a relatively small number of speakers, known as . It is reputed to be fairly close to the North Baffin dialect, since a group of migratory Inuit from Baffin Island, today called Inughuit, settled in the area during the 19th and early 20th centuries. It counts under 1,000 speakers according to Ethnologue.

Greenlandic was strongly supported by the Danish Christian mission (conducted by the Danish state church) in Greenland. Several major dictionaries were created, beginning with Paul Egede's Dictionarium Grönlandico-danico-latinum (1750) and culminating with Samuel Kleinschmidt's (1871) Den grønlandske ordbog ('The Greenlandic Dictionary'), which contained a Greenlandic grammatical system that has formed the basis of modern Greenlandic grammar. Together with the fact that until 1925 Danish was not taught in the public schools, these policies had the consequence that Greenlandic has always and continues to enjoy a very strong position in Greenland, both as a spoken as well as written language.

== Phonology and phonetics ==
Eastern Canadian Inuit language variants have fifteen consonants and three vowels (which can be long or short).

Consonants are arranged with five places of articulation: bilabial, alveolar, palatal, velar and uvular; and three manners of articulation: voiceless stops, voiced continuants, and nasals, as well as two additional sounds—voiceless fricatives. The Alaskan dialects have an additional manner of articulation, the retroflex, which was present in proto-Inuit language. Retroflexes have disappeared in all the Canadian and Greenlandic dialects. In Natsilingmiutut, the voiced palatal stop /ɟ/ derives from a former retroflex.

Almost all Inuit language variants have only three basic vowels and make a phonological distinction between short and long forms of all vowels. The only exceptions are at the extreme edges of the Inuit world: parts of Greenland, and in western Alaska.

== Morphology and syntax ==
The Inuit languages, like other Eskaleut languages, have very rich morphological systems in which a succession of different morphemes are added to root words (like verb endings in European languages) to indicate things that, in languages like English, would require several words to express. All Inuit words begin with a root morpheme to which other morphemes are suffixed. The language has hundreds of distinct suffixes, in some dialects as many as 700. The language has a highly regular morphology; although the rules are sometimes very complicated, they do not have exceptions in the sense that English and other Indo-European languages do.

This system makes words very long, and potentially unique. For example, in central Nunavut Inuktitut:

tusaa- -tsiaq- -junnaq- -nngit- -tualuu- -junga
{to hear} well {be able to} not {very much} 1SG.PRES.IND.NSP
I cannot hear very well.

This sort of word construction is pervasive in the Inuit languages and makes them very unlike English. In one large Canadian corpus – the Nunavut Hansard – 92% of all words appear only once, in contrast to a small percentage in most English corpora of similar size. This makes the application of Zipf's law quite difficult in the Inuit language. Furthermore, the notion of a part of speech can be somewhat complicated in the Inuit languages. Fully inflected verbs can be interpreted as nouns. The word ilisaijuq can be interpreted as a fully inflected verb: "he studies", but can also be interpreted as a noun: "student". That said, the meaning is probably obvious to a fluent speaker, when put in context.

The morphology and syntax of the Inuit languages vary to some degree between dialects, and the article Inuit grammar describes primarily central Nunavut dialects, but the basic principles will generally apply to all of them and to some degree to Yupik languages as well.

== Vocabulary ==
=== Toponymy and names ===
Both the names of places and people tend to be highly prosaic when translated. Iqaluit, for example, is simply the plural of the noun iqaluk "fish" ("Arctic char", "salmon" or "trout" depending on dialect). Igloolik (Iglulik) means place with houses, a word that could be interpreted as simply town; Inuvik is place of people; Baffin Island, Qikiqtaaluk in Inuktitut, translates approximately to "big island".

Common native names in Canada include "Ujarak" (rock), "Nuvuk" (headland), "Nasak" (hat, or hood), "Tupiq" or "Tupeq" in Kalaallisut (tent), and "Qajaq" (kayak). Inuit also use animal names, traditionally believing that by using those names, they took on some of the characteristics of that animal: "Nanuq" or "Nanoq" in Kalaallisut (polar bear), "Uqalik" or "Ukaleq" in Kalaallisut (Arctic hare), and "Tiriaq" or "Teriaq" in Kalaallisut (mouse) are favourites. In other cases, Inuit are named after dead people or people in traditional tales, by naming them after anatomical traits those people are believed to have had. Examples include "Itigaituk" (has no feet), "Anana" or "Anaana" (mother), "Piujuq" (beautiful) and "Tulimak" (rib). Inuit may have any number of names, given by parents and other community members.

=== Disc numbers and Project Surname ===
In the 1920s, changes in lifestyle and serious epidemics such as tuberculosis made the government of Canada interested in tracking Inuit in Canada's Arctic. Traditionally Inuit names reflect what is important in Inuit culture: environment, landscape, seascape, family, animals, birds, spirits. However these traditional names were difficult for non-Inuit to parse. Also, the agglutinative nature of Inuit language meant that names seemed long and were difficult for southern bureaucrats and missionaries to pronounce.

Thus, in the 1940s, the Inuit were given disc numbers, recorded on a special leather ID tag, similar to a dog tag. They were required to keep the tag with them always. (Some tags are now so old and worn that the number is polished out.) The numbers were assigned with a letter prefix that indicated location (E = east), community, and then the order in which the census-taker saw the individual. In some ways this state renaming was abetted by the churches and missionaries, who viewed the traditional names and their calls to power as related to shamanism and paganism.

They encouraged people to take Christian names. So a young woman who was known to her relatives as "Lutaaq, Pilitaq, Palluq, or Inusiq" and had been baptized as "Annie" was under this system to become Annie E7-121. People adopted the number-names, their family members' numbers, etc., and learned all the region codes (like knowing a telephone area code).

Until Inuit began studying in the south, many did not know that numbers were not normal parts of Christian and English naming systems. Then in the 1970s, the government started Project Surname, headed by Abe Okpik, to replace number-names with patrilineal "family surnames".

=== Words for snow ===
A popular belief exists that the Inuit have an unusually large number of words for snow. This is not accurate, and results from a misunderstanding of the nature of polysynthetic languages. In fact, the Inuit have only a few base roots for snow: 'qanniq-' ('qanik-' in some dialects), which is used most often like the verb to snow, and 'aput', which means snow as a substance. Parts of speech work very differently in the Inuit language than in English, so these definitions are somewhat misleading.

The Inuit languages can form very long words by adding more and more descriptive affixes to words. Those affixes may modify the syntactic and semantic properties of the base word, or may add qualifiers to it in much the same way that English uses adjectives or prepositional phrases to qualify nouns (e.g. "falling snow", "blowing snow", "snow on the ground", "snow drift", etc.)

The "fact" that there are many Inuit words for snow has been put forward so often that it has become a journalistic cliché.

=== Numbers ===
The Inuit use a vigesimal or base-20 counting system.

== Writing ==
Because the Inuit languages are spread over such a large area, divided between four different nations and political units and originally reached by Europeans of different origins at different times, there is no uniform way of writing the Inuit language.

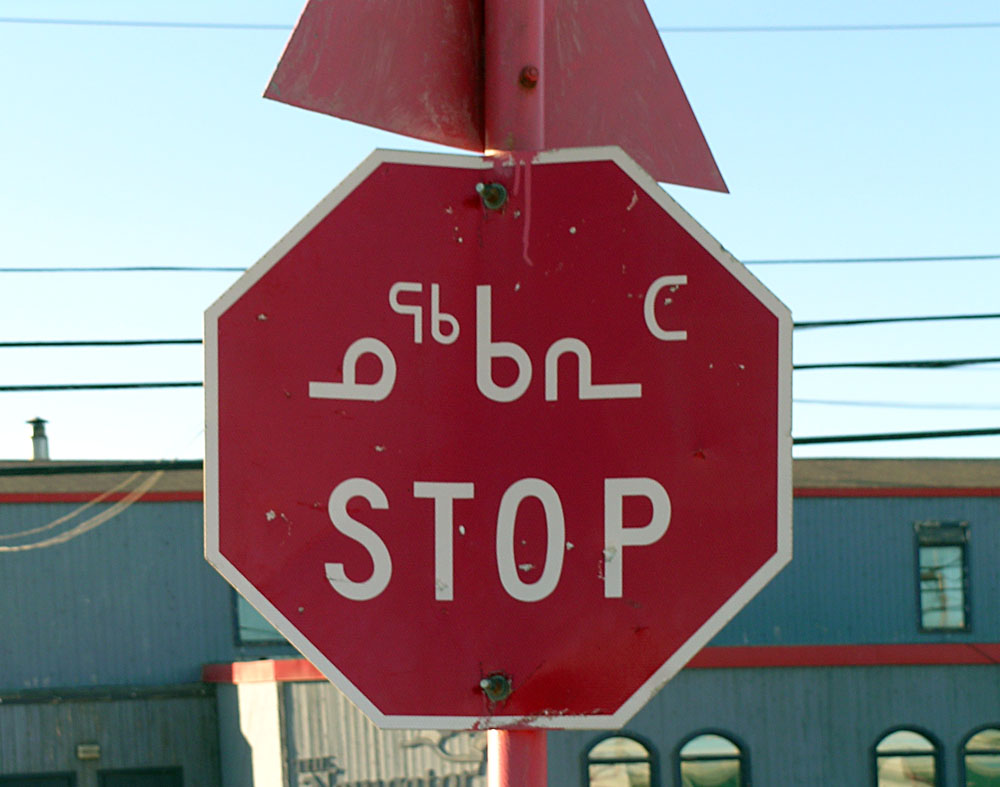
A stop sign in Inuktitut syllabics and English

Currently there are six "standard" ways to write the languages:

1. ICI Standard Syllabics (Canada)
2. ICI Standard Latin script (Canada)
3. Nunatsiavut Latin script (Canada)
4. Inuktut Qaliujaaqpait (Canada)
5. Alaskan Iñupiaq script (US)
6. Greenlandic

Though all except the syllabics use a Latin-based script, the alphabets differ in use of diacritics, non-Latin letters, etc. Most Inuktitut in Nunavut and Nunavik is written using a script called Inuktitut syllabics, based on Canadian Aboriginal syllabics. The western part of Nunavut and the Northwest Territories use a Latin script alphabet usually identified as Inuinnaqtun. In Alaska, another Latin alphabet is used, with some characters using diacritics. Nunatsiavut uses an alphabet devised with German-speaking Moravian missionaries, which includes the letter kra. Greenland's Latin alphabet was originally much like the one used in Nunatsiavut, but underwent a spelling reform in 1973 to bring the orthography in line with changes in pronunciation and better reflect the phonemic inventory of the language.

=== Canadian syllabics ===
The syllabics used to write Inuktitut (titirausiq nutaaq). The characters with the dots represent long vowels: in the Latin transcription, the vowel would be doubled.

Inuktitut syllabics, used in Canada, is based on Cree syllabics, devised by the missionary James Evans based on Devanagari, a Brahmi script. The present form of Canadian Inuktitut syllabics was adopted by the Inuit Cultural Institute in Canada in the 1970s.

Though presented in syllabic form, syllabics is not a true syllabary but an abugida, since syllables starting with the same consonant are written with graphically similar letters.

All of the characters needed for Inuktitut syllabics are available in the Unicode character repertoire, in the blocks Unified Canadian Aboriginal Syllabics.

=== Inuktut Qaliujaaqpait ===
The Canadian national organization Inuit Tapiriit Kanatami adopted Inuktut Qaliujaaqpait, a unified orthography for all varieties of Inuktitut, in September 2019. It is based on the Latin alphabet without diacritics.

== See also ==
- Duncan Pryde
