= Uummarmiutun =

Iñupiaq variety of Canada

- Uummaġmiutun
- Pronunciation: [uːm.mɑʁ.mi.u.tun]
- Native to: Canada
- Region: Northwest Territories
- Ethnicity: Uummarmiut
- Language family: Eskaleut: Inuit; Iñupiaq or Inuvialuktun; Uummarmiutun
- Early forms: Proto-Eskaleut: Proto-Eskimoan; Proto-Inuit

Language codes
- ISO 639-3: –
- Glottolog: None
- Inuit dialects. Uummarmiut is the orange within Canada.

Uummarmiutun (Inupiaq: [uːm.mɑʁ.mi.u.tun]), Uummaġmiutun or Canadian Iñupiaq is the variant of Iñupiaq (or Inuvialuktun) spoken by the Uummarmiut, part of the Inuvialuit, who live mainly in the communities of Inuvik and Aklavik in the Northwest Territories of Canada.

This dialect is essentially the same as that spoken by the Inupiat of Alaska, and is present in Canada because of migration from Alaska in the 1910s, reoccupying traditionally Siglit Inuit lands abandoned during the devastating disease outbreaks of the previous century.

Because Inuvik and Aklavik are ethnically mixed communities where English is the near-exclusive language of communication, few young people speak Uummarmiutun and the language is very endangered.

It is one of the three dialects – Kangiryuarmiutun and Siglitun are the other two – of the Inuit language grouped together under the label Inuvialuktun.

== Phonology ==
Uummartmiutun has thirty-one phonemes, six of which are vowels, three short and three long, five of which are diphthongs, the rest being consonants:

- Vowels: /a, i, u, aː, iː, uː, ai, ui, iu, ua, ia/
- Consonants: /p, t, k, g, q, m, n, ɲ, ŋ, f, v, ʁ, h, t͡ʃ, d͡ʒ, j, r, l, ɫ, j/

== Vocabulary comparison ==
A comparison of some animal names in the two dialects of Iñupiatun.

The similarity in names is sometimes obscured by the different spelling conventions used in Alaska and Canada.

Alaskan Iñupiaq	Canadian Iñupiaq	meaning
Uummaġmiutun	Uummarmiutun	Uummarmiut dialect
siksrik	hikr̂ik/sikr̂ik	ground squirrel
qugruk	qugr̂uk	tundra swan
aaġlu	arlu	killer whale
amaġuq	amaruq	gray wolf
isuŋŋaġluk	ihun’ngaq	Pomarine jaeger
kaŋuq	kanguq	snow goose
qunŋiq	qun’ngiq	reindeer (Note: The name reindeer for semi-domesticated subspecies (Rangifer tarandus tarandus). The wild subspecies (Porcupine tuttu).)
tiġiganniaq	tiriganiaq	Arctic fox
umiŋmak	umingmak	muskox

== See also ==
- Eskimo–Aleut Languages
- IPA
