= Siglit =

The Sallirmiut (formerly Siglit) are an Inuit group residing in the Inuvialuit Settlement Region.

The Sallirmiut are regarded as part of the Inuvialuit, or western Canadian Inuit. Inuvialuit is a modern political identity that brings together Sallirmiut with two other distinct Inuit groups, Ummarmiut and Kangiryurmiut. During the land claims process for the Inuvialuit Final Agreement, the Committee For Original People's Entitlement understood the importance of collective bargaining power and encouraged those from these three Inuit groups to recognize their similarities and fight for a land claim together.

The Sallirmiut speak Siglitun or Sallirmiutun, a severely endangered dialect of Inuvialuktun. In this dialect, the name Sallirmiut means "the people located farthest along the coastline", referring to their historical occupation of regions around the Mackenzie Delta. The Sallirmiut are the original Inuit group who lived in this region prior to European contact.

When Europeans arrived, the Sallirmiut were likely living in five socioterritorial groups, each specialized in an area or resource:

- Qikitaryungmiut, living near and named for Qikiqtariak [Big Island] or Herschel Island
- Kuukpangmiut, named for Kuukpak [Big River] or the Mackenzie River
- Kitigaryumiut, named for the large settlement or Kitigaryuit, whose translation has been lost
- Nuvugarmiut, name for Nuvurak, a village at Atkinson Point, on the Tuktoyaktuk Peninsula
- Avvarmiut, named for the village of Avak

Europeans called the Sallirmiut the Siglit or Tchiglit, which was likely a misinterpretation of salliq, a term that means “Coastal People”.
