= Uummarmiut =

The Uummarmiut or Uummaġmiut (Inupiaq: [uːm.mɑʁ.mi.ut], people of the green trees) are those Inuvialuit who live predominantly in the Mackenzie Delta communities of Aklavik and Inuvik, Northwest Territories, Canada. Their language is known as Uummarmiutun, an Inupiaq dialect of the Alaskan branch of the Eskimo–Aleut languages.

Originally from the Alaskan interior, where they were known as Nunamiut, they moved into the Siglit area around 1910, due to an increased demand for furs by the Hudson's Bay Company, the possibility of employment with the whaling industry and the lack of caribou in their traditional hunting grounds. The move was made easier because the Siglit had been decimated by diseases and were reduced to about 150 people.

At first the two groups were antagonistic towards each other, in part due to the Uummarmiut using poison when trapping. Over time, they have intermingled and inter-marriage has become common.
