= Inuinnaqtun =

Inuit language

- ᐃᓄᐃᓐᓇᖅᑐᓐ
- Pronunciation: [inuinːɑqtun]
- Native to: Canada (Nunavut and Northwest Territories)
- Native speakers: 1,310 (2016 census)
- Language family: Eskaleut: Eskimo; Inuit; Inuvialuktun; Inuinnaqtun
- Early forms: Proto-Eskimo–Aleut: Proto-Eskimo; Proto-Inuit
- Writing system: Latin, Inuktitut syllabics (Gjoa Haven only)

Official status
- Official language in: Nunavut; Northwest Territories
- Regulated by: Inuit Tapiriit Kanatami

Language codes
- ISO 639-1: iu
- ISO 639-2: iku Inuktitut
- ISO 639-3: ikt Inuinnaqtun, Western Canadian Inuktitut
- Glottolog: copp1244
- Inuit dialects. Inuinnaqtun is olive green.

- Inuinnaqtun is classified as Definitely Endangered by the UNESCO Atlas of the World's Languages in Danger

Inu- ᐃᓄ- / nuna ᓄᓇ "person" / "land"
- Person: Inuinnaq
- People: Inuinnait (Copper Inuit)
- Language: Inuinnaqtun; Tikuraq ᑎᑯᕋᖅ
- Country: Inuinnait Nunangat, Inuit Nunangat, ᐃᓄᐃᑦ ᓄᓇᖓᑦ

Inuinnaqtun (ᐃᓄᐃᓐᓇᖅᑐᓐ, Inuinnaqtun pronunciation: [inuinːɑqtun]; natively meaning 'like the real human beings/peoples') is an Inuit language. It is spoken in the central Canadian Arctic. It is related very closely to Inuktitut, and some scholars, such as Richard Condon, believe that Inuinnaqtun is more appropriately classified as a dialect of Inuktitut. The government of Nunavut recognises Inuinnaqtun as an official language in addition to Inuktitut, and together sometimes referred to as Inuktut. It is spoken in the Northwest Territories as well and is recognised as an official language of the territory in addition to Inuvialuktun and Inuktitut.

Inuinnaqtun is used primarily in the communities of Cambridge Bay, Kugluktuk and Gjoa Haven in the Kitikmeot Region of Nunavut. Outside Nunavut, it is spoken in the hamlet of Ulukhaktok, Northwest Territories, where it is also known as Kangiryuarmiutun, forming a part of Inuvialuktun. It is written using the Roman orthography except in Gjoa Haven, where Inuktitut syllabics are used for Utkuhiksalik, a sub-dialect of Natsilingmiutut.

== Phrases ==
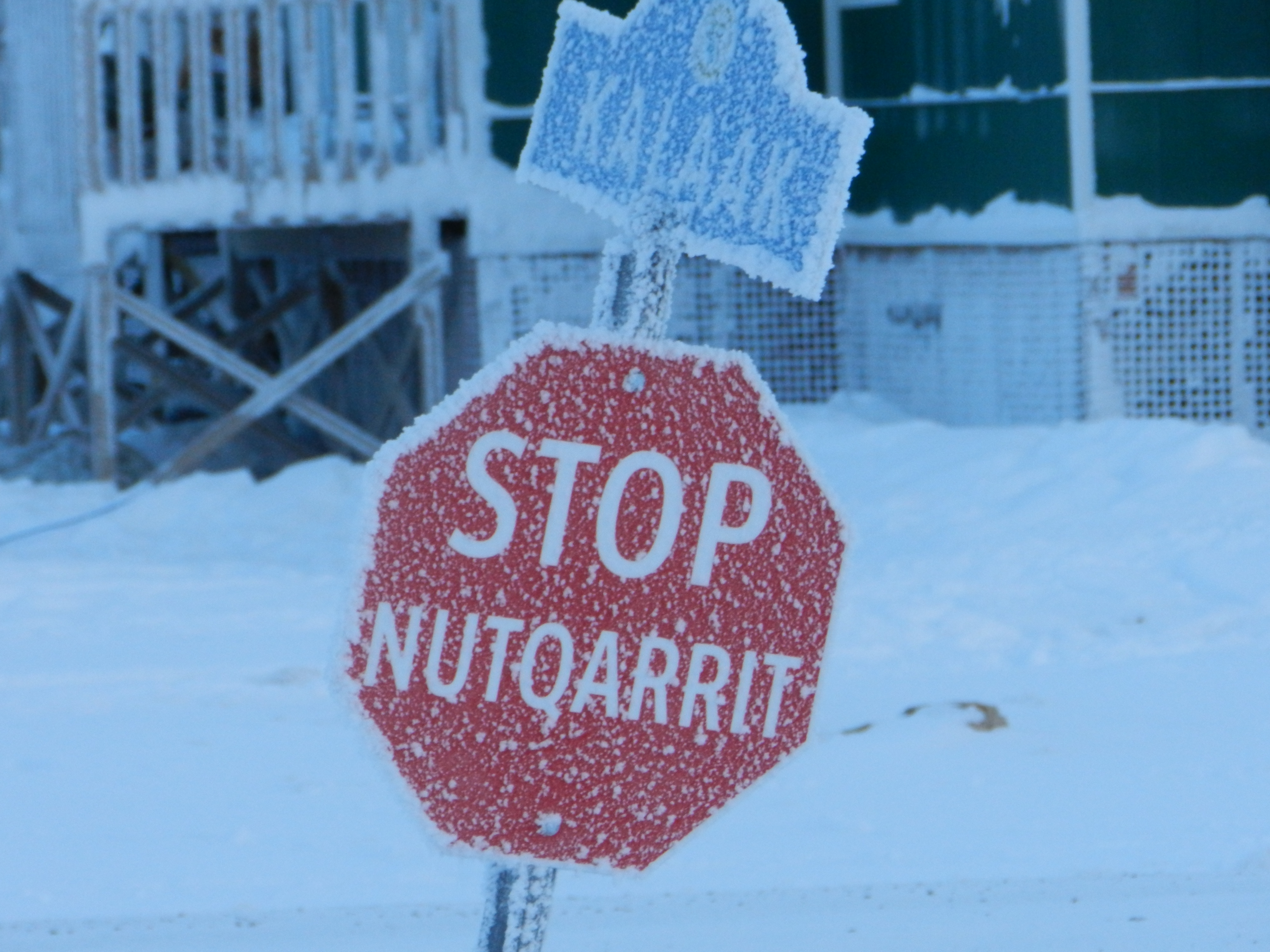
Stop sign in Cambridge Bay, Nutqarrit in Inuinnaqtun

English	Inuinnaqtun	pronunciation
Goodbye	Ilaanilu	/ilaːnilu/
Good morning	Ublaami	/ublaːmi/
How are you?	Qanuritpin	/qanuɢitpin/
I am fine	Naammaktunga	/naːmːaktuŋa/
I am good	Nakuyunga	/nakujuŋa/
How about you?	Ilvittauq	/ilvitːauq/
What are you doing?	Huliyutin?	/hulijutin/
What are you going to do?	Huliniaqpin?	/huliniaqpin/
I'm not going to do anything	Huliniahuanngittunga	/huliniahuaŋːitːuŋa/
I love you	Piqpagiyagin	/piqpaɡijaɡin/
I don't know	Nauna	/nauna/
Yes/Yeah	Ii	/iː/
No	Imannaq	/imanːaq/
Who are you?	Kinauvin?	/kinauvin/
Where are you from?	Namirmiutauyutin?	/namiɢmiutaujutin/
Where am I?	Namiitunga?	/namiːtuŋa/
Who is that person?	Kina taamna?	/kina taːmna/
Where is the store?	Nauk niuvirvik?	/nauk niuviɢvik/
How much is this?	Una qaffitaalauyuk?	/una qafːitaːlaujuk/
Do you have a phone?	Talafuutiqaqtutin?	/talafuːtiqaqtutin/
Do you have a camera?	Piksaliutiqaqtutin?	/piksaliutiqaqtutin/
Can you cut this?	Una pilakaalaaqtan?	/una pilakaːlaːqtan/
Would you like to go for a walk?	Pihuuyarumayutin?	/pihuːjaɢumajutin/
This is nice	Una pinniqtuq	/una pinːiqtuq/
I am going to work	Havagiarniaqpunga	/havaɡiaɢniaqpuŋa/
I am going home now	Angilrauniaqpunga	/aŋilɢauniaqpuŋa/
I am hungry	Kaagliqpunga	/kaːɡliqpuŋa/
I need help (help me)	Ikayullannga	/ikajulːaŋːa/
I like those	Aliagiyatka taapkua	/aliagijakta /taːpkua/
I will see you tomorrow	Aqaguttauq	/aqaɡutːauq/
My name is...	Atira...	/atiɢa/
I have a daughter	Paniqaqpunga	/paniqaqpuŋa/
I have a son	Irniqaqpunga	/iɢniqaqpuŋa/
Thanks	Quana	/quana/
Thank you	Quanaqqutin	/quanaqːutin/
Thank you very much	Quanaqpiaqqutin	/quanaqpiaqːutin/
You are welcome	Ilaali	/Ilaːli/
May I ask you a question?	Apirillaglagin?	/apiɢilːaɡlaɡin/
One	Atauhiq	/atauhiq/
Two	Malruuk	/malɢuːk/
Three	Pingahut	/piŋahut/
Four	Hitaman	/hitaman/
Five	Talliman	/talːiman/
Knife	Havik	/havik/
Fork	Kapuraut	/kapuɢaut/
Spoon	Aluut	/aluːt/
Plate	Akkiutaq	/akːiutaq/
Cup	Qallut	/qalːut/
That's all!	Taima!	/taima/
