= Kangiryuarmiutun =

Inuit language dialect

- Native to: Canada
- Language family: Eskaleut: Eskimo; Inuit; Inuvialuktun; Kangiryuarmiutun
- Early forms: Proto-Eskimo–Aleut: Proto-Eskimo; Proto-Inuit

Language codes
- ISO 639-3: –
- Linguist List: ikt-hol
- Glottolog: None

Kangiryuarmiutun (sometimes Kangirjuarmiut(un)) is an Inuit language variety spoken in Ulukhaktok, Northwest Territories, Canada by the Kangiryuarmiut, a Copper Inuit group. The dialect is part of the Inuvialuktun language. The people of Ulukhaktok prefer to think of it as Inuinnaqtun and it is essentially the same.

The name is derived from the word for Prince Albert Sound, Kangiryuak (meaning "the big bay"), and from the people that live there, the Kangiryuarmiut. Victoria Island is the ancestral home of the Copper Inuit.

== Vocabulary comparison ==
The comparison of some animal names in the Siglitun and Kangiryuarmiutun dialects of Inuvialuktun and Inuinnaqtun:

Siglitun	Kangiryuarmiutun	Inuinnaqtun	meaning
qugyuk	kogyok	qugjuk	tundra swan
qilalugaq	kilalogak	qilalugaq	beluga whale
tatidjgaq	tatilgak	tatilgaq	sandhill crane
aqidjgiq	nikhaktok	aqilgivik	willow ptarmigan
isun’ngaq	enhongalhuk	ihunngaq	jaeger

== See also ==
- Uummarmiutun
