= Kitigaaryuit =

Historic settlement in the Northwest Territories

Coordinates: 69°20′25″N 133°41′50″W

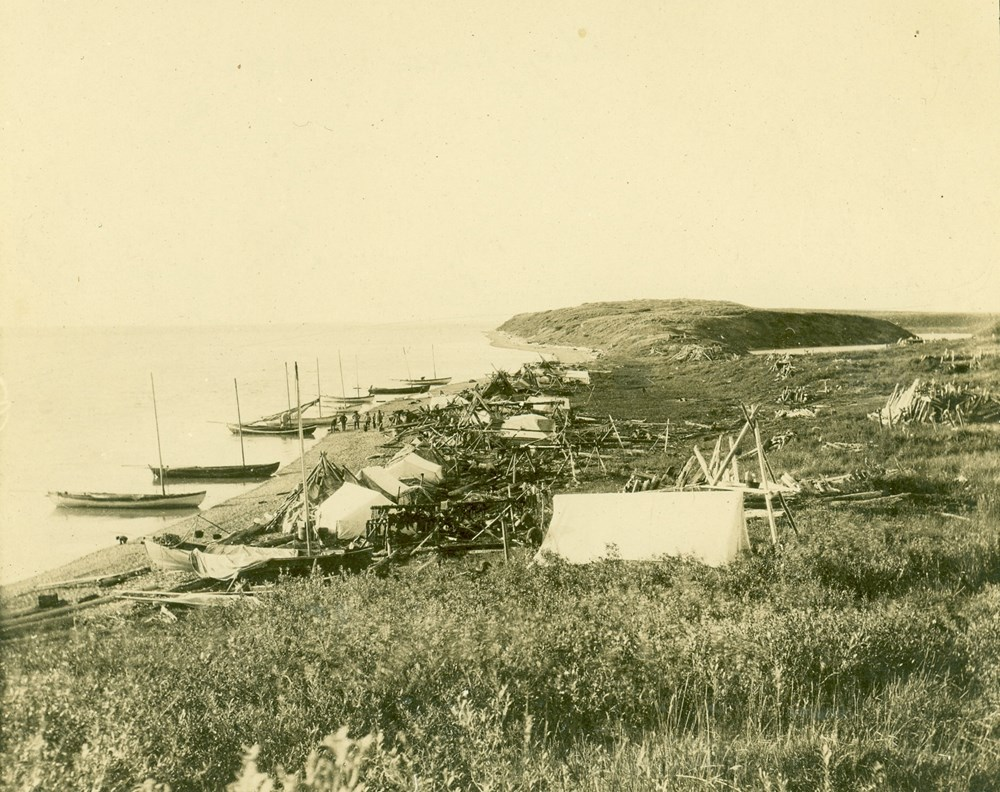
Photograph of Kitigaaryuit by Isaac Stringer, circa 1901

Kitigaaryuit (also spelled Kittigazuit) is a historic Inuvialuit settlement in Canada's Northwest Territories. It was the traditional territory of the Kitigaaryungmiut band of Inuvialuit. The site, which is situated near the junction of the Mackenzie River's East Channel and Kugmallit Bay, encompasses the villages of Kitigaaryuk and Tchenerark, which are located on a small island, and the adjacent village of Kuugaatchiaq, located on the mainland to the west of the island.

== History ==
Kitigaaryuit bears evidence of human settlement dating back to at least 1400 AD. During the summer, it was an important site for beluga whale hunting, and the largest known gatherings of Inuvialuit (up to 1000 people) are said to have occurred there. The very shallow waters in the area made it a sort of trap for belugas, which were hunted by groups of men in kayaks using harpoons. Kitigaaryuit's population varied by season; many Kitigaaryungmiut left the area around the start of autumn because better hunting prospects could be found elsewhere. In December, people would return for seasonal celebrations, but soon depart, only to return for the next beluga hunt. Inhabitants lived in caribou skin tents in the summer season and in multi-family wooden houses during the winter. Large buildings called qadjgit or kajigi were used as gathering places for men and for ceremonial purposes.

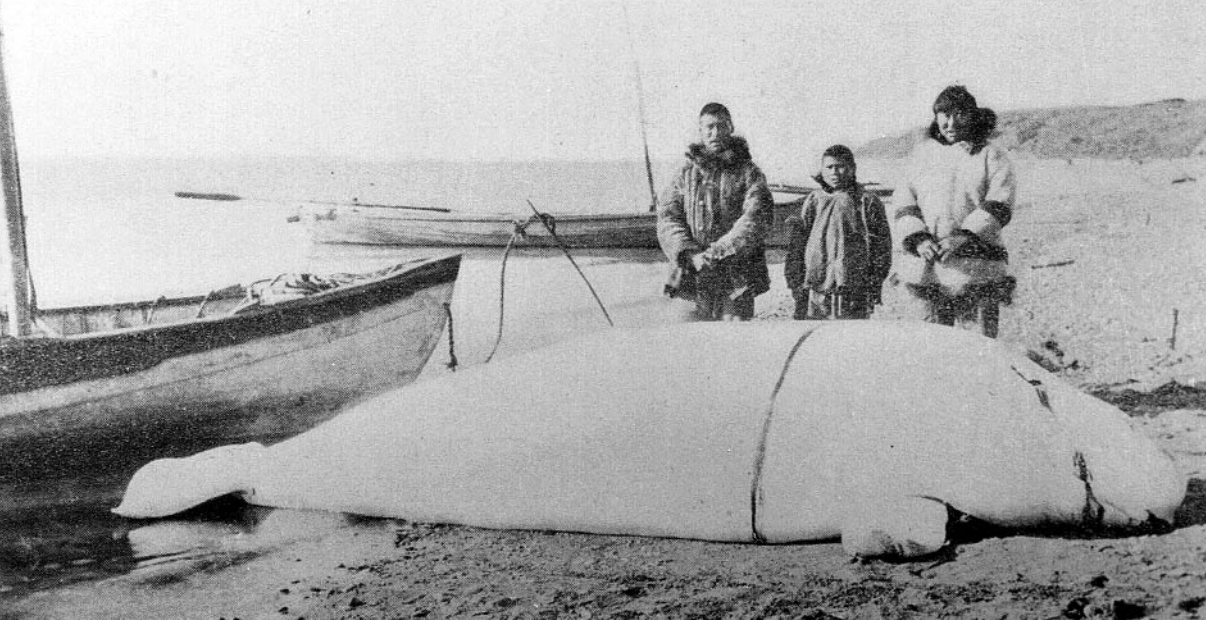
Hunters posing with a beluga whale carcass at Kitigaaryuk, circa 1910

While the Inuvialuit of the Mackenzie Delta had some prior contact with foreign traders, exposure to Western society increased after 1889, when large groups of American whalers began travelling to the area. Beginning in 1892, Christian missionaries, including Isaac Stringer, made visits to Kitigaaryuit; Stringer compiled detailed observations of Kitigaaryungmiut culture and drew maps of the area. In 1893, Stringer recorded the population of Kitigaaryuit as 197, a stark decrease from previous estimates. Epidemic disease resulting from increased contact with outsiders was likely responsible for much of this population decline.

A major epidemic of measles occurred in 1902, leading the remaining inhabitants to flee from Kitigaryuk. It would remain deserted for several years. An Inuvialuk elder recounted in an oral history interview:

It hadn't been long after the flu arrived that the people began to die off. People died in their tents. People died while they were working on the whales. [...] I remember there were so many people dying that they quit bothering to make graves. At times they would just put two or three bodies together and pile logs over them. It was a dreadful sight and a dreadful thing to think about at Kitigaaryuit, a place that had been so full of life and noise was now completely silent, for death was everywhere... People no longer went to Kitigaaryuit for there was fear of death all over the place.

— Felix Nuyaviak, quoted in Hart & Amos (2004)

People slowly returned, but by 1909, the population of Kitigaaryuit had declined to 103, many of whom were Alaskan Inupiat rather than Inuvialuit. The Hudson's Bay Company opened a trading post at Kitigaaryuk in 1912; it closed in 1933, and the area was abandoned thereafter, but is still occupied seasonally by hunters.

== Archaeology ==
The ruins of Inuvialuit winter dwellings can be found at Kitigaaryuk, along with hundreds of traditional grave sites. A 1969 expedition noted remains of the Hudson's Bay trading post and an associated log cabin and ice house. Excavations have revealed a great number of beluga whale bones. The Kittigazuit Archaeological Sites National Historic Site of Canada was established on the island in 1978.
