= Inuit phonology =

Sounds and pronunciation of Inuit languages

This article discusses the phonology of the Inuit languages. Unless otherwise noted, statements refer to Inuktitut dialects of Canada.

Most Inuit varieties have fifteen consonants and three vowel qualities (with phonemic length distinctions for each). Although Inupiatun and Qawiaraq have retroflex consonants, retroflexes have otherwise disappeared in all the Canadian and Greenlandic dialects.

== Vowels ==
Ranges of West Greenlandic monophthongs on a vowel chart. Adapted from Fortescue (1990:317).

Almost all dialects of Inuktitut have three vowel qualities and make a phonemic distinction between short and long vowels. In Inuujingajut (the standard alphabet of Nunavut), long vowels /Vː/ are written as a double vowel ⟨aa, ii, uu⟩.

| | Front | Back |
|---|---|---|
| Close | i iː | u uː |
| Open | a aː | |

In western Alaska, Qawiaraq and to some degree the Malimiutun variant of Inupiatun retains an additional vowel /ə/ which was present in proto-Inuit and is still present in Yupik, but which has become /i/ or sometimes /a/ in all other dialects. Thus, the common Inuktitut word for water – imiq – is emeq (/əməq/) in Qawiaraq.

Furthermore, many diphthongs in the Alaskan dialects have merged, suggesting the beginnings of a new more complex vowel scheme with more than three distinct vowels. This phenomenon is particularly noticeable in the Kobuk area, where the diphthongs /ua/ and /au/ are now both pronounced [ɔ]. Other diphthongs are also affected.

In contrast to the larger number of vowel contrasts in Alaskan dialects, in the dialect of northwest Greenland (particularly Upernavik), the phoneme /u/ has been replaced by /i/ in many contexts.

Otherwise, the three-vowel scheme described above holds for all of the Inuktitut dialects.

West Greenlandic vowels have a very wide range of allophones:

- /a/ varies between [e̞ ~ ɛ ~ æ ~ a̠ ~ ä ~ ɑ̟]. The last allophone appears before and especially between uvulars.
- /i/ varies between [i ~ ɪ̟ ~ e̠ ~ e̽ ~ ə]. The last allophone appears before and especially between uvulars.
- /u/ varies between [u̟ ~ u ~ ʊ̠ ~ o ~ o̞]. The last allophone appears before and especially between uvulars.

== Consonants ==
The Nunavut dialects of Inuktitut have fifteen distinct consonants, though some have more.

| | | Labial | Alveolar | | Retroflex | Palatal | Velar | Uvular | Glottal |
| | | Labial | med. | lat. | Retroflex | Palatal | Velar | Uvular | Glottal |
|---|---|---|---|---|---|---|---|---|---|
| Nasal | | m | n | | | | ŋ | | |
| Plosive | voiceless | p | t | | | | k | q | |
| Plosive | voiced | | | | | (ɟ) (Note: [ɟ] is an alternatively realized form of /ʐ/ in Canada.) | | | |
| Continuant | voiceless | | s | ɬ | ʂ (Note: /ʂ/ and /ʐ/ appear only in Inupiatun and Natsilingmiutut. Elsewhere, these have merged with /s/ (or /h/) and /j/, respectively.) | | | | (h) (Note: Only occurs in Inuinnaqtun, Kivallirmiutut, and Natsilingmiutut, due to the debuccalization from /s/, or in the case of Inuinnaqtun, also from /ɬ/.) |
| Continuant | voiced | v | | l | ʐ | j | ɣ | ʁ (Note: /ʁ/ assimilates to preceding nasal consonants by being realized as a uvular nasal [ɴ]. It is written ⟨r⟩ in Inuujingajut orthography.) | |

== Stress ==
Primary stress is said to fall on the last syllable of each word.

== Intonation ==
In Inuktitut, intonation is important in distinguishing some words – particularly interrogatives – but it is not generally marked in writing. There are some minimal pairs in Inuktitut where only pitch distinguishes between two different words, but they are rare enough that context usually disambiguates them in writing. One common case, however, is suva. A high pitch on the first syllable followed by a falling pitch on the second syllable means "What did you say?" A middle pitch on the first syllable followed by a rising pitch on the second means "What did he do?"

In general, Inuktitut uses intonation to mark questions in much the way English does. When an interrogative pronoun is used, pitch falls at the end of a question. When there is no interrogative pronoun, pitch rises on the last syllable.

Inuktitut speakers tend to lengthen vowels with a rising intonation. So, a rising tone is sometimes indicated indirectly by writing a double vowel:

| She can speak Inuktitut. | Inuktitut uqaqtuq. |
| Does she speak Inuktitut? | Inuktitut uqaqtuuq? |

== Phonotactics and sandhi ==
An Inuktitut syllable contains no more than one segment in the onset or coda. Thus, consonant clusters like /st/ or /pl/ that would arise from morphemes being joined together show assimilation or deletion. Word-finally, only voiceless stops (/p t k q/) occur unless consonant sandhi has occurred. Although two-consonant sequences occur when morphemes are joined together word-medially, three-segment clusters are consistently simplified.

Word-medially, two-segment sequences may occur, but these show restrictions in their distribution, based on voicing and nasality. The consonants that occur in these sequences belong to three groups:

| Voiceless: | p t k q s ɬ |
| Voiced: | v l j ɡ ʁ |
| Nasal: | m n ŋ |

Consonants in word-medial sequences always belong to the same group so that, e.g. /tp/, /vl/, and /mŋ/ occur, whereas */nt/, */qɡ/, and */lŋ/ are not found. Where the morphology of Inuktitut places consonants from different groups together, they are either replaced by a geminated consonant – in effect, total assimilation – or as a single consonant that takes its manner of articulation from one segment, and its place of articulation from the other. The process of eliminating three-segment clusters is similar with one of them disappearing. As a general rule, assimilation in Inuktitut is regressive – the first consonant takes its manner of articulation from the second consonant. But this varies amongst different dialects; the West Greenland dialect in particular tends to use progressive assimilation – the second consonant takes the manner of articulation from the first.

This limitation on consonant clusters is not quite universal across Inuit areas. One of the distinguishing features of western Alaskan dialects like Qawiaraq and Malimiutun is that nasal consonants can appear after consonants with other manners of articulation (this was a feature of Proto-Inuit as well as modern Yupik languages). Some examples include the Malimiut word qipmiq ('dog'; qimmiq in Inupiatun) and the Qawiaraq word iqniq ('fire'; inniq in other Inuktitut dialects).

Otherwise, different dialects have more phonotactic restrictions. In all forms of Inuktitut, /qk/ is impossible. In Inupiatun, Siglitun, and Inuinnaqtun (the far western dialects), all other consonant pairs are possible. Moving further east, the general rule is that more and more double consonants become geminated consonants. Determining which double consonants are assimilated depends on the place of articulation of the first consonant in the pair:

| Labial: | p v m |
| Alveolar: | t l n |
| Velar: | k ɡ ŋ |
| Uvular: | q ʁ |

In the Aivilik dialect, North and South Baffin, and all dialects spoken further south and east, all double consonants starting with an alveolar consonant are geminated:

'you (singular)'
| Dialect | word |
|---|---|
| Sew Inupiatunivlin | ivlin |
| Inupiatun | ilvich |
| Siglitun | ilvit |
| Inuinnaqtun | ilvit |
| Natsilingmiutut | ilvit |
| Kivallirmiutut | igvit |
| Aivilingmiutut | igvit |
| North Baffin | ivvit |
| South Baffin/Nunavik | ivvit |
| Labrador | iffit |
| Kalaallihut Inuktun | iglit |
| Kalaallisut | illit |
| East Kalaattisit | ittit |

In the North and South Baffin dialects, as well as the dialects to the south and east of Baffin Island, double consonants starting with a labial consonant are also geminated. E.g. North Baffin takagakku ('because I see her') vs. Aivilingmiutut takugapku

In South Baffin, Nunavik, Greenland and Labrador, double consonants starting with a velar consonant are also geminated:

| English | Inupiatun | Inuinnaqtun | Aivilingmiutut | North Baffin | South Baffin | Nunatsiavummiutut | Kalaallisut | East Kalaattisit |
|---|---|---|---|---|---|---|---|---|
| house | iglu | iglu | iglu | iglu | illu | illuK^{1} [illuq] | illu [iɬːu] | ittiq |

In addition, some dialects of Inuktitut pronounce [bl] ([vl] in Inupiatun) in place of the geminated lateral approximant /ll/. The phonological status of this distinction is uncertain – some dialects have both [bl] and [ll]. This feature is generally characteristic of western and central dialects as opposed to eastern ones.

| English | Inupiatun | Inuinnaqtun | Aivilingmiutut | North Baffin | South Baffin | Nunatsiavummiutut | Kalaallisut | East Kalaattisit |
|---|---|---|---|---|---|---|---|---|
| thumb | kuvlu | kublu | kublu | kullu | kullu | kulluK^{1} [kulluq] | kulloq^{1} [kuɬːʊq] | tikkit |

Note 1 qitilliK, kulluK, kulloq: In the Nunatsiavummiutut alphabet, a capital K indicates the same uvular stop as q in the Inupiatun, Inuinnaqtun, Kalaallisut and Nunavut alphabets. Furthermore, o in the Kalaallisut alphabet represents the same phoneme as u in the alphabets used for other varieties of Inuktitut. Contrasts between alphabets are described below.

Double consonants where the second consonant is /s/ undergo more complex changes across dialects. In some cases assimilation is progressive (from the first consonant to the second), in others regressive, and in still others double consonants are neutralised into a single form.

| Seward Inupiaq | North Inupiaq | Siglitun | Western dialects | Inuinnaqtun | Ahiarmiut | Natsilik/Kivalliq | North Baffin | South Baffin & Nunavik | Kalaallisut | Kalaallihut | Kalaattisit |
|---|---|---|---|---|---|---|---|---|---|---|---|
| ks/gz | ks/ksr | ks | ks | kh | kk | kh | ks | ts | ss | gh | ts |
| vs/pz | ps | ps | ps | ff | pp | ph | ss | ts | ss | hh | ts |
| qs/qz | qs/qsr | qs | qs | qh | qq | qh | qs | ts | rs | rh | rs/rt |
| ss/zz | tch | tch | ts | tt | tt | ts | tt | ts | ts | ts | ts |

== Other systematic dialectical variations ==
=== Consonant weakening in Qawiaraq ===
Many phonemes in the Qawiaraq dialect have undergone a process of consonant weakening, although to what degree varies somewhat between villages. This process is motivated in part by prosody and parallels the consonant weakening processes at work in Yupik. As a result, many stops have become fricatives and many fricatives have become glides or completely disappeared. For example, the word meat – niqi in most dialects – is rendered as nigi in Qawiaraq – the stop /q/ has become the fricative /ɣ/.

Consonant weakening is most noticeable in the area adjacent to the Bering Strait in the westernmost part of Alaska.

=== Palatalization in Inupiatun ===
The historical fourth vowel of Inuktitut – the schwa /ə/ – affected the pronunciation of alveolar consonants following it. Where an /i/ was present in proto-Inuktitut, the following consonant is palatalized in modern Inupiatun (except where it has been assibilated – see assibilation below). Thus, for example, /t/ becomes /tʃ/, spelled ch alone and tch when geminated, after some i but not others. For example, the second person singular pronoun ilvit – you – in more easterly dialects of Inuktitut becomes ilvich in Inupiatun. In contrast, iqit (fist, iqitii in Canadian Inuktitut), which was pronounced [əqət] in proto-Inuktitut, retains its stop /t/.

Similar processes affect other alveolar consonants:

| Alveolar consonant | Palatal consonant | Inupiatun spelling | Example |
|---|---|---|---|
| /t/ | /tʃ/ | ch (tch when geminated) | ilvit → ilvich (you [sg.]) |
| /n/ | /ɲ/ | ñ | inuk → iñuk (person) |
| /l/ | /ʎ/ | ḷ | silami → siḷami (outside) |

In the Malimiut variant of Inupiatun, this process is extended to some velar consonants, like /k/ and /ɡ/.

=== Assibilation ===
In a number of dialects, /t/ preceded by an /i/ derived from an */i/ in Proto-Inuktitut rather than an */ə/ may become an /s/ (or an /h/ in dialects that use "h" in place of "s") when followed by another vowel:

| English | Inupiatun | Siglitun | Natsilingmiutut | Kivallirmiutut | North Baffin | Kalaallisut |
|---|---|---|---|---|---|---|
| he/she comes in | isiqtuq | itiqtuaq | ihiqtuq | itiqtuq | isiqtuq | iserpoq |

This feature varies from dialect to dialect and does not follow a consistent east/west pattern, as assibilation is present in some words in both Alaskan Inupiatun and Greenlandic Kalaallisut. The exact conditions in which Proto-Inuktitut consonants have been assibilated vary from dialect to dialect, often determined by the following vowel and other factors.

=== Fricative substitution in western Nunavut ===
Many of the western and central dialects of Nunavut – including Inuinnaqtun, Kivallirmiutut and Natsilingmiutut – realize the phoneme /s/ as [h]. Inuinnaqtun also pronounces /ɬ/ as [h]. This leads to an additional constraint on double consonants in Inuinnaqtun: a stop followed by the fricative [h] becomes a fricative at the same point of articulation. This feature does not extend west of Inuinnaqtun and is not present in Siglitun or Inupiatun.

| English | Inuinnaqtun | Kivallirmiutut | North Baffin |
|---|---|---|---|
| egg | ikhi [ixhi] | ikhi [ikhi] | iksi |
| blubber | uqhuq [uχhuq] | uqhuq [uqhuq] | uqsuq |
| walking (3p. sg) | pihukhuni ([pihuxhuni]) | pihukhuni [pihukhuni] | pisukɬuni |

=== Retroflex consonants in western dialects ===
Natsilingmiutut retains as a phoneme the stop, and often retroflex, palatal consonant /ɟ/. This consonant has merged with /j/ in all other Nunavut and eastern dialects of Inuktitut. In Inupiatun, the /ɟ/ of Natsilingmiutut and the /j/ in some central Inuktitut words has become [ʐ] (written ⟨r⟩).

| English | Inupiatun | Natsilingmiutut | North Baffin | Itivimiutut | Kalaallisut |
|---|---|---|---|---|---|
| eye | iri [iʐi] | iri [iji] | iji | iri | isi |
| kayak | qayaq [qajaq] | qajaq [qajaq] | qajaq | qaraq | qajaq |
| big | angiruq [aŋiʐuq] | angiruq [aŋiɟuq] | angijuq [aŋijuq] | angiruq | angivoq |

In addition to the voiced retroflex fricative /ʐ/ (represented orthographically as ⟨r⟩), Inupiatun also has a voiceless retroflex fricative /ʂ/ represented as ⟨sr⟩. This additional manner of articulation is largely distinctive to Inupiatun – it is absent from the more easterly dialects, except for the /ɟ/ of Natsilingmiutut.

| English | Qawiaraq | Inupiatun | Siglitun | Natsilingmiutut | North Baffin | Kalaallisut |
|---|---|---|---|---|---|---|
| spider | aachivak | aasrivak | aasivak | aahivak | aasivaq | aasiak |
| penis | uchuk | usruk | usuk | uhuk | usuk | usuk |

The Qawiaraq dialect of Inupiatun, furthermore, has a third retroflex consonant in addition to the two present in other varieties of Inupiatun: the retroflex approximant /ɻ/.

=== Double consonant clusters in Nunavimmiutut ===
Nunavik Inuktitut, in contrast to other dialects, does not allow two double consonants to appear with only one syllable between them. Wherever this occurs, the first consonant in the second consonant pair is deleted.

| English | North Baffin | Nunavimmiutut |
|---|---|---|
| calendar | ulluqsiut | ullusiut |
| he is coughing | quiqtuqtuq | quiqtutuq |

=== Glottal stops ===
In a number of dialects, uvular consonants and ordinary stops are replaced with glottal stops in some contexts. Which uvular consonants and which contexts varies to some degree across dialects. Most frequently, a /q/ or in some cases a /ʁ/ before another consonant is transformed into a glottal stop. Thus, the Inuktitut name of the hamlet of Baker Lake is pronounced Qamaniqtuaq or Qamanittuaq by most Inuktitut speakers, but is rendered Qamani'tuaq in Baker Lake itself. This phenomenon occurs in a number of dialects, but is particularly noticeable in Nunavimmiutut and in central Nunavut dialects like Kivallirmiutut.

In Natsilingmiutut, the velar nasal consonant /ŋ/ sometimes becomes a glottal stop when followed by another consonant, but not in all cases.

== See also ==
- Greenlandic phonology
- Inuit grammar

== Bibliography ==
- Fortescue, Michael (1990), "Basic Structures and Processes in West Greenlandic" (PDF), in Collins, Dirmid R. F. (ed.), Arctic Languages: An Awakening, Paris: UNESCO, pp. 309–332, ISBN 92-3-102661-5
- Gordon, Matthew (2002), "A Factorial Typology of Quantity-insensitive stress", Natural Language & Linguistic Theory, 20 (3): 491–552, CiteSeerX 10.1.1.233.1182, doi:10.1023/A:1015810531699, S2CID 11135686
- Kaplan, Lawrence D. (1990), "The Language of the Alaskan Inuit" (PDF), in Collins, Dirmid R. F. (ed.), Arctic Languages: An Awakening, Paris: UNESCO, pp. 131–158, ISBN 92-3-102661-5
