= Muktuk =

Traditional Inuit and Chukchi food consisting of frozen whale skin and blubber

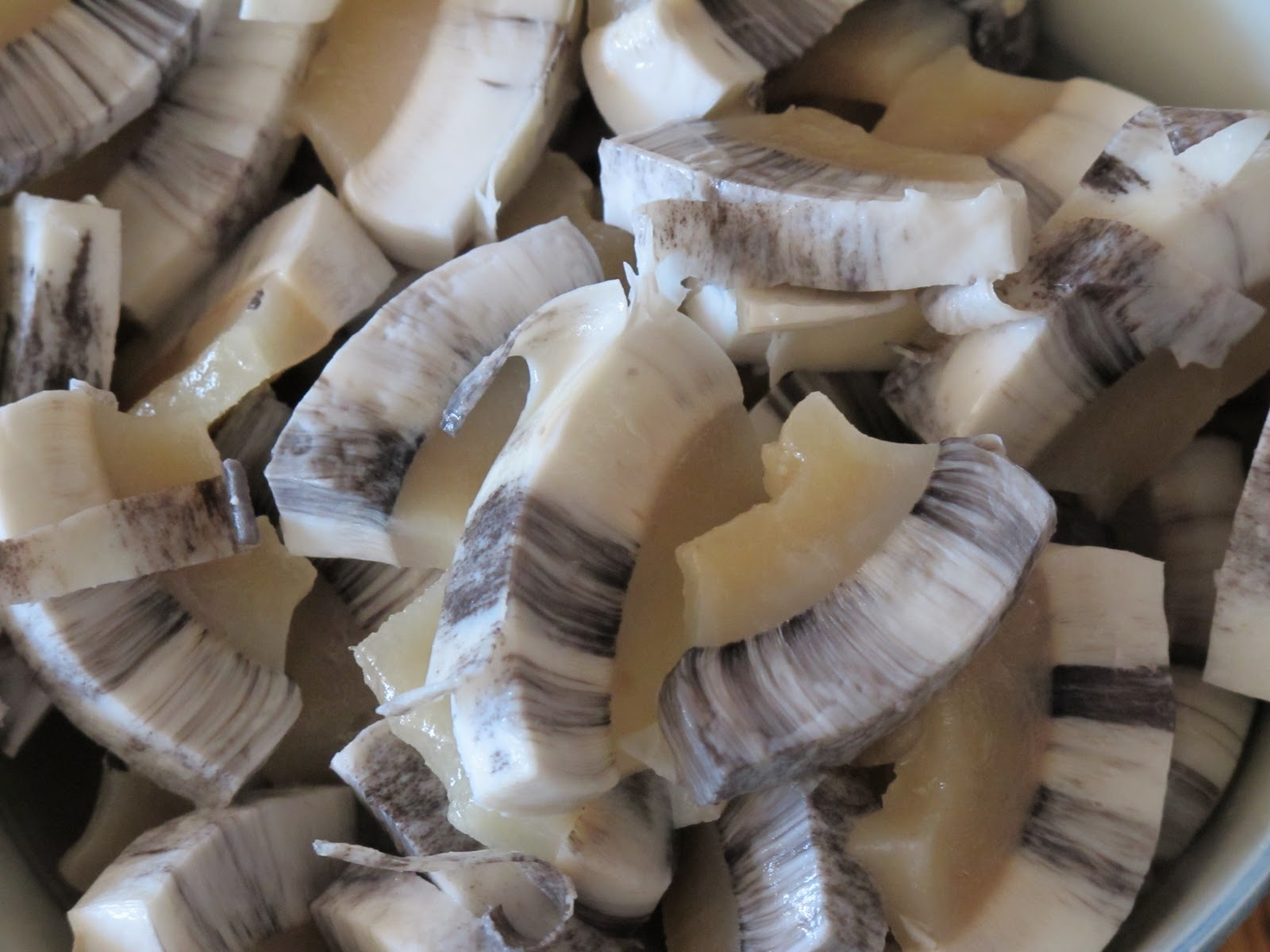
Sliced and prepared muktuk

Muktuk (anglicized from various names below) is a traditional food of Inuit and other circumpolar peoples, consisting of whale skin and blubber. A part of Inuit cuisine, it is most often made from the bowhead whale, although the beluga and the narwhal are also used. It is usually consumed raw, but can also be eaten frozen, cooked, or pickled.

== Names ==
The English muktuk (muck-tuck) is a transliteration of several Inuit language terms for the skin and blubber, including:

- maktaaq (ᒪᒃᑖᖅ) in Sallirmiutun (Siglitun), Kivalliq, Aivilingmiutut (Aivilik), North Baffin, East Baffin, South Baffin
- maktak (ᒪᒃᑕᒃ) in Iñupiaq, Sallirmiutun, North Baffin
- maktaq in Inuinnaqtun, Natsilingmiutut (Inuvialuktun)
- mattak in Labrador, Greenland
- mangtak in Alaskan Yupʼik
- mungtuk in Siberian Yupik
- mimaq in Alutiiq (Sugpiaq)

In some dialects, such as Inuinnaqtun, the word muktuk refers only to the edible parts of the whale's skin and not to the blubber.

It is known as икииԓгин ikiilgin in Chukchi.

== Methods of preparation ==
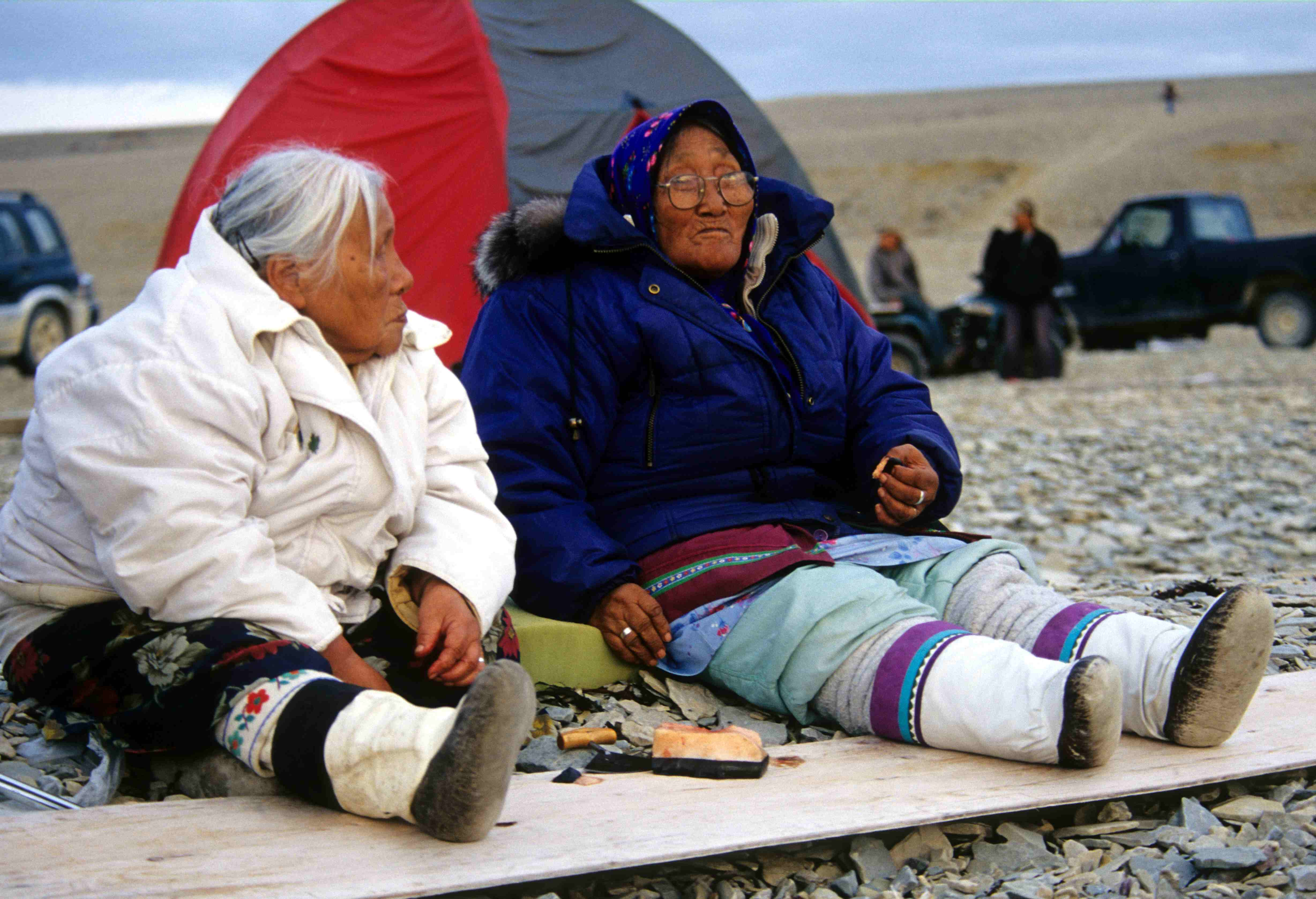
Canadian Inuit elders sharing muktuk, outside their summer tents, 2002

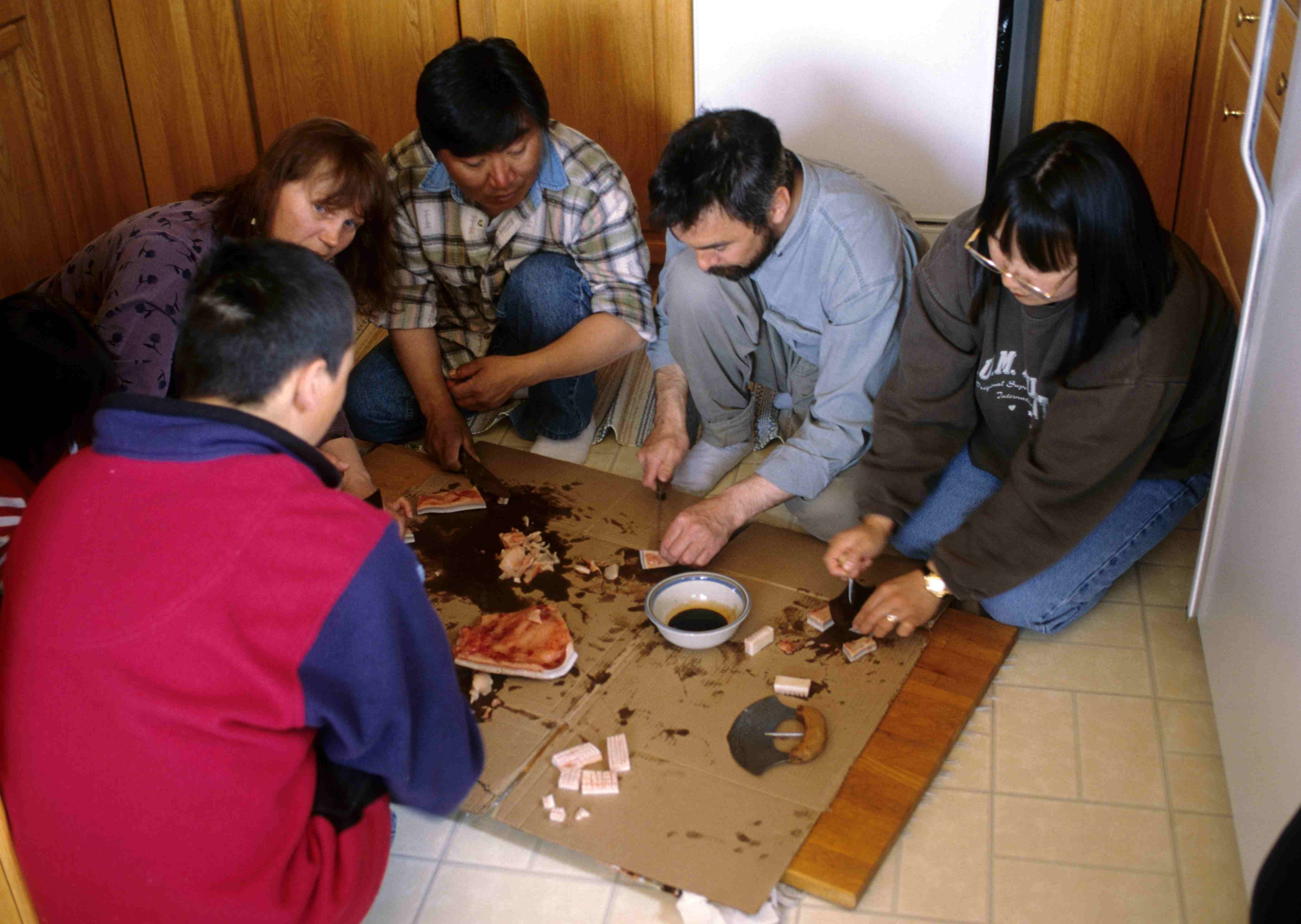
Expedition team of German photographer Ansgar Walk eating muktuk in celebration of a young hunter's catch in the Canadian Arctic, 1997

In Greenland, muktuk (mattak) is sold commercially to fish factories, and in Canada (muktaaq) to other communities.

One account of a 21st-century indigenous whale hunt describes the skin and blubber eaten as a snack while the rest of the whale meat is butchered (flensed) for later consumption. It can be eaten raw or cooked; when boiled, this snack is known as unaaliq.

In recent times, maktak are served with introduced condiments that locals have acquired the taste for such as HP Sauce, and soy sauce.

== Nutrients and health concerns ==
Muktuk is a good source of vitamin C (ascorbic acid), the epidermis containing up to 38 mg (0.59 gr) per 100 grams (3.5 oz). British Arctic explorers used it to prevent scurvy. Blubber is also a source of vitamin D.

Proceedings of the Nutrition Society stated in the 1950s that:

The most important item of food of the Polar Eskimos is the narwhal (Monodon monoceros). [...] The skin (mattak) is greatly relished and tastes like hazel-nuts; it is eaten raw and contains considerable amounts of glycogen and ascorbic acid. The White whale (Delphinupterus leucas) is almost as important...

Contaminants from the industrialised world have made their way to the Arctic marine food web. This poses a health risk to people who eat "country food" (traditional Inuit foodstuffs). As whales grow, mercury accumulates in the liver, kidney, muscle, and blubber, and cadmium settles in the blubber, the same process that makes mercury in fish a health issue for humans. Whale meat also bioaccumulates carcinogens such as PCBs, chemical compounds that damage human nervous, immune and reproductive systems, and a variety of other contaminants.

Consumption of muktuk has also been associated with outbreaks of botulism.

== See also ==
- Nalukataq, spring whaling festival
- Marine mammals as food
- Chukchi cuisine
