= Sirenik language =

Extinct Eskimo–Aleut language

Sirenik
- Sirenik Yupik, Sirenikski, Vuteen
- Сиӷы́ных, Uqeghllistun
- Pronunciation: [siˈʁənəx]
- Native to: Russia
- Region: Bering Strait region, mixed populations in settlements Sireniki and Imtuk
- Ethnicity: Sireniks
- Extinct: January 1997, with the death of Valentina Wye; 5 (2010)
- Language family: Eskaleut: Eskimo; Yupik?; Sirenik
- Early forms: Proto-Eskimo–Aleut: Proto-Eskimo; Proto-Yupik?
- Writing system: Transcribed with Cyrillic in old monographs New publications may appear with the Latin script

Language codes
- ISO 639-3: ysr
- Glottolog: sire1246
- ELP: Sirenikski
- Map of Yupik settlements in Russia and St. Lawrence Island. The settlement of Sireniki is indicated with the red and yellow dot.

- Sirenik is classified as Extinct by the UNESCO Atlas of the World's Languages in Danger.

Sirenik, Sirenik Yupik, Sireniki Yupik (also Old Sirenik or Vuteen), or Sirenikskiy, is an extinct Eskaleut language. It was spoken in and around the village of Sireniki (Сиреники) in Chukotka Peninsula, Chukotka Autonomous Okrug, Russia. The language shift has been a long process, ending in total language death. In January 1997, the last native speaker of the language, a woman named Vyjye (Valentina Wye; Russian: Выйе) died. Ever since that point, the language has been extinct; nowadays, all Sireniks speak Siberian Yupik or Russian. Despite this, censuses as late as 2010 report up to 5 native speakers of Sirenik.

Сиӷы́ных ([siˈʁənəx]) is the endonym for the eponymous settlement of Sireniki. The endonym for the people itself is сиӷы́ныгмы̄́ӷий ([siˈʁənəɣˈməːʁij]; 'Sirenikites'); the singular form is сиӷы́ныгмы̄́ӷа [siˈʁənəɣˈməːʁa].

This article is based on Menovschikov (1964), with cited examples transliterated from Cyrillic transcription to the International Phonetic Alphabet.

== Classification ==
=== Genealogical ===
==== External ====
Sirenik is an Eskimoan language, one of the two major groupings of the Eskaleut languages. The exact genealogical classification of Sirenik within its group is uncertain. Some argue that Sirenik is a remnant of a third group of Eskimoan languages, in addition to Yupik and Inuit groups (see a visual representation by tree and an argumentation based on comparative linguistics); others regard it as belonging to the Yupik branch, or as forming a Yupik–Sirenik branch with Yupik.

Many words are formed from entirely different roots to those in Siberian Yupik. In addition, the grammar has several peculiarities compared to the other Eskimoan languages as well as Aleut. For example, although most Eskaleut languages, including Sirenik's neighboring relative Siberian Yupik, have dual number, it is not known in Sirenik. The peculiarities amounted to mutual unintelligibility with even its nearest language relatives. This forced Sirenik people to use Chukchi as a lingua franca when speaking with neighboring Eskimo peoples. Thus, any external contacts for Sirenik people required using a different language: they either resorted to the use of a lingua franca, or used the Siberian Yupik language (definitely a mutually unintelligible, different language for them, not just a dialect of their own). This difference from all their language relatives may be the result of a supposed long isolation from other Eskimo groups: Sirenik people may have been in contact only with speakers of unrelated languages for many centuries in the past, and their language may have been influenced, especially by non-relative Chukchi.

==== Internal ====
Although the number of its speakers was very few even at the end of the nineteenth century, the language had at least two dialects in the past.

=== Typological ===
As for its morphological typology, it has polysynthetic and incorporative features, just like the other Eskimoan languages.

== Phonology ==
=== Consonants ===
		Labial	Alveolar	Palatal	Velar	Uvular	Glottal
Nasal	voiced	m	n		ŋ		
Nasal	voiceless		n̥				
Stop/Affricate		p	t	t͡ʃ	k	q	ʔ
Fricative	voiceless	(f)	s	(ʃ)	x	χ	
Fricative	voiced	v			ɣ	ʁ	
Approximant	voiceless		l̥	j̊			
Approximant	voiced		l	j		w	

- Some consonants can be palatalized, e.g.: /lʲ̥/.
- Sounds [f, ʃ] are heard as variants of /v, s/.

=== Vowels ===
	Front	Central	Back
Close	i iː	ɨ ɨː	u uː
Mid		ɨ ɨː	
Open		a aː	

- Sounds /ɨ, ɨː/ may also range to [ə, əː].

== Morphology ==
Like all other Eskimo languages, the morphology is rather complex. A description grouped by lexical categories follows.

=== Nominal and verbal ===
Although morphology will be treated grouped into a nominal and a verbal part, many Eskimo languages show features which "crosscut" any such groupings in several aspects:

- the ergative structure at verbs is similar to the possessive structure at nouns (see section §Ergative–absolutive);
- a physical similarity exists between nominal and verbal personal suffix paradigms, i.e., in most cases, the respective person-number is expressed with the same sequence of phonemes at:
  - possessive suffixes (at nouns)
  - verbal suffixes;
- nomenverbum-like roots, becoming nominal or verbal only via the suffix they get;
- Eskimo texts abound in various kinds of participles (see section §Participles);

==== Common grammatical categories ====
Some grammatical categories (e.g. person and number) are applicable to both verbal and nominal lexical categories.

Although person and number are expressed in a single suffix, sometimes it can be traced back to consist of a distinct person and a distinct number suffix. (Note: Person and number in a single suffix, or in two distinct ones.)

===== Person =====
Paradigms can make a distinction in 3rd person for "self", thus the mere personal suffix (of the verb or noun) can distinguish e.g.

a nominal example
"He/she takes his/her own dog" versus "He/she takes the dog of another person".
a verbal example
"He/she sees himself/herself" versus "He/she sees him/her (another person)"

Thus, it can be translated into English (and some other languages) using a reflexive pronoun. This notion concerns also other concepts in building larger parts of the sentence and the text, see section §Usage of third person suffixes.

===== Number =====
Although other Eskimo languages know more than the familiar two grammatical numbers, by having also dual, Sireniki uses only singular and plural. Sireniki is, as mentioned above, peculiar in this aspect, alongside Greenlandic, within the Eskimo–Aleut language family, with even its neighboring Siberian Yupik relatives having dual number.

==== Deictic demonstrative pronouns ====
Sireniki had an unusual wide range of deictic distinctions between up to four distances (near, medial, far and out_of_view) which could be horizontal "una">"igna">"ikna", vertical "mana">"unygna">"pikna", marking a movement like approaching the speaker "ukna", away from them "agna", refer to conversational topics be they definite "ugna">"k’amna">oov "amna" or indefinite "k’akymna">"k’agna">oov "akymna" or describe sth in the past "imna".

==== Building verbs from nouns ====
Suffix -/ɕuɣɨn/- meaning "to be similar to sth":

Root	Becomes verbal by suffix (Note: Suffix -/ɕuɣɨn/- meaning "to be similar to sth".)	Indicative mood, singular 3rd person
/mɨtɨχlʲ̥ux/	/mɨtɨχlʲ̥ux-ɕuɣɨn/-	/mɨtɨχlʲ̥ux-ɕuɣɨn-tɨ-χ/
raven	to be similar to a raven	he/she is similar to a raven

===== Predicative form of a noun =====
Predicative form of a noun can be built using suffix -/t͡ʃ ɨ/-: (Note: Predicative form of a noun (suffix -/t͡ʃ ɨ/-).)

Root	Predicative form	Examples	
Root	Predicative form	Singular 2nd person	Singular 3rd person
/juɣ/	/juɣɨ t͡ʃ ɨ/-	/juɣɨ t͡ʃ ɨtɨn/	/juɣɨ t͡ʃ ɨχ/
man	to be a man	you are a man	he/she is a man

===== Verbs built from toponyms =====
- /imtuk/ (a toponym: Imtuk)
- /imtux-tɨqɨχ-tɨ-ŋ/ (I travel to Imtuk.) (Note: Verbs built from toponyms.)

=== Nominal lexical categories ===
==== Grammatical categories ====
Not only the grammatical cases of nouns are marked by suffixes, but also the person of possessor (use of possessive pronouns in English) can be expressed by agglutination.

Excerpt from cases and personal possessive form of /taŋaχ/ (child) (Note: Personal possessive form.)
	Sing 1st person	Sing 2nd person
Absolutive	/taŋaqa/ (my child)	/taŋaʁɨn/ (your child)
Ablative / Instrumental	/taŋamnɨŋ/ (from my child)	/taŋaχpɨnɨŋ/ (from your child)
Dative / Lative	/taŋamnu/ (to my child)	/taŋaχpɨnu/ (to your child)
Locative	/taŋamni/ (at my child)	/taŋaχpɨni/ (at your child)
Equative (comparative)	/taŋamtɨn/ (like my child)	/taŋaχpɨtɨn/ (like your child)

It is just an excerpt for illustration: not all cases are shown, Sirenik language has more grammatical cases. The table illustrates also why Sirenik language is treated as agglutinative (rather than fusional).

There is no grammatical gender (or gender-like noun class system).

===== Case =====
Sireniki is an absolutive–ergative language.

Cases (listed using Menovščikov's numbering):

1. Absolutive
2. Relative case, playing the role of both genitive case and ergative case.
3. Ablative / Instrumental, used also in accusative structures.
4. Dative / Lative
5. Locative
6. Vialis case, see also Prosecutive case, and "motion via"
7. Equative (comparative)

To see why a single case can play such distinct roles at all, read morphosyntactic alignment, and also a short table about it.

Some finer grammatical functions are expressed using postpositions. Most of them are built as a combinations of cases

- lative or locative or ablative
- combined with relative (used as genitive)

in a similar way as we use expressions like "on top of" in English.

=== Verbal lexical categories ===
Also at verbs, the morphology is very rich. Suffixes can express grammatical moods of the verb (e.g. imperative, interrogative, optative), and also negation, tense, aspect, the person of subject and object. Some examples (far from being comprehensive):

Phonology	Meaning	Grammatical notes			
Phonology	Meaning	Person, number of		Mood	Others
Phonology	Meaning	subject	object	Mood	Others
/aʁaʁɨ-tɨqɨχ-tɨ-mkɨn/	I lead you	Singular 1st person	Singular 2nd person	Indicative	
/aʁaʁɨ-ɕuk-ɨ-mɕi/	Let me lead you	Singular 1st person	Singular 2nd person	Imperative (Note: Imperative.)	
/nɨŋɨ-sɨɣɨŋ-sɨn/	Don't you see me?	Singular 2nd person	Singular 1st person	Interrogative	Negative polarity (Note: Negation form of a verb.)

The rich set of morphemes makes it possible to build huge verbs whose meaning could be expressed (in most of widely known languages) as whole sentences (consisting of more words) . Sireniki – like the other Eskimo languages – has polysynthetic and incorporative features, in many forms, among others polypersonal agreement.

==== Grammatical categories ====
The polysynthetic and incorporative features mentioned above manifest themselves in most of the ways Sirenik language can express grammatical categories.

===== Transitivity =====
For background, see transitivity. (Remember also section #Ergative–absolutive.)

See also Nicole Tersis and Shirley Carter-Thomas (2005).

===== Polarity =====
Even the grammatical polarity can be expressed by adding a suffix to the verb.

An example for negative polarity: the negation form of the verb /aʁaʁ-/ (to go):

- /juɣ aʁaχ-tɨqɨχ-tɨ-χ/ (the man walks)
- /juɣ aʁaʁ-ɨ-tɨ-χ/ (the man does not walk)

===== Aspect =====
Grammatical aspect:

- /aftalʁa-qɨstaχ-/ (to work slowly) and /aftalʁa-qɨstaχ-tɨqɨχ-tɨ-χ/ (he works slowly), (Note: Suffix -/qɨstaχ-/ for slow action aspect.) from /aftalʁa-/ (to work)

===== Modality =====
Also linguistic modality can be expressed by suffixes. Modal verbs like "want to", "wish to" etc. do not even exist: (Note: Modality.)

Suffix -jux- (to want to):
/aftalʁaχ-/ (to work)	/aftalʁaʁ-jux-/ (to want to work)
/aftalʁaχ-tɨqɨχ-tɨ-ŋ/ (I work) (Note: Present tense.)	/aftalʁaʁ-jux-tɨqɨχ-tɨ-ŋ/ (I want to work)

The table illustrates also why Sirenik is treated as agglutinative (rather than fusional).

===== Voice =====
Four grammatical voices are mentioned in: (Note: Grammatical voices.)

active
passive
confer -/ɕi/- that variant of Siberian Yupik which is spoken by Ungazigmit
middle (medial)
causative
/malikam aʁaχ-ɕaχ-tɨqɨχ-tɨ-ʁa kɨtuɣi qurŋi-nu/ (Malika makes Kitugi go to the reindeer.)

all of them are expressed by agglutination, thus, no separate words are required.

=== Participles ===
A distinction between two kinds of participles (adverbial participle and adjectival participle) makes sense in Sireniki (just like in Hungarian, see határozói igenév and melléknévi igenév for detailed description of these concepts; or in Russian, see деепричастие and причастие).

Sireniki has many kinds of participles in both categories. In the following, they will be listed, grouped by the relation between the “dependent action” and “main action” (or by other meanings beyond this, e.g. modality) – following the terminology of Menovschikov (1964). A sentence with a participle can be imagined as simulating a subordinating compound sentence where the action described in the dependent clause relates somehow to the action described in the main clause. In English, an adverbial clause may express reason, purpose, condition, succession etc., and a relative clause can express many meanings, too.

In an analogous way, in Sireniki Eskimo language, the "dependent action" (expressed by the adverbial participle in the sentence element called adverbial, or expressed by the adjectival participle in the sentence element called attribute) relates somehow to the “main action” (expressed by the verb in the sentence element called predicate), and the participles will be listed below grouped by this relation (or by other meanings beyond this, e.g. modality).

==== Adverbial participles ====
They can be translated into English e.g. by using an appropriate adverbial clause. There are many of them, with various meanings.

An interesting feature: they can have person and number. The person of the dependent action need not coincide with that of the main action. An example (meant in the British English usage of “shall / should” in the 1st person: here, conveying only conditional, but no necessity or morality):

“I” versus “we”
/mɨŋa iŋɨjaxtɨk-t͡ʃɨ-ʁɨjɨqɨɣɨ-ma, ajvɨʁaʁjuʁuχtɨki/
If I were a marksman, we should kill walrus

Another example (with a different adverbial participle):

“he/she” versus “they”
/ɨ̆ l̥tɨʁinɨq ȷ̊an, upʃuχtɨqɨχtɨʁij/
when he/she sings, they keep frightening him/her

They will be discussed in more details below.

===== Reason, purpose or circumstance of action =====
An adverbial participle “explaining reason, purpose or circumstance of action” is expressed by suffix -/lɨ/- / -/ l̥ɨ/- (followed by appropriate person-number suffix). Examples: (Note: Adverbial participle -/lɨ/- / - /l̥ɨ/- “explaining reason, purpose or circumstance of action”.)

Persons	Sentence	
Persons	Adverbial participle	Verb
1st—1st	/jɨfkɨ-lɨ-ma	itχɨ-mɨ-t͡ʃɨ-ŋ/
1st—1st	(I) having stood up	I went in
3rd—3rd	/jɨfkɨ-lɨ-mi	itχɨ-mɨ-tɨ-χ/
3rd—3rd	(he/she) having stood up	he/she went in

Another example, with a somewhat different usage: (Note: Adverbial participle -/lɨ/- / -/ l̥ɨ/- “explaining reason, purpose or circumstance of action” exemplified in another usage.)

Adverbial participle	Verb
/nɨŋitu l̥ɨku	pɨjɨkɨŋa/
To examine him/her_{2} (another being)	he/she_{1} went

===== Dependent action ends just before main action begins =====
Using the adverbial participle -/ja/- / -/ɕa/-, the dependent action (expressed by the adverbial participle in the sentence element called adverbial) finishes just before the main action (expressed by the verb in the sentence element called predicate) begins. (Note: Adverbial participle -/ja/- / -/ɕa/- (dependent action ends just before main action begins).)

===== Dependent action begins before main action, but they continue together till end =====
It can be expressed by suffix -/inɨq ȷ̊a/-. Examples:

/nukɨ l̥piɣt͡ʃɨʁaʁɨm aninɨq ȷ̊ami qamt͡ʃɨni tiɣɨmɨra(x)/
the boy, going out [of the house], took his [own] sledge [with himself])

where

/nukɨ l̥piɣt͡ʃɨʁaʁɨm/
Phonology	Syntax	Semantics
/nuˈkɨ l̥piɣˈt͡ʃɨʁaχ/	noun	boy
-/ɨm/	case suffix	relative case

/aninɨq ȷ̊ami/
Phonology	Syntax	Semantics
/an/-	root	go out
-/inɨq ȷ̊a/-	the suffix of the adverbial participle	dependent action begins before main action, but they continue together till end
-/mi/	person-number suffix for adverbial participle in intransitive conjugation (Note: Intransitive conjugation of adverbial participles -/ja/- / -/ɕa/-, -/inɨq ȷ̊a/-.)	subject of singular 3rd person

/qamt͡ʃɨni/
Phonology	Syntax	Semantics
/ˈqamt͡ʃa/	noun	sled
-/ni/	possessive suffix for nouns	singular, 3rd person, self: “his/her own …”

/tiɣɨmɨra(x)/
Phonology	Syntax	Semantics
/tɨɣɨˈraχ/	verb	he/she took something
-/mɨ/- / -/ɨmɨ/-	tense suffix	past tense (not the “near past” one)

Another example:

/ɨ̆ l̥tɨʁinɨq ȷ̊an, upʃuχtɨqɨχtɨʁij/
when he/she sings, they keep frightening him/her

===== Conditional =====
Dependent action is conditional: it does not takes place, although it would (either really, or provided that some—maybe irreal—conditions would hold). Confer also conditional sentence.

Sireniki Eskimo has several adverbial participles to express that. (Note: Adverbial participles conveying conditional dependent action.) We can distinguish them according to the concerned condition (conveyed by the dependent action): it may be

- either real (possible to take place in the future)
- or irreal (it would take place only if some other irreal condition would hold)

====== Real ======
It is expressed with suffix -/qɨɣɨ/- / -/kɨɣɨ/-, let us see e.g. a paradigm beginning with /aʁa-qɨɣɨ-ma/ (if I get off / depart); /aʁa-qɨɣɨ-pi/ (if you get off / depart):

		Number	
		Singular	Plural
Person	1st	/aʁa-qɨɣɨ-ma/	/aʁa-qɨɣɨ-mta/
Person	2nd	/aʁa-qɨɣɨ-pi/	/aʁa-qɨɣɨ-pɨɕi/
Person	3rd	/aʁa-qɨɣɨ-mi/	/aʁa-qɨɣɨ-mɨŋ/

====== Irrealis ======
Compare with counterfactual conditional. Sireniki can compress it into an adverbial participle: it is expressed with suffix -/ɣɨjɨqɨɣɨ/- / -/majɨqɨɣɨ/-.

The dependent action is expressed with an adverbial participle. The main action is conveyed by the verb. If also the main action is conditional (a typical usage), than it can be expressed with a verb of conditional mood. The persons need not coincide.

An example (meant in the British English usage of “shall / should” in the 1st person: here, conveying only conditional, but no necessity or morality):

/mɨŋa iŋɨjaxtɨk-t͡ʃɨ-ʁɨjɨqɨɣɨ-ma, ajvɨʁaʁjuʁuχtɨki/
If I were a marksman, we should kill walrus.

The example in details:

Dependent action:

/iŋɨjaxtɨk-t͡ʃɨ-ʁɨjɨqɨɣɨ-ma/ (if I were a marksman)
Phonology	Syntax	Semantics
/iŋˈɨːjaxta/	noun	marksman
-/t͡ʃɨ/-	suffix building a verb out of a noun	predicative form of noun
-/ɣɨjɨqɨɣɨ/- / -/majɨqɨɣɨ/-	the suffix of the adverbial participle	irreal condition
-/ma/	person-number suffix for adverbial participles in the intransitive conjugation	subject 1st person

==== Adjectival participles ====
There are several kinds of adjectival participles.

- /imtuɡnu aʁaqt͡ʃɨχ qɨmɨ l̥ɨʁaχ utɨχt͡ʃɨmɨt͡ʃɨχ/: "The sledge [that went to Imtuk] returned."
- /juɣ qavɨ l̥ɨʁɨχ nɨŋɨsɨmɨrɨqa/: "I saw [perceived] a sleeping man."

They can be used not only attributively, as in the above examples, but also predicatively:{efn|Attribute versus predicative usage of adjectival participles.

- /juɣ qavɨ l̥ɨʁɨχ/: The man is sleeping.

===== Modality =====
The djectival participle -/kajux/ / -/qajux/ conveys a meaning "able to", related rather to modality than to the relation of dependent action and main action). (Note: Adjectival participle -/kajux/ / -/qajux/ (able to).)

- /taŋaʁaχ pijɨkajux pijɨxtɨqɨχtɨχ l̥mɨnɨŋ/: "A child who is able to walk moves around spontaneously."

== Syntax ==
Like many Eskimoan languages, Sireniki is an ergative–absolutive language. For English-language materials treating this feature of Sireniki, see Nikolai Vakhtin (2000).

== See also ==
- Siberian Yupik
- Eskimo
- Ergative–absolutive language
- Transitive verb
- Intransitive verb
- Polysynthetic language
- Incorporation (linguistics)
- Language death
