= Inuttitut =

Inuktitut dialect of Labrador, Canada

- Nunatsiavummiutitut, Labrador Inuktitut
- Native to: Canada
- Region: Labrador
- Language family: Eskaleut: Eskimo; Inuit / Inuktut; Inuktitut; Inuttitut
- Early forms: Proto-Eskimo–Aleut: Proto-Eskimo; Proto-Inuit
- Dialects: Northern; Southern
- Writing system: Latin

Language codes
- ISO 639-3: –
- Glottolog: nuna1235
- Inuit dialects. Nunatsiavummiutitut is the magenta in the east.

- Nunatsiavummiutitut is classified as Definitely Endangered by the UNESCO Atlas of the World's Languages in Danger.

Inuttitut, Inuttut, or Nunatsiavummiutitut is a dialect of Inuktitut. It is spoken across northern Labrador by the Inuit, whose traditional lands are known as Nunatsiavut.

The language has a distinct writing system, created in Greenland in the 1760s by German missionaries from the Moravian Church. This separate writing tradition, the remoteness of Nunatsiavut from other Inuit communities, and its unique history of cultural contacts have made it into a distinct dialect with a separate literary tradition.

It shares features, including Schneider's Law, the reduction of alternate sequences of consonant clusters by simplification, with some Inuit dialects spoken in Quebec. It is differentiated by the tendency to neutralize velars and uvulars, i.e. /ɡ/ ~ /r/, and /k/ ~ /q/ in word final and pre-consonantal positions, as well as by the assimilation of consonants in clusters, compared to other dialects. Morphological systems (~juk/~vuk) and syntactic patterns (e.g. the ergative) have similarly diverged. Nor are the Labrador dialects uniform: there are separate variants traceable to a number of regions, e.g. Rigolet, Nain, Hebron, etc.

Although Nunatsiavut claims over 4,000 inhabitants of Inuit descent, only 550 reported any Inuit language (Inuktut) to be their mother tongue in the 2001 census, mostly in the town of Nain. Inuttitut is seriously endangered.

== Dialects ==
At one time, there existed two dialects of the Inuttut language. The northern dialect (spoken mainly in Nain) and the southern dialect (spoken only by a few elders in Rigolet). They differ only in phonology.

== Alphabet ==
Nunatsiavut uses a Latin alphabet devised by German-speaking Moravian missionaries, which includes the letter ĸ (kra, often also written with an uppercase K). In 1980, the Labrador Inuit Standardized Writing System was developed during a meeting with elders and educators to provide consistency and clarity. The previous orthography used ⟨o⟩ to represent /u/ before uvulars; however, the Labrador Inuttitut no longer has a distinct /q/ at the end of syllables. In the new orthography, ⟨o⟩ represents /uu/.

Capital letters
Â	A	E	F	G	H	I	J	K	Kʼ	L	M	N	O	P	R	S	T	U	V	W
Lowercase letters
â	a	e	f	g	h	i	j	k	ĸ	l	m	n	o	p	r	s	t	u	v	w

The main difference with the Latin orthography used for other Inuktitut dialects are the following letters:

- /aː/ â = aa
- /iː/ e = ii
- /uː/ o = uu
- /χ/ ĸ = q
- /ŋŋ/ ng, n̲g̲ or ngng = nng

== Vocabulary comparison ==
The comparison of some animal names in the two dialects of Inuktitut:

Inuktitut	Inuttitut	meaning
siksik ᓯᒃᓯᒃ	sitsik	ground squirrel
qugjuk ᖃᒡᔪᒃ	ĸutjuk	tundra swan
aarluk ᐋᕐᓗᒃ	âlluk	killer whale
amaruq ᐊᒪᕈᖅ	amaguk	grey wolf
isunngaq ᐃᓱᙵᖅ	isungak	pomarine jaeger
kanguq ᑲᖑᖅ	kangak	snow goose
tuktu ᑐᒃᑐ	tuttuk	caribou
tiriganniaq ᑎᕆᒐᓐᓂᐊᖅ	tigiganniak	arctic fox
umingmak ᐅᒥᖕᒪᒃ	umimmak	muskox

== German loanwords ==
The German loanwords used in Inuttitut date from the period of the German missionaries of Moravian Church (1760s).

- ailvat (< Ger. elf) 'eleven'
- ainsik (< Ger. eins) 'one o'clock'
- fiarâ (< Ger. vier) 'four o'clock'
- Fraitâg ( < Ger. Freitag) 'Friday'
- kâttopalak (< Ger. Kartoffel) 'potato'
- Metvog (< Ger. Mittwoch) 'Wednesday'
- Montâg (< Ger. Montag) 'Monday'
- naina (< Ger. neun) 'nine'
- sâksit (< Ger. sechs) 'six'
- senat (< Ger. zehn) 'ten'
- sepat (< Ger. sieben) 'seven'
- silipa (< Ger. Silber) 'coin'
- situnati (< Ger. Stunde) 'hour'
- Sontâg (< Ger. Sonntag) 'Sunday'
- Sunâpint (< Ger. Sonnabend) 'Saturday'
- suvai (< Ger. zwei) 'two'
- suvailva (< Ger. zwölf) 'twelve'
- tarai (< Ger. drei) 'three'
- taraitijik (< Ger. dreißig) '30 odd 30 rifle and ammunition'
- Tenistâg (< Ger. Dienstag) 'Tuesday'
- Tonistâg (< Ger. Donnerstag) 'Thursday'
- viaga (< Ger. vier) 'four'
- vogik (< Ger. Woche) 'week'
