= Natsilingmiutut =

Inuit language

Natchilingmiutut
- ᓇᑦᕠᓕᖕᒥᐅᑐᑦ
- Native to: Canada
- Region: Western Nunavut
- Ethnicity: Netsilik Inuit
- Language family: Eskaleut: Eskimo; Inuit; Inuvialuktun; Natchilingmiutut
- Early forms: Proto-Eskimo–Aleut: Proto-Eskimo; Proto-Inuit

Language codes
- ISO 639-3: –
- Glottolog: nets1241
- Inuit dialects. (Broader) Netsilik is the dark green in the centre.

- Natsilingmiutut is classified as Vulnerable by the UNESCO Atlas of the World's Languages in Danger

Natchilingmiutut (ᓇᑦᕠᓕᖕᒥᐅᑐᑦ), Netsilik /ˌnɛtˈsɪlɪk/, Natsilik, Nattilik, Netsilingmiut, Natsilingmiutut, Nattilingmiutut, or Nattiliŋmiutut is an Inuit language variety spoken in western Nunavut, Canada, by Netsilik Inuit.

Natchilingmiutut (ᓇᑦᕠᓕᖕᒥᐅᑐᑦ 'people from Natchilik') came from natsik 'seal' + postbase -lik 'place with something' + postbase -miut 'inhabitants of'.

== Classification ==
- There are three main dialect divisions of Natsilingmiutut dialect:
  - Natsilik subdialect, or Natsilik/Netsilik proper
  - Arviligjuaq subdialect
  - Illuiliq subdialect

== Special letters ==
Natsilik dialect has the special letters: ⟨š ř ŋ⟩, used by some Nattiliŋmiut speakers. New encodings in Unicode were proposed for the Inuktitut syllabics corresponding to h and š: 𑪴 ha, 𑪰 hi, 𑪲 hu, and 𑪺 ša, 𑪶 ši, 𑪸 šu, and their long counterparts with a dot above 𑪵 haa, 𑪱 hii, 𑪳 huu, and 𑪻 šaa, 𑪷 šii, 𑪹 šuu. These 12 syllabic characters for Nattilingmiutut were included in version 14.0 of the Unicode Standard on 14 September 2021, are now formally part of the Standard, and are stable to use for digital text exchange. However, updates to system level syllabics fonts and keyboards to access the characters are underway and forthcoming.

š [ʂ] – also written as ⟨sr⟩ or ⟨shr⟩, it sounds a bit like English "shr" and is distinct from both the s sound that is used in words borrowed from English and the more common h sound.

ᐅᖅ𑪸ᖅᑑᖅ Uqšuqtuuq 'Gjoa Haven'
ᒥᒃ𑪻ᓄᑦ mikšaanut 'about'
ᓯᒃ𑪶ᒃ hikšik 'ground squirrel, marmot'

ř [ɟ] (in Inuktitut syllabics ᖬ řa ᖨ ři ᖪ řu ᖭ řaa ᖩ řii ᖫ řuu) – sounds like an English (retroflex) r. It is distinct from the r sound used by other dialects, which is closer to the r [ʁ] sound made in French at the back of the throat.

ᐃᖨ iři 'eye' (cf. Inuktitut ᐃᔨ iji)
ᐅᒡᖪᒃ ugřuk 'bearded seal' (cf. Inuktitut ᐅᒡᔪᒃ ugjuq)
ᑭᐅᖪᖅ kiuřuq 's/he replies, answers' (cf. Inuktitut ᑭᐅᔪᖅ kiujuq)
ᐊᐱᕆᖪᖅ apiriřuq 's/he asks' (cf. Inuktitut ᐊᐱᕆᔪᖅ apirijuq)

ŋ – A small number of Inuktitut-speakers use this character instead of ng. The use of ng is deceiving because it makes use of two letters to represent what is a single sound. In syllabics this sound is represented by a single character ᖕ. Using this letter also makes the distinction between the sequence [nŋ] and long [ŋː] clearer, the first being spelled nŋ (ᓐᖕ) and the latter ŋŋ (ᖖ). In eastern varieties of Inuktitut which do not have the sequence [nŋ], long [ŋː] is spelled nng (ᖖ) rather than ngng (ᖕᖕ). When the letter ŋ is not used, the distinction may be made by spelling [nŋ] n'ng and [ŋː] nng.

ᐊᕕᓐᖓᖅ avinŋuaq (avin'nguaq) 'lemming'
ᑭᙵᖅ kiŋŋaq (kinngaq) 'mountain'

== Comparison ==
Inuinnaqtun	Nattiliŋmiut	Kivallirmiut	Aggurmiut (North Baffin)	Uqqurmiut (South Baffin)	Kalaallisut	meaning
niriyuq (ᓂᕆᔪᖅ)	niriřuq ᓂᕆᖪᖅ	nirijuq ᓂᕆᔪᖅ	nirijuq ᓂᕆᔪᖅ	nirijuq ᓂᕆᔪᖅ	nerivoq	s/he eats
ihumayuq (ᐃᓱᒪᔪᖅ)	ihumařuq ᐃᓱᒪᖪᖅ	ihumajuq ᐃᓱᒪᔪᖅ	isumajuq ᐃᓱᒪᔪᖅ	isumajuq ᐃᓱᒪᔪᖅ	isumavoq	s/he thinks
pingahut (ᐱᖓᓱᑦ)	piŋahut ᐱᖓᓱᑦ	pingahut ᐱᖓᓱᑦ	pingasut ᐱᖓᓱᑦ	pingasut ᐱᖓᓱᑦ	pingasut	three
akhunaaq (ᐊᒃᓱᓈᖅ)	akłunaaq ᐊᒃᖢᓈᖅ	akłunaaq ᐊᒃᖢᓈᖅ	akłunaaq ᐊᒃᖢᓈᖅ	atsunaaq, attunaaq ᐊᑦᓱᓈᖅ, ᐊᑦᑐᓈᖅ	allunaa(sa)q	rope
uqhuq (ᐅᖅᓱᖅ)	uqšuq ᐅᖅᓱᖅ	uqhuq ᐅᖅᓱᖅ	uqsuq ᐅᖅᓱᖅ	uqsuq ᐅᖅᓱᖅ	orsoq	fat, blubber
quana (ᖁᐊᓇ)	qujanaqqutit ᖁᔭᓇᖅᑯᑎᑦ	ma’na ᒪ'ᓇ	qujannamiik ᖁᔭᓐᓇᒦᒃ	nakurmiik ᓇᑯᕐᒦᒃ	qujanaq	thank you
imannaq (ᐃᒪᓐᓇᖅ)	iiq ᐄᖅ	nauk ᓇᐅᒃ	aakka ᐋᒃᑲ	aagga ᐋᒡᒐ	naagga	no
hiqiniq (ᓯᕿᓂᖅ)	hiqiniq ᓯᕿᓂᖅ	hiqiniq ᓯᕿᓂᖅ	siqiniq ᓯᕿᓂᖅ	siqiniq ᓯᕿᓂᖅ	seqineq	sun
ublaaq (ᐅᑉᓛᖅ)	ublaaq ᐅᑉᓛᖅ	ublaaq ᐅᑉᓛᖅ	ullaaq ᐅᓪᓛᖅ	ullaaq ᐅᓪᓛᖅ	ullaaq	morning
qablu (ᖃᑉᓗ)	qablu ᖃᑉᓗ	qablu ᖃᑉᓗ	qallu ᖃᓪᓗ	qallu ᖃᓪᓗ	qallu	eyebrow
