= Aivilingmiutut =

Canadian dialect of Inuit

Aivilik
- Aivilingmiutut
- Native to: Canada
- Region: Aivilik, Nunavut
- Ethnicity: Aivilingmiut
- Language family: Eskaleut: Eskimo; Inuit; (variously considered Inuvialuktun or Inuktitut); Aivilik
- Early forms: Proto-Eskimo–Aleut: Proto-Eskimo; Proto-Inuit

Language codes
- ISO 639-3: –
- Linguist List: ike-aiv
- Glottolog: None
- Inuit dialects. Aivilik is the dark blue to the west of Hudson Bay.

- Aivilingmiutut is classified as Vulnerable by the UNESCO Atlas of the World's Languages in Danger.

Aivilik, also known as Aivilingmiutut, Aivilimmiutut, Aivillirmiut, and Kangiqłniq, is a Canadian dialect of the Inuit language spoken along the northwestern shores of Hudson Bay in Nunavut. The governments of Nunavut and the Northwest Territories generally consider it to be a dialect of Inuktitut, due to its location in Nunavut, as do some linguists, but it is instead sometimes classified as a dialect of Inuvialuk. However, Inuktitut and Inuvialuk form a dialect continuum with few sharp boundaries.
