= North Baffin dialect =

Inuktitut dialect of Nunavut, Canada

North Baffin
- Qikiqtaaluk uannangani, Iglulingmiut
- Native to: Canada
- Region: Nunavut
- Language family: Eskaleut: Eskimo; Inuit; (variously considered Inuktitut or Inuvialuktun); North Baffin
- Early forms: Proto-Eskimo–Aleut: Proto-Eskimo; Proto-Inuit

Language codes
- ISO 639-3: –
- Glottolog: baff1240 all Baffin dialects
- Inuit dialects. North Baffin is the powder blue to the north of Hudson Bay.

The North Baffin dialect (Qikiqtaaluk uannangani or Iglulingmiut) of Inuktitut is spoken on the northern part of Baffin Island, at Igloolik and the adjacent part of the Melville Peninsula, and in other Inuit communities in the far north of Nunavut, like Resolute, Grise Fiord, Pond Inlet, Clyde River, and Arctic Bay.

The governments of Nunavut and the Northwest Territories generally consider it to be a dialect of Inuktitut, due to its location in Nunavut, as do some linguists, but it is instead sometimes classified as a dialect of Inuvialuktun. However, Inuktitut and Inuvialuktun form a dialect continuum with few sharp boundaries.

The North Baffin dialect is the spoken in the film Atanarjuat: The Fast Runner.
