= Kivalliq dialect =

Dialect of Eastern Canadian Inuktitut

Kivalliq
- Caribou
- Kivallirmiutut
- Native to: Canada
- Region: coastal Kivalliq Region, Nunavut
- Language family: Eskaleut: Eskimo; Inuit; (variously considered Inuvialuktun or Inuktitut); Kivalliq
- Early forms: Proto-Eskimo–Aleut: Proto-Eskimo; Proto-Inuit

Language codes
- ISO 639-3: –
- Glottolog: cari1277
- Inuit dialects. Kivalliq is the lighter green to the west of Hudson Bay.

- Kivallirmiutut is classified as Vulnerable by the UNESCO Atlas of the World's Languages in Danger

Kivalliq, also known as Kivallirmiutut, Caribou Eskimo, or formerly as Keewatin, is a dialect of Eastern Canadian Inuktitut which is spoken along the northwestern shores of Hudson Bay in Nunavut.

== Location ==
The Kivalliq dialect is most commonly spoken in five Canadian communities: Chesterfield Inlet, Baker Lake, Rankin Inlet, Whale Cove, and Arviat. Baker Lake and Arviat are the only two communities in Canada that speak Kivalliq as the sole dialect of Inuktitut. Most speakers of Kivalliq are located in the Eastern Nunavut community of Arviat, with approximately 90% of the population speaking Kivalliq as their mother tongue.

== Dialect group ==
Kivalliq dialect is part of the subgroup Keewatin, within the broader dialect group of Eastern Canadian Inuktitut.

=== Subdialects ===
Kivalliq has several subdialects: Qairnirmiut, Hauniqtuurmiut, Paallirmiut, and Ahiarmiut.

== Writing system ==
Kivalliq uses Inuktitut Syllabics as a writing system. Syllabics is the most common Inuktitut writing system across Nunavut and Nunavik. There is no uniform writing system in place for all dialects of Inuktitut, which can be explained by the sporadic introduction of missionaries to Nunavut in the 1800s. It is commonly accepted that Edmund Peck introduced Inuktitut Syllabics to the Inuit, based on his travels as a missionary in Nunavut.

== Language vitality status ==
According UNESCO Atlas of the World's Languages in Danger, the Kivalliq dialect of Inuktitut is classified as vulnerable.

== Government policy ==
The Government of Nunavut has made efforts to protect the use of Kivalliq under Canadian law with the Consolidation of Official Languages Act and the Indigenous Languages Act. Under the Consolidation of Official Languages Act, Inuktitut became an official language of Nunavut. The first official implementation of the Indigenous Languages Act occurred in 2019 with the Revitalizing and Strengthening Inuktitut in Nunavut Program, as a collaborative effort between The Government of Canada, the Government of Nunavut, and Nunavut Tunngavik Incorporated. Major revitalization efforts within this program include introducing a laddered approach to language education in Nunavut, such that language certification, diplomas, and BEds can be achieved in Inuktitut language.
