= Eskaleut languages =

Language family of the Arctic and sub-Arctic

Eskaleut
- Eskimo–Aleut, Inuit–Yupik–Unangan
- Geographic distribution: Alaska, Northwest Territories (Inuvialuit Settlement Region), Nunavut, northern Quebec (Nunavik), northern Labrador (Nunatsiavut), Greenland, far eastern Russia (Chukotka Peninsula)
- Linguistic classification: One of the world's primary language families
- Proto-language: Proto-Eskaleut
- Subdivisions: Eskimoan (Inuit, Yupik); Aleut

Language codes
- ISO 639-5: esx
- Glottolog: eski1264
- Eskaleut languages are spoken in Russia, Alaska, Canada and Greenland.

The Eskaleut (/ɛˈskæljuːt/ e-SKAL-yoot), Eskimo–Aleut or Inuit–Yupik–Unangan languages are a language family native to the northern portions of the North American continent, and a small part of northeastern Asia. Languages in the family are indigenous to parts of what are now the United States (Alaska); Canada (Inuit Nunangat), including Nunavut, Northwest Territories (principally in the Inuvialuit Settlement Region), northern Quebec (Nunavik), and northern Labrador (Nunatsiavut); Greenland; and the Russian Far East (Chukchi Peninsula). The language family is also known as Eskaleutian, or Eskaleutic.

The language family is divided into two branches. The first branch encompasses all Eskimoan languages (Inuit and Yupik languages). The second branch consists of a single language, Aleut, spoken in the Aleutian Islands and the Pribilof Islands. Aleut is divided into several dialects. The Yupik languages are spoken in western and southwestern Alaska and in Chukotka, while the Inuit languages are spoken in northern Alaska, Canada and Greenland. Inuit languages are divided into several varieties. Neighbouring varieties are a dialect continuum, although those at the farthest distances from the centre in the Diomede Islands and East Greenland are quite divergent.

The proper place of one language, Sirenik, within the language family has not been settled. While some linguists list it as a branch of Yupik, others list it as a separate branch of the Eskimoan family, alongside the Yupik and Inuit languages.

== History ==
The Eskaleut languages are among the native languages of the Americas. They are not demonstrably related to the other language families of North America and are believed to represent the Thule people, a separate, and the last, prehistoric migration of people from Asia. The Alaska Native Language Center believes that the ancestral Eskaleut language divided into the Eskimoan and Aleut branches at least 4,000 years ago. The Eskimoan language family split into the Yupik and Inuit branches around 1,000 years ago. More recent classifications find a third branch, Sirenik (Old Sirenik).

Alexander Vovin (2015) notes that northern Tungusic languages, which are spoken in eastern Siberia and northeastern China, have Eskaleut loanwords that are not found in Southern Tungusic, implying that Eskaleut was once much more widely spoken in eastern Siberia. Vovin (2015) estimates that the Eskaleut loanwords in Northern Tungusic had been borrowed no more than 2,000 years ago, which was when Tungusic was spreading northwards from its homeland in the middle reaches of the Amur River. Vovin (2015) concludes that the homeland (Urheimat) of Proto-Eskaleut was in Siberia rather than in Alaska.

== Internal classification ==
- Eskaleut
  - Aleut
  - Eskimoan
    - Sirenik †
    - Yupik
      - Alutiiq
      - Central Alaskan Yupʼik
      - Naukan
      - Central Siberian Yupik
    - Inuit
      - Iñupiaq
      - Inuvialuktun
      - Inuktitut
      - Greenlandic

- Eskaleut
  - Aleut (Unangam Tunuu) (40–80 speakers)
    - Western–Central dialects: Atkan, Attuan † (1997), Bering † (2021), Unangan
    - Eastern dialects: Unalaskan, Pribilof
  - Eskimoan
    - Sirenik (Uqeghllistun) † (1997)
    - Yupik or Western Eskimoan
      - Alutiiq or Pacific Gulf Yupik (c. 80 speakers)
        - Koniag Alutiiq (Alutiit'stun)
        - Chugach Alutiiq (Sugt'stun)
      - Central Alaskan Yupʼik (5,000 speakers ±50%)
        - General Central Alaskan Yupʼik (Yugtun)
        - Chevak Cupʼik (Cugtun)
        - Nunivak Cupʼig (Cugtun) (5–25 speakers)
      - Naukan (Nuvuqaghmiistun) (70 speakers)
      - Central Siberian Yupik (Yuit/Yupigestun) ("Yuit" in Russia, "Yupigestun" in Alaska; Chaplino and St. Lawrence Island)
        - Chaplino (Chaplinski) Yupik (Ungazighmiistun) (ca. 200 speakers)
        - St. Lawrence Island Yupik (Sivuqaghmiistun) (400–750 speakers)
    - Inuit or Eastern Eskimoan (c. 100,000 speakers)
      - Iñupiaq or Inupiat (northern Alaska, 5,000 speakers ±50%)
        - Qawiaraq or Seward Peninsula Inupiaq
        - Inupiatun/Iñupiatun or Northern Alaska Inupiaq (including Uummarmiutun (Aklavik, Inuvik))
      - Inuvialuktun (western Canada; 1,020 speakers, 2016 census)
        - Siglitun (Paulatuk, Sachs Harbour, Tuktoyaktuk)
        - Inuinnaqtun (in Ulukhaktok also known as Kangiryuarmiutun)
        - Natsilingmiutut (Netsilik area, Nunavut)
      - Inuktitut (eastern Canada; 36,000 speakers, 2016 census)
        - Inuttitut or Nunatsiavummiutut (Nunatsiavut, 550 speakers)
        - Nunavimmiutitut (Nunavik)
        - Qikiqtaaluk nigiani (South Baffin)
        - Qikiqtaaluk uannangani or Iglulingmiut (North Baffin)
        - Aivilingmiutut (east-central Nunavut)
        - Kivallirmiutut (Southeast Nunavut)
        - Inuktun or Avanersuaq (Polar Eskimo, Greenland, 800 speakers)
      - Greenlandic (Greenland: 50,000 speakers Greenland, 7,000 Denmark)
        - Kalaallisut (West Greenlandic, 44,000 speakers)
        - Tunumiisut (East Greenlandic, 3,000 speakers)

== Position among the world's language families ==
Eskaleut does not have any proven genetic relationship to any of the world's other language families. There is general agreement that it is not closely related to the other language families of North America. The more credible proposals on the external relations of Eskaleut all concern one or more of the language families of northern Eurasia, such as Chukotko-Kamchatkan just across the Bering Strait. One of the first such proposals, the Eskimo–Uralic hypothesis, was suggested by the pioneering Danish linguist Rasmus Rask in 1818, upon noticing similarities between Greenlandic and Finnish. Eskimo-Uralic is the oldest proposal which connects the Eskaleut languages to other language families, having been suggested soon after European contacts with Inuit. Perhaps the most fully developed proposal to date is Michael Fortescue's Uralo–Siberian hypothesis, published in 1998 which links Eskaleut languages to Yukaghir and the Uralic languages. Fortescue's observations have been evaluated by specialists with a limited degree of positivity but are viewed as scattered evidence and still remain highly speculative and unproven and the soundness of the reconstructed common ancestors is challenging to evaluate.

Joseph Greenberg suggested grouping Eskaleut with all of the language families of northern Eurasia (Indo-European, Uralic, Altaic, Korean, Japanese, Ainu, Nivkh/Gilayak, and Chukchi–Kamchatkan), with the exception of Yeniseian, in a proposed language family called Eurasiatic. Criticisms have been made stating that Greenberg's hypothesis is ahistorical, meaning that it lacks and sacrifices known historical elements of language in favour of external similarities. Although the Eurasiatic hypothesis is generally disregarded by linguists, one critique by Stefan Georg and Alexander Vovin stated that they were not willing to disregard the theory immediately although ultimately agreed that Greenberg's conclusion was dubious. Greenberg explicitly states that his developments were based on the previous macro-comparative work done by Vladislav Illich-Svitych and Bomhard and Kerns. By providing evidence of lexical comparison, Greenberg hoped that it would strengthen his hypothesis.

In the 1960s Morris Swadesh suggested a connection with the Wakashan languages. This was expanded by Jan Henrik Holst (2005).

== Notable features ==
Every word must have only one root (free morpheme), always at the beginning. Eskaleut languages have a relatively small number of roots: in the case of Central Alaskan Yup'ik, around two thousand. Following the root are a number of postbases, which are bound morphemes that add to the basic meaning of the root. If the meaning of the postbase is to be expressed alone, a special neutral root (in the case of Central Alaskan Yup'ik and Inuktitut pi) is used.

The basic word schema is as follows: root-(affixes)-inflection-(enclitic). Below is an example from Central Siberian Yupik.

angyagh-(gh)lla-ng(e)-yug-tuq-lu
boat-big-acquire-want.to-IND.3S-also
‘also, he wants to acquire a big boat’

There are a total of three affixes internal to the word angyagh. The root (or free morpheme) angyagh and the inflection -tuq on the right consist of the indicative mood marker plus third person singular. The enclitic –lu ‘also’ follows the inflection.

Following the postbases are non-lexical suffixes that indicate case on nouns and person and mood on verbs. The number of cases varies, with Aleut languages having a greatly reduced case system compared to Eskimoan. The Eskimoan languages are ergative–absolutive in nouns and in Yup'ik languages, also in verbal person marking. All Eskaleut languages have obligatory verbal agreement with agent and patient in transitive clauses, and there are special suffixes used for this purpose in subordinate clauses, which makes these languages, like most in the North Pacific, highly complement deranking.

At the end of a word there can be one of a small number of clitics with meanings such as "but" or indicating a polar question.

Phonologically, the Eskaleut languages resemble other language families of northern North America (Na-Dene and Tsimshianic) and far-eastern Siberia (Chukotko-Kamchatkan). There are usually only three vowels—/a/, /i/, /u/—though some Yup'ik dialects also have /ə/. All Eskaleut languages lack both ejectives and aspirates, in which they resemble the Siberian languages more than the North American ones. Eskaleut languages possess voiceless plosives at four positions (bilabial, coronal, velar and uvular) in all languages except Aleut, which has lost the bilabial stops (though it has retained the nasal). There are usually contrasting voiced and voiceless fricatives at the same positions, and in the Eskimoan subfamily a voiceless alveolar lateral fricative is also present. A rare feature of many dialects of Yup'ik and Aleut is contrasting voiceless nasals.

== Phonology ==
=== Eskimoan ===
The following vowels and consonants were taken from Michael Fortescue et al., 2010.

==== Vowels ====
Eskimoan ə corresponds to Aleut i.

	Front	Central	Back
Close	i	ɨ	u
Mid		ə	
Open		a	

==== Consonants ====
Inuit allows only a single initial consonant and no more than two successive consonants between vowels.

Yupik exhibits no consonant assimilation process so common to Inuit.

Consonants in parentheses are non-Proto-Eskimoan phonemes.

		Labial	Alveolar			Velar	Uvular	Glottal
		Labial	Plain	Palatalized	Lateral	Velar	Uvular	Glottal
Nasal		m (m̥)	n (n̥)	(nʲ)^{[1]}		ŋ (ŋ̊)		
Plosive		p	t	tʲ		k	q	
Affricate			ts^{[2]}					
Fricative	Voiceless	(f) (w̥)	ts^{[2]}	s (s̆)	(ɬ)	(x)	(χ)	(h)
Fricative	Voiced	v (w)	ð	(z) (z̆)		ɣ	ʁ	
Trill			^{[3]}				(ʀ̃)	
Approximant				j^{[4]}	l			

=== Aleut ===
The following vowels and consonants were taken from Knut Bergsland, (1997).

==== Vowels ====
The Aleut language has six vowels in total: three short vowels /i/, /u/, /a/, and three long vowels /iː/, /uː/, /aː/. Orthographically, they would be spelled ii, uu, and aa. There are no diphthongs in Aleut vowels. The length of the vowel is dependent upon three characteristics: stress, surrounding consonants, and in particularly Eastern Aleut, surrounding vowels. Short vowels are in initial position if a following consonant is velar or labial. For example: the demonstratives uka, ika, and aka.

Long vowels are lower than their short counterpart vowels, but are less retracted if they make contact with a uvular consonant. For example: uuquchiing 'blue fox', qiiqix̂ 'storm-petrel', and qaaqaan 'eat it!'

	Front	Central	Back
Close	i iː		u uː
Open		a aː	

==== Consonants ====
The Aleut consonants featured below include single Roman letters, digraphs, and one trigraph. Phonemes in parentheses are found only in Russian and English loanwords, the phoneme in italics is found only in Eastern Aleut, and the bold phonemes are a part of the standard Aleut inventory.

Aleut has no native labial stops and allows clusters of up to three consonants as well as consonant clusters in word initial position.

Cross-linguistically rare phonological features include voiceless nasals and absence of a /p/.

	Labial		Dental		Alveolar	Palatal		Velar		Uvular		Glottal
Plosive	p (p)	b (b)	t t	d (d)	t̺͡s̺ tʳ*	tʃ tj		k k	ɡ (g)	q q		
Fricative	f (f)	v v*	θ hd	ð d		s s	z z	x x	ɣ g	χ x̂	ʁ ĝ	
Nasal	m̥ hm	m m	n̥ hn	n n				ŋ̊ hŋ	ŋ ŋ			
Lateral			ɬ hl	l l								
Approximant	ʍ hw	w w			ɹ, ɾ (r)	ç hy	j y					h h

== Morphology ==
=== Language type ===
==== Polysynthetic language ====
Eskaleut is polysynthetic, which features a process in which a single word is able to contain multiple post-bases or morphemes. The Eskaleut languages are exclusively suffixing (with the exception of one prefix in Inuktitut that appears in demonstratives). Suffixes are able to combine and ultimately create an unlimited number of words. Some of the morphemes that are able to attach contain features such as carrying nominal subjects and objects, adverbial information, direct objects, and spatial noun phrases. Polysynthetic languages are said to be a form of extreme agglutination, which allows single words to carry the same information that another language expresses in whole clauses. For example, in Central Alaskan Yupik, one can say:

qayar- pa- li- qa- sqe- ssaage- llru- aqa
kayak- big- make- POL-EV- A.ask- but- PAST- 1SG/3SG.IND
I asked him to make a big kayak. (but actually he has not made it yet)

As a polysynthetic language, Eskaleut is concerned with what "each morpheme means, which categories it can attach to, whether there is any category change, etc. and what type of morphophonological effect occurs to the left as it attaches to the stem".

==== Morphosyntactic alignment ====
Eskimoan languages are ergative–absolutive. This means subjects of intransitive verbs and objects of transitive verbs are marked with the absolutive case, while subjects of transitive verbs are marked with the ergative case.

Aleut is not an ergative–absolutive language. It does not matter if the verb is transitive or intransitive—subjects and objects are not marked differently.

If a transitive object or an object of possession is openly communicated, ergative case marking will not be expressed. If a transitive object or object of possession is not openly communicated, then ergative case marking will be expressed.

== Syntax ==
Eskaleut languages follow the basic word order of subject–object–verb (SOV).

The syntax of Eskaleut is concerned with the functional use of its morphological structure. The two language branches, although part of the same family, have separated and detached themselves in relation to grammatical similarities. Bergsland states that Aleut, which was once a language more similar to Proto-Eskimoan than the current Eskimoan languages themselves, has distanced itself from the ancient language.

The case inflections, "relative *-m, instrumental *-mEk/meN, and locative *-mi have undergone phonological merger and led to a completely different explanation of ergative morphology in Proto-Eskimoan.

In order to further explain the profound changes that have occurred in Aleutian syntax, Bergsland proposed the Domino Effect, which is ultimately the chronological order of Aleut’s unique features. Below is a step by step list of the 'domino effect':

The Domino Effect:

1. The phonological reduction of final syllables and the ensuing syncretism of locative, relative, and instrumental case markers;
2. The collapse of the ergative system and of the distinction between relative and locative case in postpositional constructions;
3. The development of the unusual Aleut anaphoric reference system from the debris of this collapse, going hand in hand with a strict fixation of SOV word order;
4. The simple 3rd person forms when the original morphemes began to refer to any anaphoric (non-overt) referent, and;
5. The spread of such a referent's own number (including that of a possessor of some overt argument) to the final verb of the (complex) sentence, overriding agreement with the subject.

== Vocabulary comparison ==
The following is a comparison of cognates among the basic vocabulary across the Eskaleut language family (about 122 words). Note that empty cells do not imply that a particular language is lacking a word to describe the concept, but rather that the word for the concept in that language is formed from another stem and is not a cognate with the other words in the row. Also, there may be shifts in the meaning from one language to another, and so the "common meaning" given is only approximate. In some cases the form given is found only in some dialects of the language. Forms are given in native Latin orthographies unless otherwise noted.

Cognates of the Eskimoan languages can be found in Michael Fortescue et al., 2010.

Cognates of the Aleut language can be found in Knut Bergsland, 1997.

Persons

Common meaning	Aleut	Proto-Eskimoan	Sirenik	Siberian Yupik	Alutiiq	Yup'ik	Seward Inupiaq	Qawiaraq	Malimiutun	North Slope	Uummarmiutun	Siglitun	Inuinnaqtun	Natsilik	Kivalliq	Aivilik	North Baffin	South Baffin	Nunavik	Labrador Inuttut	North Greenlandic	West Greenlandic	East Greenlandic
boy	hlax	*aleqa	nukeɫpegaẋ	nukaɫpegaq	nukaɫpiaq	nukaɫpiaq	nugatpiaq	nugatpiaq	nukatpiaq	nukatpiaq	nukatpiaq	nukatpiraq	nukatpiaq	nukatpiaq	nukatpiaq	nukappiaq	nukappiaq	nukappiaq	nukappiaq	nukappiak	nukappiaq	nukapperaq	nugappiaq
daughter		*paniɣ	panex	panik	panik	panik	panik	panik	panik	panik	panik	panik	panik	panik	panik	panik	panik	panik	panik	panik	panik	panik	panik
family, relative	ilaanux̂	*ila	ila	ila	ila	ila	ila	ila	ila	ila	ila	ila	ila	ila	ila	ila	ila	ila	ila	ila	ila	ila	ila
girl	ayaĝaadax̂	*nǝvi(a)ʁc(ǝɣ)a-	náẋserráẋ	neveghsaq		neviarcaq	niaqsaaʁruk	niaqsiaʁruk	niviaqsiaʁruk	niviaqsiaʁruk	niviakkaq	niviaqsiraq	niviaqhiaq	niviaqhiaq	niviakkiaq	niviaqsiaq	niviaqsaaq	niviaqsiaq	niviatsiaq	niviatsiak	niviarhiaq	niviarsiaraq	niiarsiaq
(grand)father	adax̂/taatax̂	*ata *ata-ata	ata	ata	ata	aata	ata/ava	ata/ava	aapa/taata	aapa	aapa/ata	aappak/ataatak	aappak	ataata	ataata	ataata	ataata	ataata	ataata	ataata	ataata	ataataq	alaala
human being (shaman word's)	taĝu	taʁu	tarex	taghu	taru	taru	tau	tau	tau	tau	tau	tau	tau	tau	tau	tau	tau	tau	tau	tau	tau	taa	taa
husband	ugi	*uɣi	uga	ugwik	wik	wii	ui	ui	ui	ui	ui	ui	ui	ui	ui	ui	ui	ui	ui	uik	ui	ui	uviq
man	tayaĝux̂	*aŋu-nt	angeta	angun	angun	angun	angun	angun	angun	angun	angun	angun	angun	angut	angut	angut	anguti	anguti	anguti	angutik	angut	angut	tikkaq
mother	anax̂	*ana *ana-ana	nana	naa/ana	aana	aana	aaga	aaga	aaka	aaka	aaka	amaamak/aana	amaamak/anaana	anaana	anaana	anaana	anaana	anaana	anaana	anaana	anaana	anaanaq	annivik
mother-in-law		*caki	saka	saki	caki	cakiq	sagi	chagi	saki	saki	hakigaq	saki	haki	haki	hakigaq	saki	saki	saki	saki	sakik	haki	saki	saqiq/sagiq
older brother (of female)	huyux̂	*aNǝ-LГun	anta	aningak	anngaq	anngaq	ani	ani	ani	ani	ani	aniraaluk	ani	ani	ani	ani	ani	ani	ani	anik	ani	ani	ani
older sister (of male)	uhngix	*aleqa	nuskit	alqaq	aɫqaq	aliraq	aliqaq	aliqaq	aliqaq	aliqaq	aliqaq	aliqaq	aliqaq	aliqaq	aliqaq	aliqaq	aliqannaq	angajuk	angajuk	angajuk	aliqa	aleqaq	alara
person	anĝaĝinax̂	*inguɣ	jux	yuk	suk	yuk/cuk	inuk	inuk	iñuk	iñuk	iñuk	inuk	inuk	inuk	inuk	inuk	inuk	inuk	inuk	inuk	inuk	inuk	iik
son		*iʁni-ʁ	irnex	ighneq	irneq	irneq	irniq	irniq	irñiq	irñiq	irñiq	irniq	irniq	irniq	irniq	irniq	irniq	irniq	irniq	innik	irniq	erneq	irniq
wife	ayagax̂	*nuLiaq	nucix	nuliiq	nuliq	nuliaq	nuliaq	nuliaq	nuliaq	nuliaq	nuliaq	nuliaq	nuliaq	nuliaq	nuliaq	nuliaq	nuliaq	nuliaq	nuliaq	nuliak	nuliaq	nuliaq	nuliaq
woman	ayaĝax̂	*aʁnaq	arnax	arnaq	arnaq	arnaq	arnaq	arnaq	arnaq	arnaq	arnaq	arnaq	arnaq	arnaq	arnaq	arnaq	arnaq	arnaq	arnaq	annak	arnaq	arnaq	nuliakkaaq
young brother (of female)	kingii	*nukaq	ungjex	uyughaq	uyuwaq	uyuraq	nukaq	nukaq	nukaaluk	nukaaluk	nukaq	nukaq	nukaq	nukaq	mukaq	nukaq	nukaq	nukaq	nukaq	nukak	nukaq	nukaq	nukaq
young sister (of male)	uhngix	*nayak	najex	nayak	nayak	nayak	nayak	nayak	nayak	nayak	nayak	nayak	nayak	nayak	nayak	najak	najak	najak	najak	najaatsuk	najak	najak	najak

Pronouns

There are two types of pronouns: independent pronouns and pronominal pronouns.

Pronouns in relation to nouns

In Eskaleut languages, singular, dual, and plural nouns are marked by inflectional suffixes, and if they are possessed, the number marker is followed by pronominal suffixes that specify the (human) possessor. There are no genders, and this can be seen in the four persons: my, your, his/her, his/her own.

"His/her own" specifies ownership, in contrast with "his/her", which does not. E.g., his house vs. his own house. (See Possessive determiner § Semantics.)

Pronouns in relation to verbs

Aleut uses independent pronouns, instead of pronominal marking on verbs. On the other hand, Eskimoan languages have four persons and three numbers marked by pronominal suffixes.

Independent pronouns

Common meaning	Aleut	Proto-Eskimoan	Sirenik	Siberian Yupik	Alutiiq	Yup'ik	Seward Inupiaq	Qawiaraq	Malimiutun	North Slope	Uummarmiutun	Siglitun	Inuinnaqtun	Natsilik	Kivalliq	Aivilik	North Baffin	South Baffin	Nunavik	Labrador Inuttut	North Greenlandic	West Greenlandic	East Greenlandic
first-person singular (I)	ting	*vi	menga	hwanga	w'iinga	w'iinga	wanga	uanga	uvanga	uvanga	uvanga	uvanga	uvanga	uvanga	uvanga	uvanga	uvanga	uvanga	uvaqa	uvak	uanga	uanga	uara
second-person singular (you)	txin	*ǝɫ-vǝn-t	ɫpi	ɫpet	eɫpet	eɫpet	ivlin	ilvin	ilvich	ilvich	ilvik	ilvit	ilvit	ivrit/itvin	igvin/idvin	igvit	ivvit	ivvit	ivvit	iffit	illit	illit	ittit
third-person singular (he, she, it)	ilaa/uda	*ǝɫ-ŋa *una	langa/una	lnga/una	elen/una	elii/una	ilaa/una	ilaa/una	ilaa/una	ilaa/una	ilaa/una	ilaa/una	una	una	una	una	una	una	una	una	una	una	una
first-person dual (we both)	tingix	*vik		hwagakuk	w'iingakuk	w'iingakuk	waguk	uaguk	uvaguk	uvaguk	uvaguk	uvaguk	uvaguk	uvaguk	uvaguk	uvaguk	uvaguk	uvaguk	uvaguk	uvaguk			
second-person dual (you both)	txidix	*ǝɫ-ptek		ɫpetek	eɫpetek	eɫpetek	iliptik	iliptik	iliptik	iliptik	iliptik	iliptik	iliptik	iliptik	iliptik	iliptik	ilissik	ilittik	ilittik	ilittik			
first-person plural (we)	tingin(s)	*vit	mengaketa	hwagakuta	w'iingakuta	w'iingakuta	wagut	uagut	uvagut	uvagut	uvagut	uvagut	uvagut	uvagut	uvagut	uvagut	uvagut	uvagut	uvagut	uvagut	uagut	uagut	uangit
second-person dual reflexive (both ... yourselves)	txichix	*ǝɫ-vcet	ɫpisi	ɫpesi	eɫpici	eɫpeci	ilipsi	ilipsi	ilivsi	ilivsi	iliffi	ilipsi	iliffi	iliphi	iliphi	ilipsi	ilissi	ilitsi	ilitsi	ilitsi	ilissi	ilissi	ilitsi
third-person dual reflexive (both ... themselves)	ilaan(s)/udan(s)	*ǝɫ-ŋat *ukuat	langwi/uket	lngit/ukut	elita/ukut	eliita/ukut	ilaat/ugua	ilaat/ugua	ilaat/ukua	ilaat/ukua	ilaat/ukua	ilaat/ukua	ukua/ukkua	ukua/ukkua	ukua/ukkua	ukua/ukkua	ukua/ukkua	ukua/ukkua	ukua/ukkua	ukua/ukkua	ukua/ukkua	ukua/ukkua	ugua/ukkua

Pronominal suffixes

Common meaning	Aleut	Proto-Eskimoan	Sirenik	Siberian Yupik	Alutiiq	Yup'ik	Seward Inupiaq	Qawiaraq	Malimiutun	North Slope	Uummarmiutun	Siglitun	Inuinnaqtun	Natsilik	Kivalliq	Aivilik	North Baffin	South Baffin	Nunavik	Labrador Inuttut	North Greenlandic	West Greenlandic	East Greenlandic
first-person singular (I)	-kuq	*tua *kuq	-jua	-tua	-tua	-tua, -runga	-runga	-runga	-runga	-runga	-yunga, -yuami	-yunga	-yunga	-runga	-yunga	-junga	-junga	-junga	-junga	-junga	-junga	-punga, sunga	-pua, lua
second-person singular (you)	-kuxt	*it	-jet	-ten	-ten	-ten	-rutin	-rutin	-rutin	-rutin	-rutin	-yutin	-yutin	-rutit	-yutit	-jutit	-jutit	-jutit	-jutit	-jutit	-hutit	-sutit	-sulit
third-person singular (he, she, it)	-kux	*tuq	-jix	-tuq	-tuq	-tuq	-ruq	-ruq	-ruq	-ruq	-ruq	-yuaq	-yuq	-ruq	-yuq	-yuq	-juq	-juq	-juq	-juk	-huq	-soq, poq	-tuq, puq
first-person singular possessive (my)	-ng	*nga	-ka/qa	-ka/qa	-ka/qa	-ka/qa	-ga/ra	-ga/ra	-ga/ra	-ga/ra	-ga/ra	-ga/ra	-ga/ra	-ga/ra	-ga/ra	-ga/ra	-ga/ra	-ga/ra	-ga/ra	-ga	-ga/ra	-ga/ra	-nga/ra
second-person singular possessive (your)	-n	*in	-n	-n	-n	-n	-n	-n	-n	-n	-n	-n	-t	-t	-t	-t	-it	-it	-it	-it	-t	-t	-t
third-person singular possessive (his, her, its)	-(n)gan	*ngan	-nga/a	-nga/a	-nga/a	-nga/a	-nga/a	-nga/a	-nga/a	-nga/a	-nga/a	-nga/a	-nga/a	-nga/a	-nga/a	-nga/a	-nga/a	-nga/a	-nga/a	-nga/a	-nga/a	-nga/a	-nga/a
third-person singular object (him, her, it)	-kuu/qaa	*jaa/kaa	-jaa/kaa	-taa/kaa	-taa/kaa	-taa/kaa	-raa/gaa	-raa/gaa	-raa/gaa	-raa/gaa	-yaa/gaa	-yaa/gaa	-raa/gaa	-yaa/gaa	-jaa/gaa	-jaa/gaa	-jaa/gaa	-jaa/gaa	-jaa/gaa	-jaa/gaa	-jaa/gaa	-saa/gaa	-laa/ngaa

Interrogative words

Common meaning	Aleut	Proto-Eskimoan	Sirenik	Siberian Yupik	Alutiiq	Yup'ik	Seward Inupiaq	Qawiaraq	Malimiutun	North Slope	Uummarmiutun	Siglitun	Inuinnaqtun	Natsilik	Kivalliq	Aivilik	North Baffin	South Baffin	Nunavik	Labrador Inuttut	North Greenlandic	West Greenlandic	East Greenlandic
who	kiin	*kina	kiin	kina	kina	kina	kina	kina	kina	kina	kina	kina	kina	kina	kina	kina	kina	kina	kina	kina	kina	kina	kia
what	alqux	*caŋu	sangǝ̄́ca	sangwa/suna	cacaq	cacaq/tcauna	suna	sua	sua	suna/suva	huna	suna	huna	huna	huna	suna	kisu	suna	suna	suna	kihu	suna/sua	kisik
when (past/future)	qanaayam	*qanga/qaku	qanga/qaku	qavnga/kaku	qangwaq/qaku	qangvaq/qaku	qanga/qagun	qanga/qagu	qaglaan/qaku	qanga/qaku	qanga/qaku	qanga/qakugu	qanga/qakugu	qanga/qakugu	qanga/qakugu	qanga/qakugu	qanga/qakugu	qanga/qakugu	qanga/qakugu	kanga/kakugu	qanga/qakugu	qanga/qaqugu	qanga/qara
where	qaataa	*nani	nani	nani/naa/sami	nama/nani	nani/cami	naung/nani	naunga/nani	sumi/nani/naung	sumi/nani/naung	humi/nani/nau	sumi/nani/naung	humi/nani/naung	humi/naung	nani/naung	sumi/nauk	nani/nauk	nami/nani	nami/nani	nami/nani	humi	sumi	sumi
why	alqul(-usaal)	*caŋu	sangaami	sangami	cin/caluni	ciin/caluni	suami	suami	summan/suvataa	summan/suvataa	huuq	suuq	huuq	huuq	huuq	suuq	suuq	sungmat	sumut	summat	huuq	sooq	suuq

Body parts

Common meaning	Aleut	Proto-Eskimoan	Sirenik	Siberian Yupik	Alutiiq	Yup'ik	Seward Inupiaq	Qawiaraq	Malimiutun	North Slope	Uummarmiutun	Siglitun	Inuinnaqtun	Natsilik	Kivalliq	Aivilik	North Baffin	South Baffin	Nunavik	Labrador Inuttut	North Greenlandic	West Greenlandic	East Greenlandic
anus	idiĝasix̂	*ǝtǝʁ	tex	eteq	eteq	teq	itiq	itiq	itiq	itiq	itiq	itiq	itiq	itiq	itiq	itiq	itiq	itiq	itiq	itik	itiq	iteq	iliq? *kiaavik
arm	chuyux̂	*taɫi-	jaqex	taɫiq	taɫiq	taɫiq	taliq	taliq	taliq	taliq	taliq	taliq	taliq	taliq	taliq	taliq	taliq	taliq	taliq	talik	taliq	taleq	taliq
belly	xax	*aqja	aqii	aqyaq	aqsaq	aqsaq	aqiaq	aqiaq	aqiaq	aqiaq	aqiaq	aqiaq	aqiaq	aqiaq	aqiaq	aqiaq	aqiaq	aqiaq	aqiaq	akiak	aqiaq	aqajaq	ariaq
blood	aamaaxs	*aruɣ	acex/arux	awk	auk	auk	awk	auk	auk	auk	auk	auk	auk	auk	auk	auk	auk	auk	auk	auk	auk	aak	aak
calf	tugaadix̂	*nakacuɣ-na-	nakasegnax	nakasugnaq	nakacugnaq	nakacugnaq	nakasungnaq	nakasungnaq	nakasrungnaq	nakasungnaq	nakahungnaq	nakasungnaq	nakahungnaq	nakahungnaq	nakahungnaq	nakasungnaq	nakasungnaq	nakasunnaq	nakasunnaq	nakasunnak	nakahungnaq	nakasunnaaq	
ear	tutusix̂	*ciɣunt	siigeta	sigun	cuun	ciun	siun	siun	siun	siun	hiun	siun	hiun	hiut	hiut	siut	siuti	siuti	siuti	siutik	hiut	siut	siit/*tusaat
eye	dax̂	*irǝ	eca	iya	ii/iingaq	ii/iingaq	izi	izi	iri	iri	iyi	iyi	iyi	iri	iyi	iji	iji	iji	iji	ijik	ihi	isi	ili
eyelash	dam qaxsaa	*qǝmǝʁja-	qemerjax/seqpix	qemeryaq/siqpik	qemeryaq/ciqpik	qemeryaq/ciqpek	qimiriaq/siqpiq	qimiriaq/siqpik	qimiriaq/siqpik	qimiriaq/siqpik	qimiriaq/hiqpik	qimiriaq/siqpik	qimiriaq/hiqpik	qimiriaq/hiqpik	qimiriaq/hiqpik	qimiriaq/siqpik	qimiriaq/siqpik	qimiriaq/siqpik	qimiriaq/siqpik	kimigiak/sippik	qimiriaq/hiqpik	qimeriaq/serpik	qimiiaq/sirpik
finger	atx̂ux̂	*ińura-	nurax	yughaq	suaraq	yuaraq	inugaq	inugaq	iñugaq	iñugaq	iñugaq	inugaq	inugaq	inugaq	inugaq	inugaq	inugaq	inugaq	inugaq	inugak	inugaq	inuaq	iiaq
fingernail		*kikra		kiikiak			kigiak	kikiak	kikiak	kikiak	kikiak	kikiak	kikiak	kikiak	kikiak	kikiak	kikiak	kikiak	kikiak	kikiak	kikiak	kikiak	kigiak
foot	kitax̂	*itǝɣ-(a-)	ítegá	itegaq	itaq	itgaq	itigak	itigaq	isigak	isigak	ihigak	itigak	itigak	ihigak	itigak	itigak	isigak	itigak	itigak	itigak	ihigak	isigak	
hair	iimlix	*ńujaq	nujǝẋ/jujǝẋ	nuyaq	nuyaq	nuyaq	nuyaq	nuyaq	nuyaq	nuyaq	nuyaq	nuyaq	nuyaq	nuyaq	nuyaq	nujaq	nujaq	nujaq	nujaq	nujak	nujaq	nujaq	nujaq
hand	chax̂	*arɣa	ácxeẋ	aykaq	aikaq	aikaq	agrak	agraq	argak	argak	argak	adjgak *aygak	algak	argak	adjgak	aggak	aggak	aggak	aggak	aggak	aghak	assak	attak
head	kamĝix̂	*ńarǝ-qu-	iiceqeẋ	naasquq/nayquq	nasquq	nacquq	niaquq	niaquq	niaquq	niaquq	niaquq	niaquq	niaquq	niaquq	niaquq	niaquq	niaquq	niaquq	niaquq	niakuk	niaquq	niaqoq	suuniq
heart	kanuux̂	*uŋ-uma-	ungevata	unguvan	unguwan	unguvan	uumman	uumman	uumman	uumman	uumman	uumman	uumman	uummat	uummat	uummat	uummati	uummati	uummati	uummatik	uummat	uummat	iimmat
knee	chidiĝix	*ciɣǝr-qu	sigesqeẋ	serquq	cisquq	ciisquq	siitquq	siitquq	siitquq	siitquq	hiitquq	siitquq	hiitquq	hiitquq	hiitquq	siiqquq	siiqquq	siiqquq	siirquq	siikkuk	hiiqquq	seeqqoq	
navel	qiihliqdax̂	*qacaɫǝʁ	qaɫasex	qasaɫeq	qaɫaciq	qaɫaciq	qalaziq	qalachiq	qalasriq	qalasiq	qalahiq	qalasiq	qalahiq	qalahiq	qalahiq	qalasiq	qalasiq	qalasiq	qalasiq	kalasik	qalahiq	qalaseq	
nose	angusix̂	*qǝŋa-	qengax	qengaq	qengaq	qengaq	qingaq	qingaq	qingaq	qingaq	qingaq	qingaq	qingaq	qingaq	qingaq	qingaq	qingaq	qingaq	qingaq	kingak	qingaq	qingaq	qingaq

Animals

Common meaning	Aleut	Proto-Eskimoan	Sirenik	Siberian Yupik	Alutiiq	Yup'ik	Seward Inupiaq	Qawiaraq	Malimiutun	North Slope	Uummarmiutun	Siglitun	Inuinnaqtun	Natsilik	Kivalliq	Aivilik	North Baffin	South Baffin	Nunavik	Labrador Inuttut	North Greenlandic	West Greenlandic	East Greenlandic
bowhead whale, whale	alax̂	*aʁvǝʁ	arvex	arveq	arweq/arruq	arveq	arviq	arviq	arviq	arviq	arviq	arviq	arviq	arviq	arviq	arviq	arviq	arviq	arviq	avvik	arviq	arfeq	arpiq
Canada goose	laĝix̂	*lǝqlǝʁ	leẋɫeẋ	leghɫeq	neqɫeq	neqɫeq	lirliq	lirliq	lirliq	nirliq	nirliq	nirliq	nirliq	nirliq	nirliq	lirliq/nirliq	nirliq	nirliq	nirliq	nillik	nirliq	nerleq	nirtiq
caribou	itx̂aygix̂	*tuŋtu	tumta	tungtu	tuntu	tuntu	tuttu	tuttu	tuttu	tuttu	tuttu	tuktu	tuktu	tuktu	tuktu	tuktu	tuktu	tuttu	tuttu	tuttuk	tuktu	tuttu	tuttuq
dog	sabaakax̂	*qikmi-	qepeneẋ	qikmiq	qiqmiq/piugta	qimugta	qimmiq	qimmiq	qipmiq	qimmiq	qimmiq	qimmiq	qinmiq	qingmiq/qimmiq	qingmiq/qimmiq	qimmiq	qimmiq	qimmiq	qimmiq	kimmik	qimmiq	qimmeq	qimmiq
fish	qax̂	*ǝqaɫuɣ	iqeɫex	iqaɫuk	iqaɫuk	iqaɫuk	iraluk	iraluk	iqaluk	iqaluk	qaluk	iqaluk	iqaluk	iqaluk	iqaluk	iqaluk	iqaluk	iqaluk	iqaluk	ikaluk	iqaluk	eqaluk	iqalik
groundhog, Arctic squirrel	sixsix	*sigsik	siksix	sikik	cikik	cikik	siksrik	chiksrik	siksrik	siksrik	siksrik	siksik	hikhik	hiksik	hikhik	siksik	siksi	sitsik	sitsik	sitsik	highik	sissi	sitsiq
killer whale	aglux̂	*aʁɫuɣ	arɫux?	arɫuk	aqɫuk	arɫuk	aarlu	aarlu	aarlu	aarlu	aarlu	aarlu	aarlu	aarluk	aarluk	aarluk	aarluk	aarluk	aarluk	aalluk	aarluk	aarluk	aartiq?
louse	kitux̂	*kumaɣ	kúmex	kumak	kumak	kumak	kumak	kumak	kumak	kumak	kumak	kumak	kumak	kumak	kumak	kumak	kumak	kumak	kumak	kumak	kumak	kumak	kumak
oldsquaw/long-tailed duck	aagix̂	*aXaŋǝ-liʁ	aahaangalex	aahaangwliq	ahangkiluk	aahaangiiq/aahaaliq	aa'aangiq	aa'aangiq	aahaaliq	aahaaliq	ahaangiq	ahaangiq	aahaalliq	ahaangiq	ahaangiq	ahaangiq	ahaangiq	ahaangiq	ahaangiq	ahaangik	ahaangiq	ahaangiq	ahaangiq
ptarmigan	aĝdiikax̂	*aqărɣiʁ	aqergex	aqargiiq/aqarriq	aqasgiiq	aqazgiiq	arargiq	arargiq	aqargiq	aqargiq	aqaygiq	aqiygiq	aqilgiq	aqirgiq/aqigriq	aqidjgiq	aqiggiq	aqiggiq	aqiggiq	aqiggiq	akiggik	aqighiq	aqisseq	nagalaraq
swan	qukingix̂	*quɣruɣ	qerúmɫeráẋ	quuk	qugyuq	qugyuq	qugruk	qugruk	qugruk	qugruk	qugruk	qugyuk	qugyuk	qugyuk	qugyuk	qugjuk	qugjuk	qujjuk	qujjuk	kutjuk	qughuk	qussuk	qutsuk

Other nouns

Common meaning	Aleut	Proto-Eskimoan	Sirenik	Siberian Yupik	Alutiiq	Yup'ik	Seward Inupiaq	Qawiaraq	Malimiutun	North Slope	Uummarmiutun	Siglitun	Inuinnaqtun	Natsilik	Kivalliq	Aivilik	North Baffin	South Baffin	Nunavik	Labrador Inuttut	North Greenlandic	West Greenlandic	East Greenlandic
and, also	ama	*amma	ama/sama	amahwa/aamta	amleq/cama	amleq/cama	amma	amma	amma	amma	amma	amma	amma	amma	amma	amma	amma	amma	amma	amma	amma	aamma	aamma
arrow		*qaʁru	qarceẋ	ruuq	ruuq	qeruq	qarruq	qarruq	qarruq	qarruq	qarruq	qaryuq	qaryuq	qaryuq	qaryuq	qarjuq	qarjuq	qarjuk	qajjuk	katjuk	qarhuq	qarsoq	qarliq
ash	utxix̂	*aʁra	arex	aʁra	araq	araq	arra	arra	arra	arra	arra	arya	arya	arya	arya	arja	arja	arja	ajja	atjak	arhaq	arsaq	arlaq
atmosphere, weather, out	silan/slax̂	*cǝla	siɫa	sɫaa	ɫa	ciɫa/ella	sila	chila	sila	sila	hila	sila	hila	hila	hila	sila	sila	sila	sila	sila	hila	sila	sila
breath	angil	*anǝʁ-	anerte-	anernaq	anerneq	anerneq	anirniq	anirniq	aniqniq	anirniq	anirniq	anirniq	anirniq	anirniq	anirniq	anirniq	anirniq	anirniq	anirniq	aninnik	anirniq	anerneq	anirniq
cloud		*nụvǝja					nuiya	nuwiya	nuviya	nuviya	nuvuya	nuvuya	nuvuya	nuvuya	nuvuya	nuvuja	nuvujaq	nuvujaq	nuvujaq	nuvujak	nuvujaq	nuiaq	nuviaq
cook	unagix̂	*ǝɣa	ega	ega	ega	ega	iga	iga	iga	iga	iga	iga	iga	iga	iga	iga	iga	iga	iga	iga	iga	iga	inga
cry, weep	qidal	*qiRă-	qeje	qeya	qia	qeya	qia	qia	qia	qia	qia	qia	qia	qia	qia	qia	qia	qia	qia	kia	qia	qia	qia
dog barking	qihlux	*qiluɣ	qelux	qilugaq	qiluk	qiluk	qiluk	qiluk	qiluk	qiluk	qiluk	qiluk	qiluk	qiluk	qiluk	qiluk	qiluk	qiluk	qiluk	kiluk	qiluk	qiluk	qiliilaq
earth	tanax̂	*luna		nuna	nuna	nuna	nuna	nuna	nuna	nuna	nuna	nuna	nuna	nuna	nuna	nuna	nuna	nuna	nuna	nuna	nuna	nuna	nuna
feather	haka	*culuk	silek	siluk	culuk	culuk	suluk	chuluk	suluk	suluk	huluk	suluk	huluk	huluk	huluk	suluk	suluk	suluk	suluk	suluk	huluk	suluk	siik
fire	qignal	*ǝknǝ-	ekn'ex	ekneq	keneq	keneq	ikniq	itniq	ikniq	igniq	ingniq	ingniq	ingniq	ingniq	ingniq	ingniq	ingniq	inniq	inniq	innik	ingniq	inneq	igivattattiq
Here it is!	wa	*uva	hwa	hwa	w'a	w'a	uvvaa	uvvaa	uvva	uvva	uvva	uvva	uvva	uvva	uvva	uvva	uvva	uvva	uvva	uvva	uhha	uffa	uppa
hilltop	qayax̂	*qemi	qemix	qemiq	qemiq	qemiq	qimiq	qimiq	qimiq	qimiq	qimiq	qimiq	qimiq	qimiq	qimiq	qimiq	qimiq	qimiq	qimiq	kimik	qimiq	qimeq	qimiq
house	ulax̂	*ǝŋlu	lu	inglu	englu	englu	iglu	iglu	iglu	iglu	iglu	iglu	iglu	iglu	iglu	iglu	iglu	illu	illu	illuk	iglu	illu	ittiq
hungry	haagil	*kajak	kajex	keek	kaik	kaik	kaak	kaak	kaak	kaak	kaak	kaak	kaak	kaak	kaak	kaak	kaak	kaak	kaak	kaak	kaak	kaak	kaak
kiss, kiss on nose	qingul	*kungik	singeq	singaq(-ghaqaa)	cingaq	cingaq	kunik	kunik	kunik	kunik	kunik	kunik	kunik	kunik	kunik	kunik	kunik	kunik	kunik	kunik	kunik	kunik	kunik
lake	hanix̂	*taci-ʁ	jajvex	nayvaq	nanwaq	nanvaq	navraq/teziq	navraq/tachiq	narvaq/tasriq	narvaq/tasiq	narvaq/tahiq	nayvaq/tasiq	nalvaq/tahiq	narvaq/tahiq	nagvaq/tahiq	navvaq/tasiq	navvaq/tasiq	navvaq/tasiq	navvaq/tasiq	navvak/tasik	nassak/tahiq	nassak/taseq	nattak/tasiq
load	husix̂	*uci	usa	usi	uci	uci	uzi	uchi	usri	usi	uhi	usi	uhi	uhi	uhi	usi	usi	usi	usi	usik	uhi	usi	usi
milk	mulukax	*emug, itug	ituk/emunge	ituk/emuk	muk	ituk	immuk	immuk	immuk	immuk	ituk	miluk	miluk	ituk	immuk	immuk	immuk	immuk	immuk	immuk	immuk	immuk	immuk
name	asax̂	*atǝʁ	atex	ateq	ateq	ateq	atiq	atiq	atiq	atiq	atiq	atiq	atiq	atiq	atiq	atiq	atiq	atiq	atiq	atik	atiq	ateq	aliq
no	nangaa	*naaka *qaanga	naaka	naka/naah	kaa	ina/qanga	naami/naagga	qanngaq/naagga	naumi/naakka	naumi/naagga	naggai	naaggai	imannaq	iiq/naagga	naung/naagga	nauk/aakka	aakka/naagga	aukka/aggaq	naggai/nauk	aukang	na'a/naagga	naami/naagga	iiqqii
price, value	akiisal	*aki	aka	aki	aki	aki	aki	aki	agi	agi	aki	aki	aki	aki	aki	aki	aki	aki	aki	aki	akik	aki	agiq
shaman	qugaaĝix̂	*aŋalku-	angekex	angaɫkuq	angaɫquq	angaɫkuq	angatkuq	angatkuq	angatkuq	angatkuq	angatkuq	angatkuq	angatkuq	angatkuq	angatkuq	angakkuq	angakkuq	angakkuq	angakkuq	angakkuk	angakkuq	angakkoq	angakkiq
ship, boat	ayxaasix̂	*umi(r)a	umax	umiaq	umiaq	umiaq	umiaq	umiaq	umiaq	umiaq	umiaq	umiaq	umiaq	umiaq	umiaq	umiaq	umiaq	umiaq	umiaq	umiak	umiaq	umiaq	umiaq
sky	inix̂	*qilaɣ	qilex	qilak	qilak	qilak	qilak	qilak	qilak	qilak	qilak	qilak	qilak	qilak	qilak	qilak	qilak	qilak	qilak	kilak	qilak	qilak	qilak
smoke	huyux̂s	*puju	pujex	puyuq	puyuq	puyuq	puyuq	puyuq	puyuq	puyuq	puyuq	puyuq	puyuq	puyuq	puyuq	pujuq	pujuq	pujuq	pujuq	pujuk	pujuq	pujoq	pujuq
snow(flake)	qaniigix̂	*qaniɣ	qanix	qanik	qanik	qaniq	qanik	qanik	qanik	qanik	qanik	qanik	qanik	qanik	qanik	qanik	qanik	qanik	qanik	kanik	qanik	qanik	qanik
star	sdax̂	*umluria					uvluriaq	uvluriaq	uvluriaq	uvluriaq	uvluriaq	ubluriaq	ubluriaq	ubluriaq	ubluriaq	ubluriaq	ulluriaq	ulluriaq	ulluriaq	ullugiak	ulluriaq	ulloriaq	utturiaq
sun, day	aĝadĝix̂	*ciqi-nǝʁ	siqinex	siqineq/mazaq	ciqineq/masaq	ciqineq/macaq	siriniq/mazaq	chiqiniq/machaq	siqiñiq/masaq	siqiñiq	hiqiñiq	siqiniq	hiqiniq	hiqiniq	hiqiniq	siqiniq	siqiniq	siqiniq	siqiniq	sikinik	hiqiniq	seqineq	siirliq
tell a story/legend	uniikal	*uniɣ-paʁ-	unircex	ungikpaq	unifkuaq	unifkaraq	unipkaaq	unipkaaq	unipkaaq	unipkaaq	unipkaaq	unipkaaq	unipkaaq	unipkaaq	unipkaaq	unipkaaq	unikkaaq	unikkaaq	unikkaaq	unikkaak	unikkaaq	unikkaaq	unikkaaq
tent	pulaatxix̂	*tupǝʁ	tupex	tupeq			tuviq	tuviq	tupiq	tupiq	tupiq	tupiq	tupiq	tupiq	tupiq	tupiq	tupiq	tupiq	tupiq	tupik	tupiq	tupeq	tupiq
to ask	ahmat-	*apete	apet-	apetaqa-	apqar-	apete-	apiri-	apiri-	apiri-	apiri-	apiri-	apiri-	apiri-	apiri-	apiri-	apiri-	apiri-	apiri-	apiri-	apigi-	apiri-	aperi-	apii-
to urinate	qaalux̂	*quʁ(r)ǝ-	qux-teqex	uraquq	qure-	qure-	qui-	qui-	qui-	qui-	qui-	qui-	qui-	qui-	qui-	qui-	qui-	qui-	qui-	kui-	qui-	qui-	quvi-
tree, wood		*napar-	napax	napartuq	napaq	napa	napaaqtuq	napaaqtuq	napaaqtuq	napaaqtuq	napaaqtuq	napaaqtuq	napaaqtuq	napaaqtuq	napaaqtuq	napaaqtuq	napaaqtuq	napaaqtiq	napaattuq	napaattuk	uqpik/napaaqtuq	orpik/napaartoq	urpik/napaartuq
water	taangax̂	*ǝmǝʁ	mex	emeq	meq	imiq	imiq	imiq	imiq	imiq	imiq	imiq	imiq	imiq	imiq	imiq	imiq	imiq	imiq	imik	imiq	imeq	imiq
wind	achunal	*anuqǝ	anuqa	anuqa	anuqa	anuqa	anuri	anuri	anuri	anuri	anuri	anuri	anuri	anuri	anuri	anuri	anuri	anuri	anuri	anugik	anuri	anori	anirsiq
yes	aang	*aa/ii	ii	ii	ii-i	ii-i	ii-i	ii-i	ii	ii	ii	ii	ii	ii	ii	ii	ii	ii	ii	ii	ii	aap	ii

Adjectives

Common meaning	Aleut	Proto-Eskimoan	Sirenik	Siberian Yupik	Alutiiq	Yup'ik	Seward Inupiaq	Qawiaraq	Malimiutun	North Slope	Uummarmiutun	Siglitun	Inuinnaqtun	Natsilik	Kivalliq	Aivilik	North Baffin	South Baffin	Nunavik	Labrador Inuttut	North Greenlandic	West Greenlandic	East Greenlandic
Cold!/Brrr!/How cold!	ababa	*alaapaa					alaapa	alaappa	alaappa	alaappa	alaappa	alaappa	alaappa	alaappa	ikkii	ikkii	ikkii	ikkii	ikkii	ikkii	ikkii	ikkii	ikkii
copper	kanuuyax̂	*kanɣu-ja	kanuje	kanuya	kanuyaq	kanuyaq	kannuuyaq	kannuyaq	kannuyaq	kannguyaq	kannuyaq	kannuyaq	kannuyaq	kannuyaq	kanuhaq	kannujaq	kannujaq	kannujaq	kanusaq	kannujak	kannussaq	kanngussak	kanngutsak
fat	ignatul	*quvi	quginaẋ	quginaq	quili	quvinaq	quiniq	quiniq	quiniq	quiniq	quiniq	quiniq	quiniq	quiniq	quiniq	quiniq	quiniq	quiniq	quiniq	kuinik	quiniq	quineq	quiniq
grey hair	qidaayux	*qirʁǝʁ	qircéreɫeẋ	qiiq	qiiq	qiiq	qiʁriq	qirʁiq	qirʁiq	qirʁi	qirʁiq	qiyriq	qiiq	qiriq	qiiq	qiiq	qiiq	qiiq	qiiq	kiik	qiiq	qeeq	qiiq
long	adul	*takǝ(v)	takevaláẋ	taakǝlʁi	takequq	takequq	tagiruq	tagiruq	takiruq	takiruq	takiruq	takiyuq	takiyuq	takiyuq	takiyuq	takijuq	takijuq	takijuq	takijuq	takijuk	takihuuq	takisooq/takivoq	tagiliq
still, also, more	ahlii	*culi	sali	salin	cali	cali	suli	chuli	suli	suli	huli	suli	huli	huli	huli	suli	suli	suli	suli	suli	huli	suli	suli
swell	hums	*puvet	puvceqertéẋ	puuvaaquq	puge-	puve-	puit-	puit-	puvit-	puvit-	puvit-	puvit-	puvit-	puvit-	puvit-	puvit-	puvit-	puvit-	puvit-	puvit-	puvit-	puik-	puiq-
white	quhmax̂	*qătǝ-ʁ	qetex	qeteq	qeteq	qeter-	qatiq	qatiq	qatiq	qatiq	qatiq	qatiq	qakuqtaq	qaquqtaq	qakuqtaq	qakuqtaq	qakuqtaq	qakuqtaq	qakutaq	kakuttak	qakuqtuq	qaqortoq	qaartiq

Numbers

Common meaning	Aleut	Proto-Eskimoan	Sirenik	Siberian Yupik	Alutiiq	Yup'ik	Seward Inupiaq	Qawiaraq	Malimiutun	North Slope	Uummarmiutun	Siglitun	Inuinnaqtun	Natsilik	Kivalliq	Aivilik	North Baffin	South Baffin	Nunavik	Labrador Inuttut	North Greenlandic	West Greenlandic	East Greenlandic
one	ataqan	*ataʁu-ci-	ateresex	ataaziq	atauciq/atuusiq	atauciq	atausiq	atauchiq	atausriq	atausiq	atauhiq	atausiq	atauhiq	atauhiq	atauhiq	atausiq	atausiq	atausiq	atausiq	atausik	atauhiq	ataaseq	alaasiq
two	aalax̂	*malǝʁu-	malrug	malghuk	malluk	malruk	marluuk	marluk	malruk	malruk	malruk	malruk	malruuk	malruuk	malruuk	marruuk	marruuk	marruuk	maqruuk	magguuk	marluk	marluk	martut
three	qankun(-s)	*pingajunt	pingejug	pingayut	pingaun	pingayun	pingasut	pingachut	piñgasrut	piñgasut	piñgahut	pingasut	pingahut	pingahut	pingahut	pingasut	pingasut	pingasut	pingasut	pingasut	pingahut	pingasut	pingasit
four	siiching	*cǝtama-	sitamij	sitamat	staamat	cetaman	sitaman	chitaman	sisaman	sisaman	hihaman	sitaman	hitaman	hihamat	hitamat	sitamat	tisamat	sitamat	sitamat	sitamat	hihamat	sisamat	siamat
five	chaang	*taɫiman	tasímengíyi	taɫimat	taɫiman	taɫiman	tauliman	taliman	talliman	talliman	talliman	talliman	talliman	tallimat	tallimat	tallimat	tallimat	tallimat	tallimat	tallimat	tallimat	tallimat	tattimat
six	atuung	*aʁvinelegh	inglex	aghvínelek	arwinlgen	arvinglegen	arwinilik	arwinilik	itchaksrat	itchaksat	itchakhat	arvinillik	arvinillik	arviniq	arvinraq	arviniqtut	arviniliit	pingasuujuqtut	pingasuujurtut	pingasuujuttut	arviniglit	arfinillit	arpiniit
ten	hatix̂	*qulǝ(ŋ)	qulex?	qula	qulin	qula	qulit	qulit	qulit	qulit	qulit	qulit	qulit	qulit	qulit	qulit	qulit	qulit	qulit	kulit	qulit	qulit	qutit

== See also ==
- Eskimo-Uralic
- Eskimology
- Proto-Eskaleut language
- Proto-Eskimoan language
- Uralo-Siberian

== Bibliography ==
- Bergsland, Knut (1997). Aleut Grammar: Unangam Tunuganaan Achixaasix̂. Alaska Native Language Center.
- Bernet, John W. (1974). An Anthology of Aleut, Eskimo, and Indian Literature of Alaska in English Translation. Fairbanks: University of Alaska.
- Booij, Geert; Lehmann, Christian; Mugdan, Joachim; Skopeteas, Stavros, eds. (2004). Morphologie / Morphology. Vol. 2. Walter de Gruyter. doi:10.1515/9783110172782.2. ISBN 978-3-11-019427-2.
- Crowley, Terry; Bowern, Claire (2010). An Introduction to Historical Linguistics. New York: Oxford University Press.
- Dumond, Don E. (1965). "On Eskaleutian Linguistics, Archaeology, and Prehistory". American Anthropologist. 67 (5): 1231–1257. doi:10.1525/aa.1965.67.5.02a00080. JSTOR 668365.
- Fleming, Harold C. (1987). "Towards a definitive classification of the world's languages". Diachronica. 4 (1–2): 159–223. doi:10.1075/dia.4.1-2.09fle.
- Fortescue, Michael D. (1984). Some Problems Concerning the Correlation and Reconstruction of Eskimo and Aleut Mood Markers. København: Institut for Eskimologi, Københavns Universitet. ISBN 87-87874-10-5.
- Fortescue, Michael D.; Jacobson, Steven A.; Kaplan, Lawrence D. (1994). Comparative Eskimo Dictionary with Aleut Cognates. Fairbanks: Alaska Native Language Center, University of Alaska, Fairbanks. ISBN 1-55500-051-7. CE976FJK1994.
- Fortescue, Michael (1998). Language Relations across Bering Strait: Reappraising the Archaeological and Linguistic Evidence. London: Cassell. ISBN 978-0-304-70330-2.
- Greenberg, Joseph H. (2000). Indo-European and Its Closest Relatives: The Eurasiatic Language Family. Vol. 1: Grammar. Stanford, CA: Stanford University Press.
- Greenberg, Joseph H. (2002). Indo-European and Its Closest Relatives: The Eurasiatic Language Family. Vol. 2: Lexicon. Stanford, CA: Stanford University Press.
- Gutman, Alejandro; Avanzati, Beatriz (2013). "Eskimo–Aleut Languages". The Language Gulper. Archived from the original on 8 October 2023.
- Hamp, Eric P., ed. (1976). Papers on Eskimo and Aleut Linguistics. Conference on Eskimo Linguistics. Chicago: Chicago Linguistic Society.
- Holst, Jan Henrik (2005). Einführung in die eskimo-aleutischen Sprachen (in German). Hamburg: Buske. ISBN 9783875483864.
- Johns, Alana (2014). "Eskimo–Aleut". The Oxford Handbook of Derivational Morphology. doi:10.1093/oxfordhb/9780199641642.013.0037. ISBN 9780199641642.
- Marsh, Gordon H. (1956). The Linguistic Divisions of the Eskimo–Aleut Stock. CE951M1956.
- Miyaoka, Osahito (2012). A grammar of Central Alaskan Yupik (CAY). Mouton Grammar Library. Vol. 58. doi:10.1515/9783110278576. ISBN 9783110278200.
- Swift, Mary D. (2004). Time in Child Inuktitut: A Developmental Study of an Eskimo–Aleut Language. Studies on Language Acquisition. Vol. 24. Berlin: Mouton de Gruyter. ISBN 3-11-018120-7.
