= Yupik languages =

Languages of the Yupik natives of Alaska

Yupik
- Geographic distribution: Alaska, Chukotka
- Ethnicity: Yupik peoples
- Linguistic classification: Eskaleut: Eskimo; Yupik
- Subdivisions: Alutiiq; Central Alaskan; Central Siberian; Naukan; ?Sirenik †

Language codes
- ISO 639-2 / 5: ypk
- Glottolog: yupi1267

The Yupik languages (/ˈjuːpɪk/) are a family of languages spoken by the Yupik peoples of western and south-central Alaska and Chukotka. The Yupik languages differ enough from one another that they are not mutually intelligible, although speakers of one of the languages may understand the general idea of a conversation of speakers of another of the languages. One of them, Sirenik, has been extinct since 1997.

The Yupik languages are in the family of Eskaleut languages. Aleut and Eskimoan diverged around 2000 BCE; within the Eskimoan classification, the Yupik languages diverged from each other and from the Inuit languages around 1000 CE.

== List of languages ==
1. Naukan Yupik (also Naukanski): spoken by perhaps 100 people in and around Lavrentiya, Lorino, and Uelen on the Chukotka Peninsula of Eastern Siberia.
2. Central Siberian Yupik (also Yupigestun, Akuzipigestun, Akuzipik, Siberian Yupik, Siberian Yupik Eskimo, Central Siberian Yupik Eskimo, St. Lawrence Island Yupik, Yuit, Asiatic Eskimo, Jupigyt, Yupihyt, Bering Strait Yupik): spoken by the majority of Yupik in the Russian Far East and by the people on St. Lawrence Island, Alaska. Most of the 1,100 Yupiks on St. Lawrence Island still speak the St. Lawrence dialect of this language. About 200 of the 1,200 Siberian Yupiks in Russia still speak the Chaplino dialect of this language. However, The Moscow Times is much more pessimistic, claiming that in 2023 only one Central Siberian Yupik active speaker remains in Russia.
3. Central Alaskan Yup'ik (also Yugtun, Central Yup'ik, Yup'ik, West Alaska Eskimo): spoken on the Alaska mainland from Norton Sound down to the Alaska Peninsula and on some islands such as Nunivak. The name of this language is spelled Yup'ik, with an apostrophe that specifies the elongated 'p' in the way Yupik is pronounced; all the other languages are spelled Yupik, but all are pronounced the same. Of the about 21,000 Central Alaskan Yup'ik, around 20,000 still spoke this language at home in 2013. There are several dialects of Central Alaskan Yup'ik. The largest dialect, General Central Yup'ik or Yugtun, is spoken in the Yukon River, Nelson Island, Kuskokwim River, and Bristol Bay areas. There are three other Central Alaskan Yup'ik dialects: Norton Sound, Hooper Bay/Chevak, and Nunivak Island (called Cup’ik or Cup'ig). The dialects differ in pronunciation and in vocabulary. Within the General Central Yup'ik dialect there are geographic subdialects which differ mostly in word choices.
4. Alutiiq (also Alutiit’stun or Sugt'stun, Supik, Sugpiaq, Pacific Gulf Yupik, Pacific Yupik, or Chugach): is spoken from the Alaska Peninsula eastward to Prince William Sound. There are about 3,000 Alutiiqs, but only 500–1,000 people still speak this language. The Koniag dialect is spoken on the south side of the Alaska Peninsula and on Kodiak Island. The Chugach dialect is spoken on the Kenai Peninsula and in Prince William Sound.
5. Sirenik an extinct language formerly spoken on the Chukchi Peninsula. It is divergent enough for some researchers to classify it as a separate branch of the Eskimo languages.

== Phonology ==
=== Consonants ===
Central Yup'ik Consonants:

c [ts]~[tʃ], g [ɣ], gg [x], k, l [l], ll [ɬ], m, ḿ (voiceless m), n (alveolar), ń (voiceless n), ng [ŋ], ńg (voiceless ŋ), p, q [q], r [ʁ], rr [χ], s [z], ss [s], t (alveolar), û [w], v [v]~[w], vv [f], w [χʷ], y [j], (gemination of preceding consonant)

		Labial	Alveolar		Post- alveolar	Velar		Uvular	
		Labial	median	lateral	Post- alveolar	plain	labialized	plain	labialized
Nasal	voiceless	m̥	n̥			ŋ̊			
Nasal	voiced	m	n			ŋ			
Plosive		p	t			k		q	
Affricate			[ts]		tʃ				
Fricative	voiceless	f	s	ɬ		x	xʷ	χ	[χʷ]
Fricative	voiced	v	z			ɣ	ɣʷ	ʁ	ʁʷ
Approximant				l	j		[w]		

=== Vowels ===
Yupik languages have four vowels: 'a', 'i', 'u' and schwa (ə). They have from 13 to 27 consonants.

Central Yup'ik Vowels:

a, aa, e (ə) (schwa), i, ii, u, uu

(In proximity to the uvular consonants 'q', 'r' or 'rr', the vowel /i/ is pronounced [e], and /u/ is pronounced [o].)

=== Prosody ===
==== Syllable ====
Yup'ik verbs always begin with a root morpheme like "kaig" - to be hungry, and always end with a pronoun.

Yupik is a polysynthetic language that can have analytic alternatives; speakers can express similar ideas in a series of words with a number of bound morphemes.

==== Stress ====
The stress pattern of Central Siberian and Central Alaskan is generally iambic where stress occurs on the second syllable of each two-syllable metrical foot. This can be seen in words consisting of light (L) syllables. Here, the parsing of syllables into feet is represented with parentheses:

(L'L)L	qayáni	(qa.yá).ni	"his own kayak"

As can be seen above, the footing of a Yupik word starts from the left edge of the word. (Therefore, a foot parsing of L(L'L)(L'L) is not permitted.) Syllables that cannot be parsed into feet in words with an odd number of syllables are not stressed. (Thus, a parsing of (L'L)('L) is impossible.)

Additionally, heavy (H) syllables (consisting of two moras) are obligatorily stressed:

(L'H)L	qayá:ni	(qa.yá:).ni	"in another's kayak"

However, there is a restriction against stress falling on the final syllable of a phrase:

(L'L)(L'L) (phrase-internal)
(L'L)LL (phrase-final)

Stressed syllables undergo phonetic lengthening in Yupik although the details differ from dialect to dialect. Generally, a foot consisting of light CV syllables will have the stressed vowel at a greater length than the unstressed vowel. That can be analyzed as light syllables changing to heavy under stress:

(L'L)L (qayá:)ni	→	(L'H)L [qayá:ni] [(qa.yá:).ni]	"in another's kayak"
(L'L)('H)L saguyá:ni	→	(L'H)('H)L [sagú:yá:ni] [(sa.gú:).(yá:).ni]	"in another's drum"

Both Central Siberian and Central Alaskan Yup'ik show this iambic lengthening of light syllables.

When the stressed syllable is underlyingly heavy (such as LHL)), there is dialectal variation. The Chaplinski variety of Central Siberian Yupik shows no extra lengthening of the already long vowel: the heavy syllables remain heavy (no change). The St. Lawrence variety of Central Siberian Yupik has further iambic overlengthening, resulting in a change from underlying heavy to a phonetically superheavy syllable (S). In those cases, Central Alaskan Yup'ik changes the first light syllable in what would be a (LH) foot to a heavy syllable which then receives stress. The light to heavy shift is realized as consonant gemination (of the onset) in CV syllables and as consonantal lengthening of the coda in CVC syllables:

Chaplinski:	LHL /qaya:ni/	→	(L'H)L [qayá:ni] [(qa.yá:).ni]	"in another's kayak"	(no change)
St. Lawrence:	LHL /qaya:ni/	→	(L'S)L [qayá::ni] [(qa.yá::).ni]	"in another's kayak"	(overlengthening)
Central Alaskan:	LHL /qaya:ni/	→	('H)('H)L [qayyá:ni] [(qay.yá:).ni]	"in another's kayak"	(gemination)
	LLLHL	→	(L'H)('H)('H)L [qayá:píx:ká:ni] [(qa.yá:).(píx:).(ká:).ni]	"in another's future authentic kayak"	(consonant lengthening)

Note that in the Chaplinski variety because of iambic lengthening there is a neutralization of vowel length contrast in nonfinal stressed syllables.

== Morphology ==
The Yupik languages, like other Eskimo–Aleut languages, represent a particular type of agglutinative language called an affixally polysynthetic language.

Yupik languages "synthesize" a single root at the beginning of every word with various grammatical suffixes to create long words with sentence-like meanings. Within the vocabulary of Yupik there are lexical roots and suffixes that can be combined to create meanings that in most languages are expressed by multiple free morphemes.

Although every Yupik word contains one and only one root that is rigidly constrained to word-initial position, the ordering of the suffixes that follow can be varied to communicate different meanings, principally through recursion. The only exception lies with case suffixes on nouns and person suffixes on verbs, which are restricted to the end of the words in which they occur.

Yupik is an ergative language both in nominal and verbal morphology. It has obligatory polyagreement on all verbs with subject and object but not with the theme of a ditransitive verb.

== Writing systems ==
The Yupik languages were not written until the arrival of Europeans around the beginning of the 19th century. The earliest efforts at writing Yupik were those of missionaries who, with their Yupik-speaking assistants, translated the Bible and other religious texts into Yupik. Such efforts as those of Saint Innocent of Alaska, Reverend John Hinz (see John Henry Kilbuck) and Uyaquq had the limited goals of transmitting religious beliefs in written form.

In addition to the Alaskan Iñupiat, the Alaskan and Siberian Yupik adopted a Latin alphabet originally developed by Moravian missionaries in Greenland beginning in the 1760s, which the missionaries later transported to Labrador.

After the United States purchased Alaska, Yupik children were taught to write English with Latin letters in the public schools. Some were also taught the Yupik script developed by Rev. Hinz, which used Latin letters, which had become the most widespread method for writing Yupik. In Russia, most Yupik were taught to read and write only Russian, but a few scholars wrote Yupik using Cyrillic letters.

In the 1960s, the University of Alaska assembled a group of scholars and native Yupik speakers who developed a script to replace the Hinz writing system. One of the goals of this script was that it could be input from an English keyboard without diacritics or extra letters. Another requirement was that it accurately represent each phoneme in the language with a distinct letter. A few features of the script are that it uses 'q' for the back version of 'k', 'r' for the Yupik sound that resembles the French 'r', and consonant + ' for a geminated (lengthened) consonant. The rhythmic doubling of vowels (except schwa) in every second consecutive open syllable is not indicated in the orthography unless it comes at the end of a word.

== Bibliography ==
- Campbell, Lyle. (1997). American Indian languages: The historical linguistics of Native America. New York: Oxford University Press. ISBN 0-19-509427-1.
- S.A. Jacobson (1984). Yup'ik Eskimo Dictionary Alaska Native Language Center. ISBN 0-933769-21-0
- S.A. Jacobson (2000). A Practical Grammar of the Central Yup'ik Eskimo Language. Fairbanks: Alaska Native Language Center and Program. ISBN 1-55500-050-9[includes a CD with readings by Anna W. Jacobson].
- Mithun, Marianne. (1999). The Languages of Native North America. Cambridge: Cambridge University Press. ISBN 0-521-23228-7 (hbk); ISBN 0-521-29875-X.
- Miyaoka, Osahito. (2012). A Grammar of Central Alaskan Yupik (Cay). Berlin: de Gruyter.
- de Reuse, Willem J. (1994). Siberian Yupik Eskimo: The Language and Its Contacts with Chukchi. Studies in indigenous languages of the Americas. Salt Lake City: University of Utah Press. ISBN 0-87480-397-7.
- "The Inuktitut Language" in Project Naming, the identification of Inuit portrayed in photographic collections at Library and Archives Canada
