= Postbase =

In linguistics, a postbase is a special kind of grammatical suffixing morpheme that is suffixed to a base. It is mostly found in Eskimo–Aleut languages and Formosan Languages. Postbases differ from most other affixes in that they usually carry a much more salient semantic content than affixes in other languages and are semantically more akin to verbs. In Eskimo–Aleut languages meanings such as "to have", "to want", "to think", "to say" are usually expressed by postbases.
