= Proto-Inuit language =

Reconstructed ancestor of the Inuit languages

Proto-Inuit
- Reconstruction of: Inuit languages
- Era: ca. 1000 CE
- Reconstructed ancestors: Proto-Eskaleut: Proto-Eskimoan

Proto-Inuit is the reconstructed proto-language of the Inuit languages, probably spoken about 1000 years ago by the Neo-Eskimo Thule people. It evolved from Proto-Eskimo, from which the Yupik languages also evolved.

== Phonology ==
Doug Hitch proposes the following chart of consonant phonemes:

Consonant phonemes of Proto-Inuit
| | Labial | Apical | Lateral | Palatal | Velar | Uvular |
|---|---|---|---|---|---|---|
| Voiceless | p | t | ɬ | c | k | q |
| Voiced | v | ʐ | l | j | ɣ | ʁ |
| Nasal | m | n | | | ŋ | |
