= Proto-Eskaleut language =

Reconstructed ancestor of the Eskimo–Aleut languages

Proto-Eskaleut
- Proto-Eskimo–Aleut; Proto-Inuit-Yupik-Unangan
- Reconstruction of: Eskaleut languages
- Era: 4000 BC - 2200 BC
- Lower-order reconstructions: Proto-Eskimoan

Proto-Eskaleut or Proto-Eskimo–Aleut (sometimes Proto-Inuit-Yupik-Unangan) is the reconstructed common ancestor of the Eskaleut languages, the family containing Eskimo and Aleut. Its existence is known through similarities in Eskimo and Aleut. The existence of Proto-Eskaleut is generally accepted among linguists. It was for a long time true that no linguistic reconstruction of Proto-Eskaleut had yet been produced, as stated by Bomhard. Such a reconstruction was offered by Knut Bergsland in 1986. Michael Fortescue offered another version of Proto-Eskaleut, largely based on the reconstruction of Proto-Eskimo in the Comparative Eskimo Dictionary he co-authored with Steven Jacobson and Lawrence Kaplan.

== Phonology ==
Fortescue reconstructs the phoneme inventory of Proto-Eskaleut as follows:

Consonants
		Labial	Alveolar		Velar	Uvular
		Labial	plain	palatalized	Velar	Uvular
Nasal		m	n	(nʲ) (Note: */nʲ/ may not have been distinct from */n/; Fortescue reconstructs it for the correspondence of "Sirenikski Eskimo initial /j/, elsewhere /n/".)	ŋ	
Plosive		p	t	tʲ	k	q
Affricate			c (Note: It is not clear from Fortescue's description whether the sounds denoted by */c/ and */cʲ/ were affricates [ts tsʲ] or fricatives [s sʲ].)	cʲ		
Fricative	voiceless		c	cʲ		
Fricative	voiced	v	ð		ɣ	ʁ
Lateral fricative			(ɬ) (Note: */ɬ/ may have been a later development from clusters of */l/ with a plosive.)			
Approximant			l	j (Note: */j/ was most likely a fully palatal approximant, but it is grouped with the palatalized alveolars for convenience.)		

Vowels
	Front	Central	Back
Close	i		u
Mid		ə	
Open		a	

== Possible relation to other language families ==
There are no generally accepted relations between Proto-Eskaleut and other language families. A substantial case for a genetic relationship between Proto-Eskaleut, Yukaghir and Uralic was published by Michael Fortescue in 1998 in Language Relations across Bering Strait (see Uralo-Siberian languages).
