= Proto-Eskimoan language =

Reconstructed ancestor of the Eskimo languages

Proto-Eskimoan
- Proto-Eskimo, Proto-Inuit-Yupik
- Reconstruction of: Eskimo languages
- Era: by ca. 2000 BCE
- Reconstructed ancestor: Proto-Eskaleut
- Lower-order reconstructions: Proto-Inuit; Proto-Yupik

Proto-Eskimoan, Proto-Eskimo, or Proto-Inuit-Yupik, is the reconstructed ancestor of the Eskimo languages. It was spoken by the ancestors of the Yupik and Inuit peoples. It is linguistically related to the Aleut language, and both descend from the Proto-Eskaleut language.

Comparative studies of Eskimo and Aleut languages suggest that the Proto-Eskimoan and Proto-Aleut languages diverged between 4000 and 2000 BCE.

== Phonology ==
According to the International Encyclopedia of Linguistics, "Eskimo languages show variation primarily in their phonology and lexicon, rather than in syntax." In addition, "Proto-Eskimo had four vowels */i a u ə/, but few or none of the long vowels or diphthongs found in the modern languages."
