= North American hunting technologies =

Indigenous hunting technologies

North American hunting technologies begins with the arrival of the Paleo-Natives and continues through to modern times. This article deals exclusively with Aboriginal Canadians and Native Americans in the United States.

== Paleo-Native Period ==
=== Paleo-Native Weapons Technologies ===
The Clovis spear point is found at nearly all locations in North America. It is defined by its relatively large size and fluted morphology that allows it to be hafted onto the end of a spear. It is of some debate if this was a handheld thrusting spear, or a throwing spear, or an atlatl. It could well have been used for all three, including knives, as the bifacial Clovis point is very well made and utilitarian. Typically the points are made from high-quality silicates such as flint, or chert. Often these stone tools are found hundreds of miles from their source stone in caches of semi-complete blanks. It appears they would bury some good material they had brought with them when they traveled, and sometimes either forget where they buried it, or possibly found more high-quality materiel in the new location, and had no need to retrieve the caches.

=== Hunting ===
Tests have been done on the velocity of these large bifaces, and it has been clearly shown that they are capable of wounding and killing modern elephants. The occurrence of tool marks, and bifaces found at kill sites leaves no doubt that Clovis people did in fact kill and hunt mastodons, mammoths, camel, horses, and bison. But could this hunting have caused the mass extinction that came at the end of the Pleistocene, or was it the climate change that did it? A third theory is also emerging, that the colonists and possibly domesticated dogs brought disease with them that caused this extinction.

But the few species that were hunted by humans that became extinct doesn't account for the loss of so many species. The loss of some cornerstone species typically can result in an implosion of population and diversity similar to what we see during the transition from Pleistocene to Holocene. This was probably caused by some loss of major species of vegetation.

=== "Clovis First" ===
There was a previously accepted idea called Clovis First. This theory does not mean that Clovis showed up and had the fluted biface technology, but assumes that over about 1,000 years the original settlers developed the technology, and Clovis was the first successful material culture in North America that became widespread. However, new dates from the Cooper's Ferry site in Idaho circa 15,600 YBP, provide clear evidence for Western Stemmed Tradition points predating evidence of Clovis by >2000 years. <Davis, Loren G. et al 2022 Dating of a large tool assemblage at the Cooper’s Ferry site (Idaho, USA) to ~15,785 cal yr B.P. extends the age of stemmed points in the Americas>

As Waguespack states "Based on optimal foraging models, it is argued that selective predation on high ranked resources, specifically megafauna, is predicted in colonization settings where large game is abundant and human population densities are low." Most people that subscribe to this school of thought tend to believe in the specialized large game hunter societies. This is disputed by some as it has low ethnographic evidence, but the environment was quite different at the time, and with the right technologies and techniques this highly mobile hunter that depended on large game could be reasonable.

=== Distribution ===
The distribution of projectile points, and their variation in morphology tend to move from a north to south gradient, following the model that humans came in from the north and traveled south. Currently what we would like to find in the archaeological record, and what we actually find are disjointed. Even with accurate dates, and faunal floral assemblages, the specific way that these elements interacted is elusive, and remains in the theoretical environment. However these ideas, and the studies that result from them are what has driven information in this field for the past half century.

A third and less subscribed to theory is called the Solutrean hypothesis. Bruce Bradley and Dennis Stanford, have recently resurrected an idea from the 1880s, Charles Conrad Abbott 1881, that claimed that the early colonists came from European roots. Although the Solutrean bifaces look similar to the Clovis technology, lacking only the flute, they are separated in time by about 5,000 years. Solutrian industry lasted from 20,500 BCE, to 17,000 BCE, while Clovis is popularly held to be from 11,500 BCE. Even in the face of modern dating techniques, Bradley and Stanford have continued to lecture, and published papers pursuing this model.

The theory is based on atlatl hunting strategies utilized in a maritime arctic type environment. Stanford and Bradley theorize that people hunting seals would be moving across the ice sheets in groups so they could cover the most breathing holes as prescribed by this technique. In his studies they found that the seals today from northern Europe and north eastern Canada all migrate to Greenland. The theory is that people using something very much like an atlatl to hunt seals and other large aquatic mammals could have followed the wrong group of seals back to North America, and then used this spear based bifacial technology to adapt to the new environment. This would mean that these Paleo-Natives probably had boat technology, and used this spear hunting technology from the ocean, and adapted it to large terrestrial game. The seemingly enormous time gap between Solutrian and Clovis is overcome by the rising sea levels, and peoples dependence on aquatic resources.

This theory makes sense because without a good knowledge of the floral assemblages it would be difficult, if not risky to depend on plant resources for survival. Meat from hunting is reliably nontoxic. As reported by Dennis Stanford in recent lectures (2009), there have been mammoth bones dredged off the shores of Delaware in the Atlantic Ocean, and one of the bones actually has a projectile point in it that is possibly pre-Clovis, but morphologically it is lacking the flute, and nearly identical to the Solutrean biface. This model is contradicting to the genetic mapping based on mitochondrial DNA though, and has many people that disagree. The similarities of the bifacial technology can be explained by independent invention.

The only empirically based evidence is that Clovis people hunted large game. They also killed other small game, but it is always found alongside large game at kill sites. The Clovis point can be found in every corner of the continental United States. This means that at some point either a highly mobile group of hunter-gatherers persisted across the continent, or that a technology was spread across the continent because it was so successful. These points are large enough to kill, and are found at multiple kill sites with megafauna that is now extinct. Studies have shown that even light hunting on large animals can cause extinction. But most data supports the idea that it was climate change that caused the extinctions.

== Archaic-Native Period ==
=== Production Rate of Weapons ===
Many improvements in technology came about through the Archaic Native's increase in social connection. This had many advantages in technology, economics and society. The more constant interaction between groups of Archaic Natives gave opportunity to trade many things with each other. Tools, weapons, strategies, techniques and ideas were all exchanged more frequently and with a wider range of people than the Paleo-Natives. Obviously, this universally improved the living condition of everyone involved and sped the advancement throughout the Early, Middle and Late Archaic age. This speed in technological advancement increased steadily beginning with a slow progression in the Early Archaic age, and ending much more quickly with the immense change from solitary hunting in the Late Archaic age. Projectile technology greatly drew hunters of almost all game together to exchange techniques and technology. This increased interaction not only provided opportunity to learn or teach practices, but to also band together and hunt as a team. This, along with technology and environmental opportunity, helped define the trend of the Archaic Native's integration, practices and social interaction as opposed to solitary hunting. The production of weapons in California increased during the Archaic-Native Period as a result of an increase in social interaction and technology exchange between groups. The more frequent interaction led to the development of specialized hunting techniques and tools, including harpoons, spears, and nets. The exchange of ideas and technologies also fueled the gradual increase in technological advancement throughout the region, leading to the adoption of advanced hunting strategies for marine mammals.

=== Use of Natural Resources ===
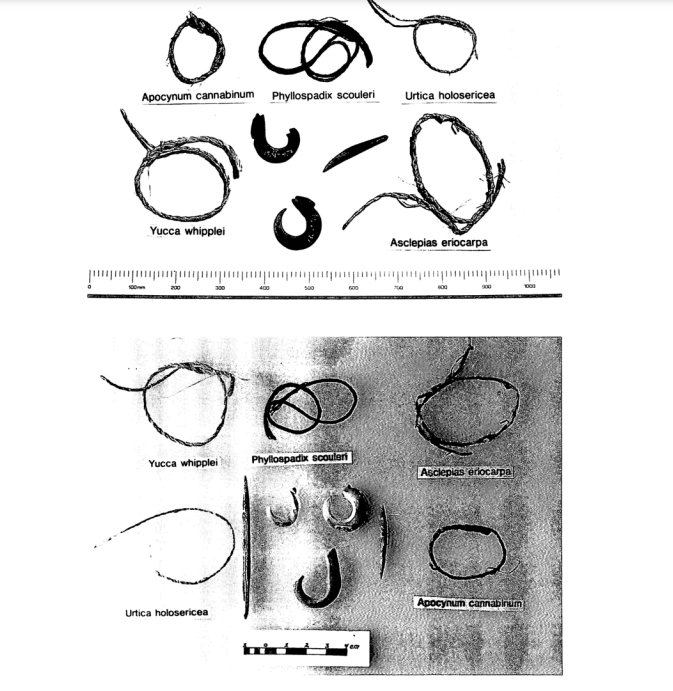
Fishing lines made from native plant fibers used by various Southern California tribes.

One of the distinctions the Archaic Natives had from their predecessors were the characteristics of more complex weaponry. Expendable, smaller projectiles were favored over the larger melee weapons. There were many fuels for change outside of the obvious advantages over this type of weapon in use though; the environment being one, if not the only factor. The newer availability of resources in the post-glacial age not only changed the abundance of weapons, but also the type. Being less concerned with the availability of local weapon materials, the Archaic Natives favored cheap, fast and easy weapons. This meant, for most Archaic Natives, projectiles. Coastal foraging was an important part of life for Archaic Native Americans on California's Channel Islands. They harvested plant resources from the coastal environment, including kelp, seaweed, berries and seeds. They also collected birds' eggs and hunted small game such as squirrels and rabbits. The Natives also fashioned tools and weapons from local materials such as flint, obsidian, and bone. Other uses of natural resources include fibers from various plants to weave fishing lines. Plants such as yucca, nettle, Indian hemp, and milkweed are harvested and prepared to create different fishing lines.

=== Projectile Weapons ===
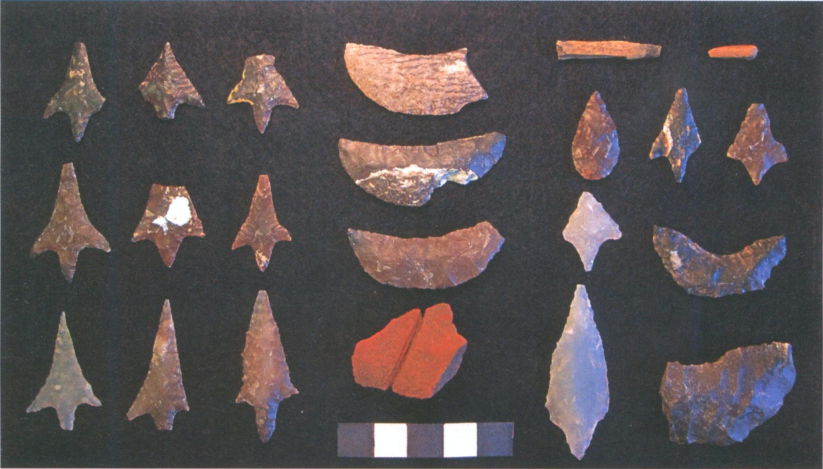
Paleolithic projectile weapons found on the California Channel Islands.

Projectile weapons have the great disadvantages of limiting their use and breaking often. But, as stated earlier, the abundance of local materials meant that a brand new dart or arrow could be made quickly and cheaply. This also produced an interesting trend in technology. The Clovis tipped spears of the Paleo-Natives required a remarkable amount of skill and familiarity with the material. Each spear head had a great deal more care and skill taken in its creation. The larger size and persistence to the user meant that the user also cared a great deal more about its quality. Many of the Clovis tips surviving today have remarkable characteristics that only a truly experienced individual could create. Many of the marks on the Clovis tips are done with a single blow. Being that these are from larger rocks and less expendable, it is safe to assume there was a relatively low failure rate concerning the probability of error. One would have to assume that a great deal of familiarity was present in the craftsmen about the physical characteristics of the local rocks. The smaller, flying weapons of the Archaic age meant less time and care was taken into the tips, and with this habit, there became less familiarity with the rocks. Also, the habitual migration and interaction with others meant trade happened more often. The complexity, and quality of the Clovis tips was relatively quickly replaced by the cheaper, inferior tips of the Archaic age. Although this style was obviously more efficient, it is interesting to see the devolution of material craftsmanship brought about from the change in climate and lessening concern for scarcity. One of the most common projectile weapons used was the atlatl, or spear-thrower. Unlike other projectile weapons, the atlatl could throw projectiles with greater force and accuracy than could be achieved by hand. In addition to harpoon-tipped spears, California Natives in the coasts also used a variety of other projectile weapons for hunting fish, including bows and arrows. These weapons were typically made from wood and had specialized arrowheads designed for hunting in water.

=== Fishing Technology ===
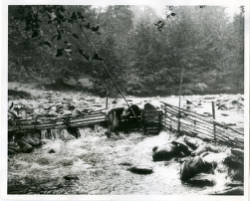
This is an example of the Weirs and traps utilized by the Yurok people to catch fish in the Klamath River.

For thousands of years, the Yurok people of the Klamath River have used sustainable methods to perpetuate future salmon runs. One method that ensured the tribe's subsistence needs was the construction of temporary communal fish dams. The construction of the fish dams were highly ritualized as they were built over a period of ten days using ten panels and only fished for ten days. Nets constructed from iris leaf fibers were used to ensnare migrating fish, while weirs of log frames directed fish into specific sections and openings. Fishing technology utilized by the Chumash and Gabrielino tribes were made of plant fibers and sometimes human hair. These lines were not able to support substantial weight, resulting in breakage. This factor limited early California Native Americans to catching fish closer to the shore. Fish that inhabited the coast of Southern California 3,500 years BP included anchovies, bonito, mackerel, and sardines. Not only did the Native Californians consume fish, but shellfish as well. Shellfish shells can be found in areas that they inhabited. The Chumash were known to have used a pry bar to harvest them. Over time and with the development of new hunting technology, the shellfish population decreased. It showed there was a preference towards estuary shellfish to marine shellfish. The consumption of shellfish is also dependent on different factors, such as harvesting techniques and the condition of the mussel beds. Beds that are not harvested frequently would have more shellfish on average. California Natives would have collected shellfish and turban snails by plucking, a more sustainable method that targeted larger individuals while also collecting the smaller, surrounding mussels.

=== Early Archaic ===
The Early Archaic age "... widely is viewed as a time of human adaptation to Holocene, post glacial climatic conditions". Coming directly out of a colder, much more glacier dominated landscape, the strain on resources relaxed greatly. In the glacial northeast preceding the Early Archaic age, the inhabiting occupants' energy capture strategies were vastly different from those adapted from the warmer weather of the Archaic. Groups of inhabitants in this much colder and harsher climate adapted techniques and habits with the aim of conserving energy and maximizing utility. This meant that much smaller bands of people would remain together throughout the year, ensuring less of a strain on a particular area. The smaller demand that a small band of hunters in this cold climate imposed was much easier to cope with the scarcity of available resources. Less mouths to feed meant that kills could be made less often, and with more gain per member. In the newer, warmer climate of the Archaic age, groups could be larger without added strain on local resources. The increase in faunal growth in this warmer and wetter climate also gave new possibilities in the social interaction between separate groups and societies. Mobility became easier and safer, and was less of a necessity pushing outward for survival and more of a pull-factor, enticing the hungry and opportunistic Archaic Natives who, at this time, were much more social due to the lack of glacial scarcity. "In brief, Early Archaic settlement is thought to have been characterized by: (1) settlement systems emphasizing logistically based organizational strategies, incorporating variations in Binford and Binford's (1966) base camp/extraction-station dichotomy (e.g. Chapman 1985; Gardner 1977, 1983 Goodyear et al. 1979; House and Wogaman 1978; Morse 1971, 1977) or alternatively (2) frameworks emphasizing a high degree of residential mobility".

== Twentieth Century Hunting Technologies ==
=== Material Culture and Hunting Technologies of the Inuit ===
To begin the understanding of more modern hunting technologies in modern civilizations, the origins of hunting techniques must be examined. Many of the Inuit tribes up in, and around Canada were, until the late 20th century, excellent examples of both modern and pre-modern hunting techniques. These indigenous peoples have lived off the Arctic coast and plains for thousands of years and have learned to adapt to their environment, but they also have modernized their methods as contemporary weapon technology has come into the global market. The use of the rifle has decreased the energy needed to hunt prey from further distances than previously allowed, with traditional methods. Depending on the type/size/caliber of the weapon typically determines what type of metal will be used. Also, the bigger the calibre of the gun, the easier it is to obtain bigger prey and increase the general diet. Before the use of the rifle, it would have taken more energy to hunt, stalk and kill a caribou, particularly while the herd was on the move. However, with the rifle, its increased accuracy and range, more meat is available to be distributed to the families in the tribe. Also, the skins from the animal can be turned into leather, rawhide, or use the furs to keep warm.

However, rifles were not the only weapon used; there were other hunting technologies available, such as the winter harpoons and summer harpoons. Winter harpoons, such as the toggling harpoon, were made of wood, iron, and brass. The iron was used for the shaft while brass was typically used for hook. The handle of the harpoon was made of wood that is tightly attached to the iron shaft. These harpoons were fairly small and narrow for they were used primarily to stab seals from their breathing hole under the ice. Once the hunter has set up his hunting area, he would stand by the breathing hole until he knows there is a seal on the under-side. The seal was then brought to the surface and transported back to the community where the women and children waited. There are many uses for seal such as food, blubber for fuel, hides for warmth, and bone to create more weapons.

These thrusting spears were not the only type that was used, but there was also a summer version of the winter harpoon; the summer harpoon was composed of all natural materials such as wood and ivory from a walrus tusk. These harpoons were bigger and weighed much more for they were used to hunt larger animals such as bearded seals and walruses. Wood is once again used for the handle while the walrus tusk is used as the shaft because of its straightness. The brass hook was also replaced with ivory for it is heavier and sturdier.

=== Inuit groups, modern globalization and development ===
For hundreds and thousands of years, the many diverse Inuit communities in the Arctic and subarctic have survived on traditional forms of hunting. Until recently, with the expansion of the western ideas and ideologies, technology and cultural ideas have remained untouched, but new technologies have played a role in modern-day hunting techniques. As mentioned earlier, one of their hunting technologies is now the gun, which has dramatically improved hunting efficiencies. "Since when boating [guns] must be kept ready at hand in case a seal suddenly bobs up within range,". Before the introduction of this technology, hunters would instead have been armed with some sort of thrusting spear such as a harpoon in hopes of catching a meal. With the introduction of the gun, not only can there be more accuracy in killing the animal, but also quickness and readiness of response time.

This group, being as primitive as they are (according to Western ideology), has come in the global economy, even if it is ever so slightly. With use of guns, they must have had purchased it from somewhere, for none of the Inuit groups makes guns. In exchange for money, the hunters will sell furs, seal meat, and skins; however, guns are not the only modernized technology that these groups have adapted too, but also snowmobiles which allow for easy transportation, along with faster distance traveling. The consumption of gasoline is also prevalent in society, and once again, gas is another commodity that they must purchase if they wish to continue modernized hunting practices. In 1971, when William B. Kemp was observing the Inuit on Baffin Island in Canada, he recorded that 885 US gal (3,350 L; 737 imp gal) of gasoline was consumed.

While snowmobiles may makeup the quickest transportation means for the Inuit, they still relied on dog sledding until the 1980s. Most of the food that was once fed to the sled dogs who pulled the sleighs was meat from seals, caribou, walruses, or whatever form of food was available at the time. But even dog food has been modernized, and 12.8 million kilo-calories were imported: one hundred and twenty-eight billion calories, which if converted to the human two thousand calorie diet, would be able to feed six hundred and forty thousand people. When put into perspective, with the temperature being as cold as it, more body heat has to be produced, and with the amount of running and the weight of sleds the dogs pull, that more energy consumption that is needed in order to maintain a state of homeostasis and good nutrition for each dog.
