= Ada Eyetoaq =

Inuk artist

- Born: 1934
- Died: 2014 (aged 79–80)
- Known for: Miniature soapstone sculptures

Ada Eyetoaq (alternatively: Eyetoaq Eyetoaq, Kingilik Eyetoaq, Iyi'tuaq Eyetoaq, Eeyeetoaq Eyetoaq, Eyeetoaq Eyetoaq, Eeyeetowak Eyetoaq, Iyi'tag Eyetoaq, Eetoowa Eyetoaq, Eyittuak Eyetoaq, Eeyeeteetowak Eyetoaq, Iti'tuaq, Eeeyeetowa, Eda) (1934-2014) was a Baker Lake (Nunavut) Inuk artist who produced traditional Inuit art. She is primarily known for her miniature soapstone sculptures.

== Personal life ==
Eyetoaq married James Kingilik, also a soapstone sculptor, in the early 1950s. They had seven children, five biological and two adopted. In 1968 they moved from their traditional Inuit camp at Beverly Lake to the Baker Lake settlement. After moving, they lived in a tent for two months due to a lack of housing. It was around this time that the couple began their work as sculptors in order to supplement their incomes.

== Art ==
Besides her sculptures, Eyetoaq also created drawings, prints, wool duffels, and felt wall hangings. But, her carvings are what have brought her notoriety, especially those involving the human form. She began carving in the 1970s and became one of Baker Lake's most respected female artists. Her work has been auctioned at a wide range of prices from the 100s to the 1000s.

=== Soapstone sculptures ===
Eyetoaq drew inspiration from her family's traditional Inuit background, especially the hunting and trapping aspects of her culture. Her carvings are primarily of human figures, but she also did work representing animals such as bears, fish, or birds. Often her work more specifically represents women, or mothers with children.

=== Collections ===
- Amon Carter Museum of American Art
- Canada Council Art Bank: Ottawa
- Canadian Museum of History
- Clifford E. Lee Collection, University of Alberta: Edmonton
- Inuit Cultural Institute: Rankin Inlet
- Macdonald Stewart Art Centre
- Musee des beaux-arts de Montreal
- Museum of Anthropology, University of British Columbia: Vancouver
- Prince of Wales Northern Heritage Centre: Yellowknife
- Red Deer and District Museum and Archives: Red Deer
- University of Alberta: Edmonton
- Winnipeg Art Gallery

=== Publications ===
Ada Eyetoaq: Recent Sculpture/Sculpture Récente, 1979 Canadian Arctic Producers Cooperative Ltd.
