= Boeing YQM-94 B-Gull =

Type of unmanned aerial vehicle

YQM-94 B-Gull Compass Cope B
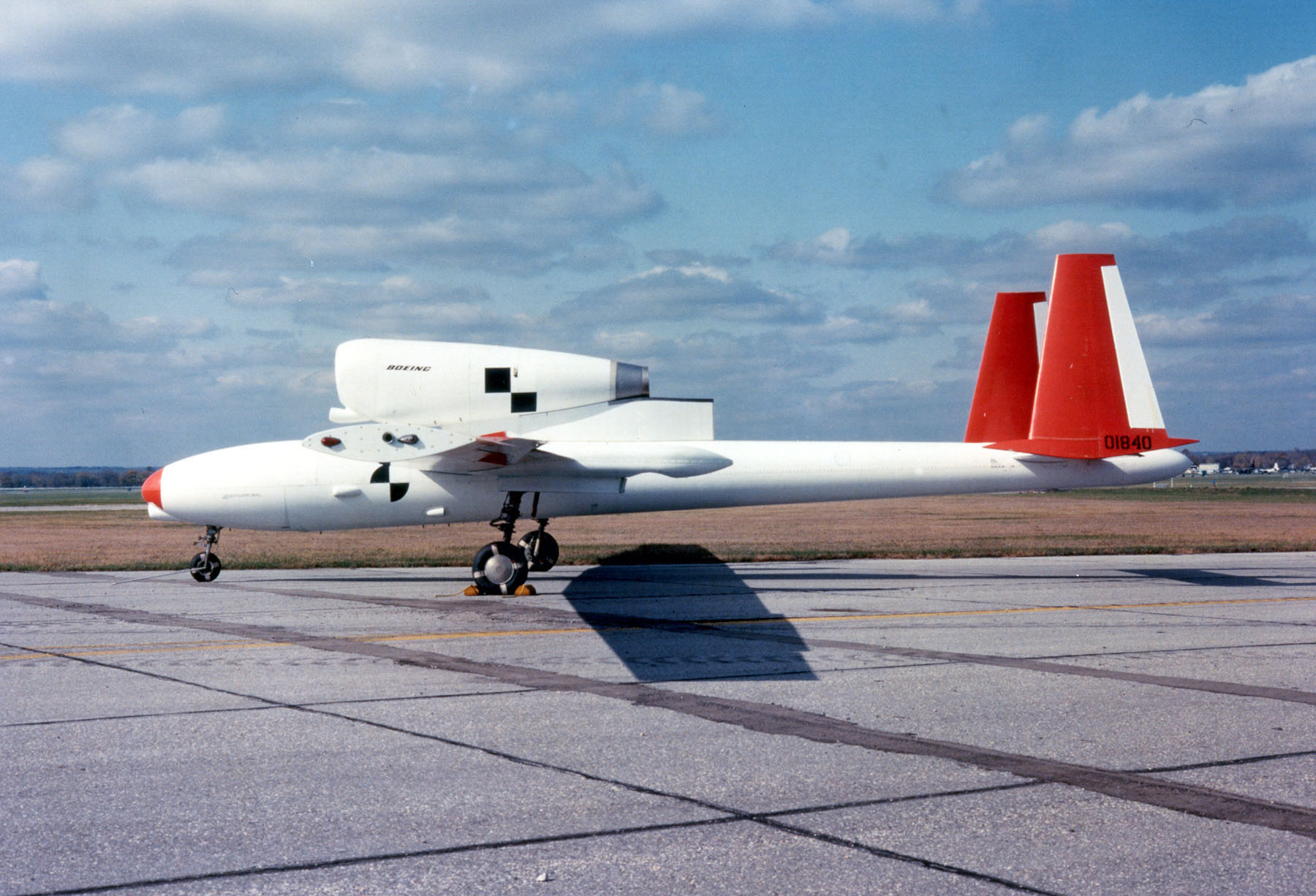
- Boeing YQM-94A Compass Cope B at the National Museum of the United States Air Force.

General information
- Type: Unmanned Aerial Vehicle (UAV)
- Manufacturer: Boeing
- Status: Canceled
- Primary user: United States Air Force

History
- First flight: 28 July 1973

The Boeing YQM-94 B-Gull (also called Compass Cope B) is a developmental aerial reconnaissance drone developed by Boeing. It could take off and land from a runway like a manned aircraft, and operate at high altitudes for up to 24 hours to perform aerial surveillance, communications relay, or atmospheric sampling.

== Design and development ==
Compass Cope was a program initiated by the United States Air Force (USAF) in 1971 to develop an upgraded reconnaissance drone that could take off and land from a runway like a manned aircraft, and operate at high altitudes for up to 24 hours to perform surveillance, communications relay, or atmospheric sampling. Two aircraft, the Boeing YQM-94 Compass Cope B, and the Ryan Aeronautical YQM-98A Compass Cope R participated in the program.

Boeing was originally selected as a sole source for the Compass Cope program, with the USAF awarding the company a contract for two YQM-94A (later YGQM-94A) demonstrator vehicles in 1971. However, Ryan then pitched an alternative, and the next year the USAF awarded Ryan a contract for two YQM-98A (later YGQM-98A) demonstrators as well.

The Boeing YQM-94A is a cantilever shoulder-wing monoplane, basically a jet-powered sailplane, with long straight wings, a twin fin tail, retractable tricycle landing gear, and a turbojet housed in a pod on its back. The engine was a General Electric YJ97-GE-100 providing 5,270 lb (2,390 kg) thrust. The YQM-94A was constructed using aluminium and fiberglass. The lower half of the circular-section fuselage was glass-fibre honeycomb, the same material used for radomes. The wings of the YQM-94A were constructed of aluminium-skinned honeycomb with a fiberglass core which insulated the fuel tanks from the cold encountered at the altitudes it was flown.

Since the YQM-94A was a demonstrator, it used some off-the-shelf components to reduce costs. The datalink was based on the AN/TPW-2A X-band radar. The flight control system was derived from a system developed by the Sperry Corporation for the Beechcraft QU-22B Pave Eagle. The Compass Cope B was controlled remotely from the ground with no autonomous guidance capability. A television camera in the nose allowed it to be remotely flown by a ground-based pilot. The undercarriage for the YQM-94B came from a Rockwell Commander. The YQM-94's fuselage sits lower than the Rockwell Commander, so Boeing used this as a lift-dumping system. As the aircraft settled down on its specially strengthened nose wheel, the wing was placed in a negative angle of attack.

The remote control system was tested using a Cessna 172 aircraft over a ten-month period. Boeing choose the Cessna 172 because its approach speed and wing loading were close to that of the YQM-94. At the end of 1971, the YQM-94 remote control system had been tested during 150 flights using eight different remote pilots to control the Cessna 172. Ninety of those flights occurred at night with a low light level television system. A safety check pilot was on board the Cessna 172 as it was flown remotely from the ground. On three occasions, this pilot took over manual control of the Cessna to avoid collisions with other aircraft and during a failure of the remote control system.

Initial flight of the first YQM-94A demonstrator was on 28 July 1973, at Edwards Air Force Base. This aircraft crashed on its second flight on 4 August 1973. The prototype was lost because a damaged piece of mylar insulation caused an electrical short-circuit in a rudder accelerometer. The erroneous signals generated by this accelerometer caused random rudder movements. This problem was compounded by an erroneous airspeed indication for the ground pilot and a control problem because the left wing was heavier than it should have been. These problems resulted in a hard landing which caused irreparable damage to the first prototype.

The second demonstrator performed its first flight on 2 November 1974, and completed the evaluation program. Later tests of this aircraft included a successful endurance flight of 17 hours 24 minutes at altitudes of more than 55,000 feet (16,800 m). This aircraft was retired to the National Museum of the United States Air Force in September 1979.

Ryan's entry into the competition was an updated variant of the Model 154 / AQM-91 Firefly, which it called the Model 235. Initial flight of the first Compass Cope R demonstrator was in August 1974. However, the Boeing Compass Cope B won the competition in August 1976 on the basis of lower cost, with the company awarded a contract to build preproduction prototypes of the YQM-94B operational UAV.

Since the evaluation of the Compass Cope prototypes had shown the Ryan YQM-98 to be superior to the Boeing YQM-94A in some respects, Ryan challenged the award. However, that challenge became less relevant when the entire Compass Cope program was cancelled in July 1977, apparently because of difficulties in developing sensor payloads for the aircraft.

== Specifications ==
Data from Jane's All the World's Aircraft 1973-74

General characteristics

- Length: 42 ft 0 in (12.80 m)
- Wingspan: 90 ft 0 in (27.43 m)
- Gross weight: 13,000 lb (5,897 kg)
- Powerplant: 1 × General Electric J97-GE-100 non-afterburning turbojet , 5,270 lbf (23.4 kN) thrust

Performance

- Endurance: 30 hours 0 minutes
- Service ceiling: 70,000 ft (21,340 m)

== See also ==
Aircraft of comparable role, configuration, and era

- Ryan YQM-98
