= J97 =

J97 can refer to:

- General Electric J97, a turbojet engine designed and built by General Electric
- Jack – J97, Vietnamese singer
