= Dassault Falcon 20 =

Midsize business jet

Falcon 20 (Mystère 20) HU-25 Guardian
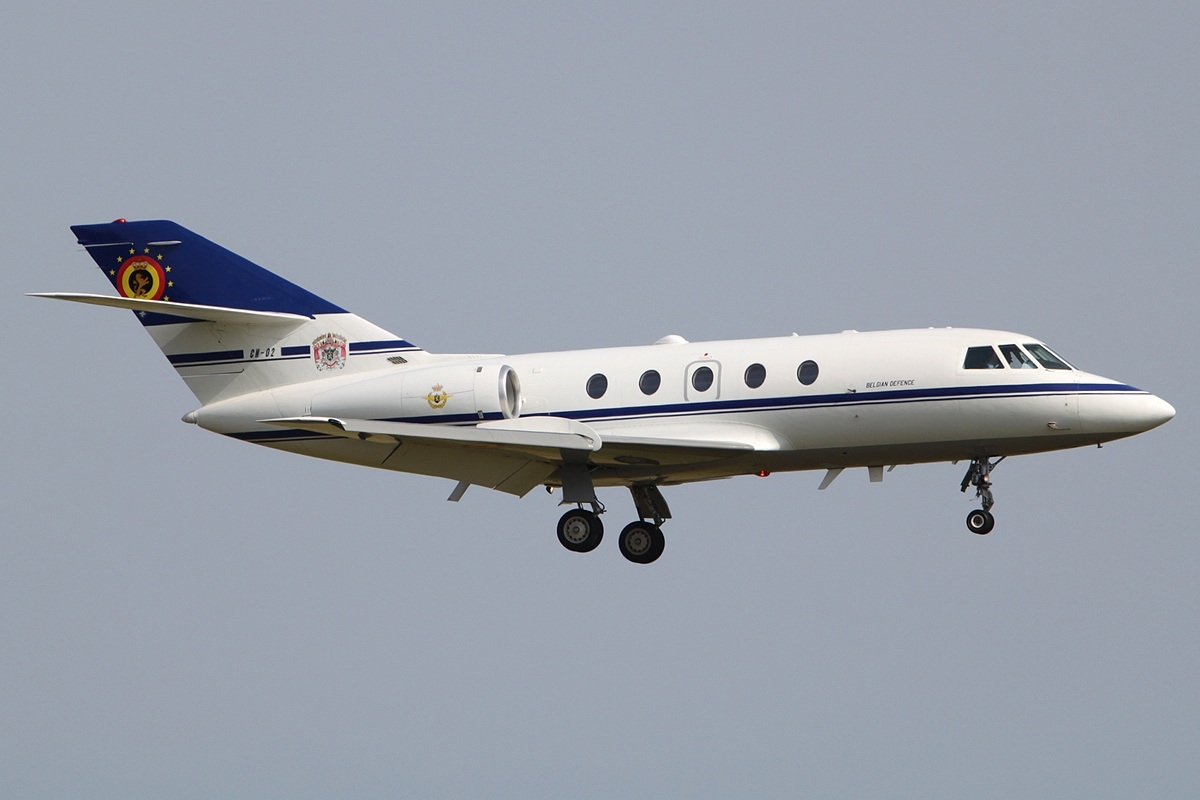
- A Dassault Falcon 20E of the Belgian Air Force

General information
- Type: Business jet
- Manufacturer: Dassault Aviation
- Status: Out of production, in active service
- Primary users: Federal Express (formerly) French Navy; United States Coast Guard
- Number built: 512

History
- Manufactured: 1965–1991
- Introduction date: 3 June 1965
- First flight: 4 May 1963
- Developed into: Dassault Falcon 10; Dassault Falcon 50

The Dassault Falcon 20 is a French business jet developed and manufactured by Dassault Aviation. The first business jet developed by the firm, it became the first of a family of business jets to be produced under the same name; of these, both the smaller Falcon 10 and the larger trijet Falcon 50 were direct derivatives of the Falcon 20.

Initially known as the Dassault-Breguet Mystère 20, approval to proceed with development of the aircraft was issued during December 1961. It is a low-wing monoplane design, powered by a pair of rear-mounted General Electric CF700 turbofan engines. On 4 May 1963, the prototype made its maiden flight. The first production aircraft was introduced on 3 June 1965. On 10 June 1965, French aviator Jacqueline Auriol achieved the women's world speed record using the first prototype.

As a result of an early distributor arrangement with American airline Pan Am, American-delivered aircraft were marketed under the name Fan Jet Falcon; it soon became popularly known as the Falcon 20. American orders proved valuable early on; by 1968, Pan Am Business Jets Division had placed orders for 160 Falcon 20s. Further major orders were soon placed for the type by several operators, both civil and military; amongst others, these included the French Navy, the United States Coast Guard, and Federal Express.

An improved model of the aircraft, designated the Falcon 200, was developed. This variant, powered by a pair of Garrett ATF3 engines, featured several major improvements to increase its range, capacity, and comfort. Additionally, a number of Falcon 20s that had been originally powered by the CF700 engines were later re-engined with Garrett TFE731 turbofan engines. The aircraft proved to be so popular that production did not end until 1988, when it had been superseded by more advanced developments of the Falcon family. Due to the increasing implementation of noise-abatement regulations, the Falcon 20 has either been subject to restrictions on its use in some nations, or been retrofitted with Stage 3 noise-compliant engines or hush kits upon its non-compliant engines. The type has also been used as a flying test bed and aerial laboratory by a number of operators, including NASA. In November 2012, a Falcon 20 had the distinction of becoming the first civilian jet to fly on 100% biofuel.

== Development ==
=== Origins ===
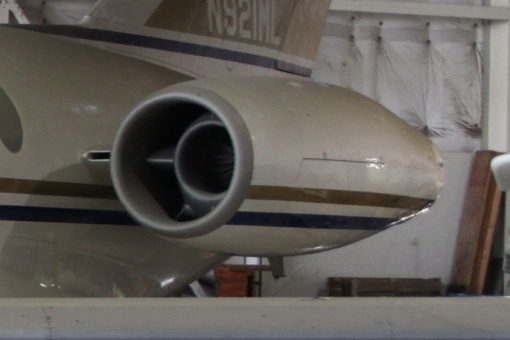
The General Electric CF700 nacelle with its distinctive bypass intake

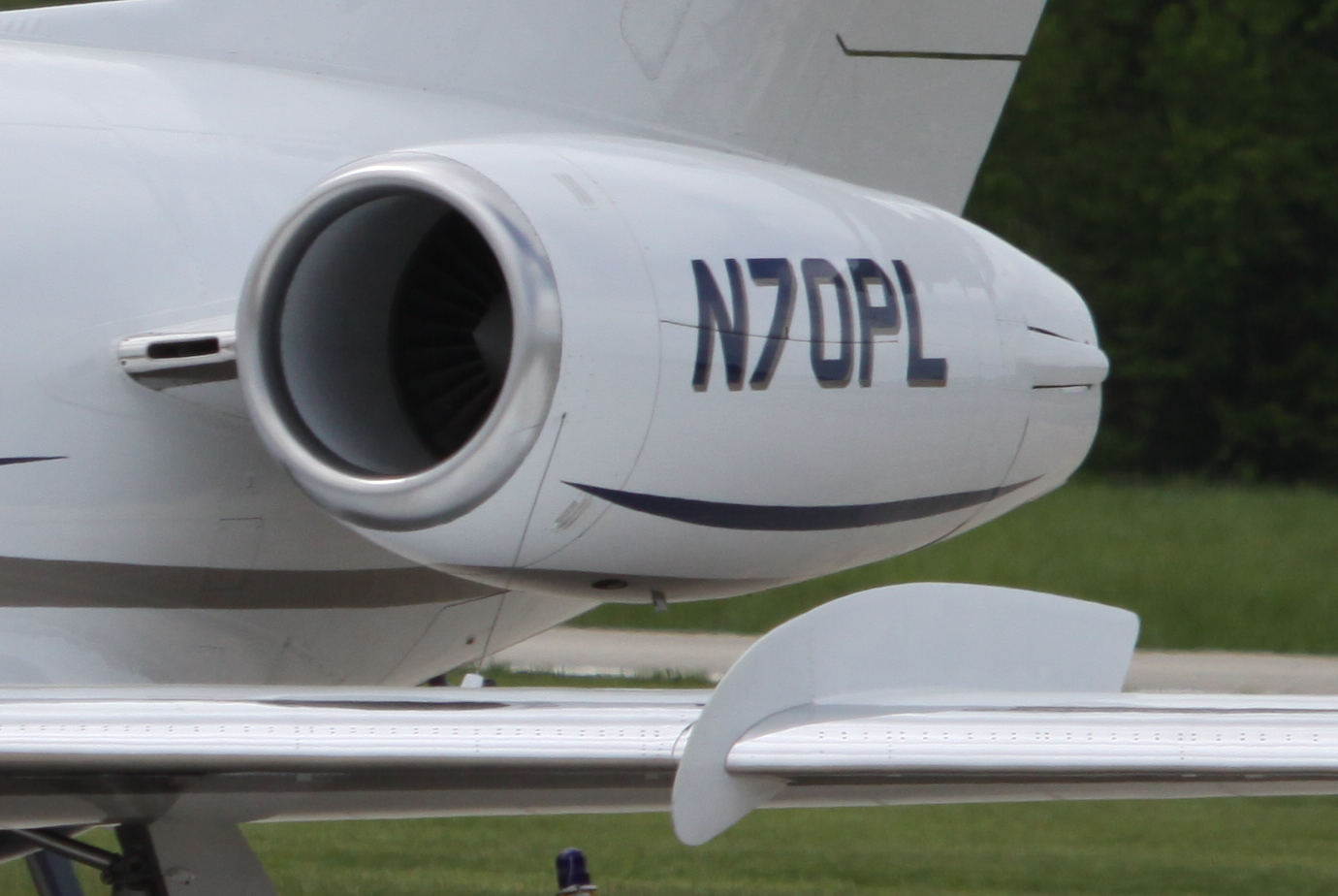
The later Garrett TFE731 nacelle with a conventional intake

During the 1950s and 1960s, the French government, which had taken a significant interest in the re-establishment and growth of its national aviation industries in the aftermath of the Second World War, developed a detailed request for a combined liaison/trainer aircraft, to be equipped with twin-turbofan engines. Among those companies that took interest in the government request was French aircraft manufacturer Dassault Aviation. In December 1961, French aircraft designer and head of Dassault Aviation, Marcel Dassault, gave the go-ahead to proceed with work towards the production of an eight- to 10-seat executive jet/military liaison aircraft, which was initially named as the Dassault-Breguet Mystère 20. The emerging design was of a low-wing monoplane, which drew upon the aerodynamics of the transonic Dassault Mystère IV fighter-bomber, and was equipped with a pair of rear-mounted 14.68 kN (3,300 lbf) Pratt & Whitney JT12A-8 turbojet engines.

On 4 May 1963, the Mystère 20 prototype, registered F-WLKB, conducted its maiden flight from Bordeaux–Mérignac Airport, Gironde, France. By this stage, attention in the programme was centered around the commercial opportunities for the type, particularly the large North American market. According to aerospace publication Flying, while Dassault had achieved satisfactory technical progress on the Mystère 20, it was recognised even by the company's officials that the firm lacked both the sales presence and the experience to effectively market the type to English-speaking nations. Accordingly, the option of directly selling the type was discarded in favour of seeking an established US distributor. Coincidentally, management at Pan Am happened to be seeking a suitable aircraft to launch its planned corporate jet aircraft sales division, and following a review of a range of available business jets of the era, took an interest in the Mystère 20.

Progress between Dassault and Pan Am was rapid, moving from engineering evaluations of the type to the formation of general agreements between the two companies. In response to feedback received from Pan American, the aircraft was re-engined with a pair of General Electric CF700 engines and several dimensions were increased. Accordingly, Pan American formed an agreement with Dassault to distribute the Mystère 20 in the western hemisphere; the firm placed an initial order for 40 aircraft along with options for a further 120. On 10 July 1964, the re-engined aircraft made its first flight. On 1 January 1965, the first production aircraft performed its maiden flight; in June 1965, both French and American type certifications were awarded. On 10 June 1965, French aviator Jacqueline Auriol achieved the women's world speed record using the first Mystère 20 prototype, having flown at an average recorded speed of 859 km/h over a distance of 1000 km.

Deliveries of the type soon commenced to Pan American's outfitting facility at Burbank Airport, California. All non-American aircraft were fitted out prior to delivery at Bordeaux-Merignac. During 1966, the company redesignated the American-delivered aircraft as the Fan Jet Falcon; this was subsequently shortened to the Falcon 20. During 1967, Pan Am Business Jets Division decided to increase their firm orders for the type to 160 Falcon 20s. Military orders for the type were quickly received from Australia, the U.S., and Canada, in addition those placed by France.

In 1973, FedEx's Falcons, designation FA-20-DC, cost $1.2 million each and were modified with a 55-by-74.5-inch forward cargo door with independent power supply, higher mtow, reinforced floor, plugged windows, and bigger brakes.

=== Further development ===
A number of Falcon 20s that had been originally powered by CF700 engines were later re-engined with Garrett TFE731 engines under AMD-BA Service Bulletin No. 731. To distinguish these re-engined aircraft from those still using the original powerplant, they were redesignated with a "-5" suffix inserted after the model number. Volpar Inc. was involved in a program to re-engine the Falcon 20 with the Pratt & Whitney Canada PW305 engines; however, work on the program was abandoned before a Federal Aviation Administration (FAA) STC was awarded.

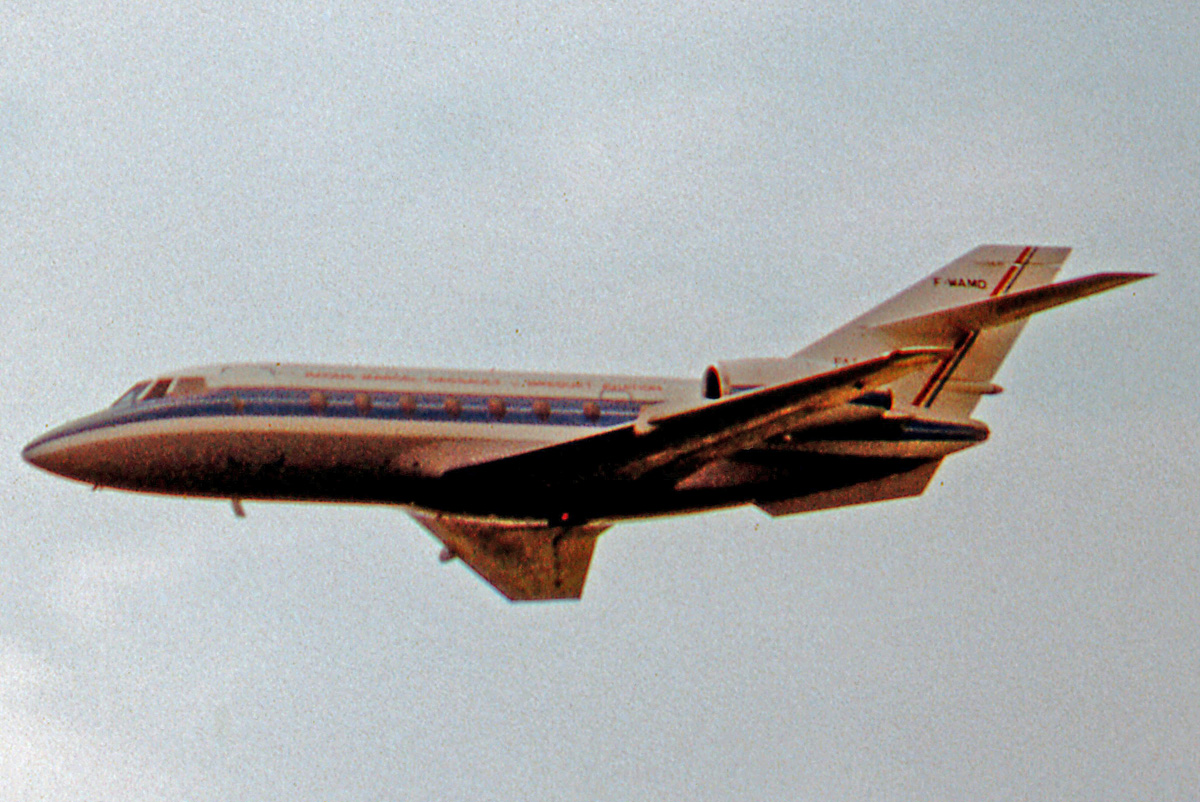
The sole Falcon 30 30-seat aircraft, intended for airline use

An improved model of the aircraft, designated the Falcon 200, was developed, which featured more advanced jet engines and other major improvements to increase range, capacity, and comfort. The Falcon 200, along with the Falcon 20G and HU-25 models, were powered by a pair of Garrett ATF3 engines. According to the magazine Flying, the Falcon 200 variant was more comparable to the newer Falcon 50 trijet than the original Falcon 20 model.

Due to its popularity, Dassault studied and worked upon various variants and extensive derivatives of the Falcon 20. Later-built developments of the type include the smaller Falcon 10; the larger 30-seat Falcon 30 with a larger fuselage cross section, which was built and test flown, but did not proceed to production; and the Falcon 50, an improved three-engined development. The Falcon 20 proved to be so popular that production was not terminated until 1988, when it had been superseded by more advanced developments of the Falcon family. A total of 473 Falcon 20s and 35 Falcon 200s had been constructed by the end of the type's production.

During 2013, the FAA modified 14 CFR part 91 rules to prohibit the operation of jets weighing 75,000 pounds or less that were not Stage 3 noise compliant after 31 December 2015. The Falcon 20 was listed explicitly in Federal Register 78 FR 39576. Any examples of the type that had not been modified, either by the installation of Stage 3 noise-compliant engines or have had hush kits installed upon noncompliant engines, were no longer permitted to fly anywhere in the contiguous 48 states after 31 December 2015. However, 14 CFR §91.883 Special flight authorizations for jet airplanes weighing 75,000 pounds or less – lists special flight authorizations that may be granted for operation after 31 December 2015.

== Design ==
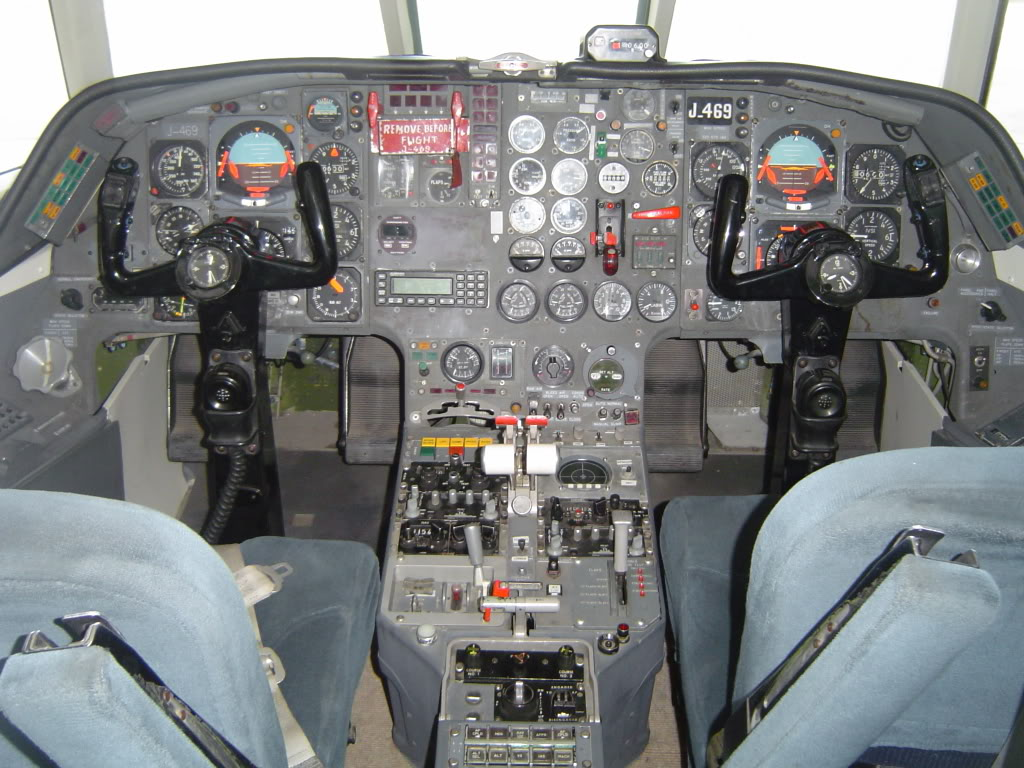
Cockpit of a Pakistan Air Force Falcon 20

The Dassault Falcon 20 is a French business jet, often considered to be an easy to fly and relatively visually appealing aircraft. The favourable flight qualities of the aircraft meant that no need existed to incorporate a stick pusher or stall-barrier systems to achieve its predictable stall behaviour. The flight controls of the Falcon 20 are hydraulically powered, augmenting the mechanical pushrods between the cockpit controls and the flight control surfaces. In the event of complete hydraulic failure, the aircraft can be practically flown without any augmentation. The controls incorporate an artificial feel system, optimising the sensations perceivable to the operating pilot to be smooth, predictable, and precise. On the Falcon 200, the cockpit is heavily modernised, being more comparable with the newer Falcon 50 than the original Falcon 20.

The Falcon 20 is powered by a pair of rear-mounted turbofan engines; most commonly powered by a pair of General Electric CF700 engines, the type has also been powered by alternative powerplants, including the Garrett TFE731 and ATF3 engines. The adoption of newer engines often had the benefit of improving the Falcon 20's range in addition to increased speed and climb rate; this, in combination with its low-drag fuselage, required more careful speed planning than the majority of business jets. On some models, protection against engine conditions such as instances of over-speed and over-heating is provided by electronic flight computers, as is the aircraft's 'throttle-lock' power management system to maintain safe levels of engine power throughout climbs without any crew commands. As conventional thrust reversers are not compatible with the location of the engines, an alternative configuration in the form of rotatable doors fixed to the outer cowling of the engine partially cover both the engine fan and core exhaust, deflecting thrust upwards and forwards.

The Falcon 20 is furnished with a highly swept wing; it is equipped with leading-edge slats to improve its slow speed performance and decrease the stalling speed. When approaching a high angle of attack, the slats are automatically deployed; when nearing a potential stall, the inner section of the slats then retract to provide for a stable and predictable stall with effective aileron controls throughout. On the Falcon 200 model, the wing was re-profiled for improved low-speed performance and shortened runway requirements, as well as the addition of an unusual wing root fillet section and a shortened wing fence; the development of an entirely new wing was under consideration at one point, but the improved performance was not viewed to justify the expense. While air brakes are present upon the wing, these are less smooth and more noisy than the use of the dual-brake arrangement upon the landing gear. For ease of movement on the ground, a fully steerable nosewheel is incorporated and is controlled from the captain's position in the cockpit.

Supplemental Type Certificate SA5858SW, issued by the American Federal Aviation Administration (FAA), and held by Falcon Jet Corporation allows for the installation of underwing pylons upon the Fan Jet Falcon, Fan Jet Falcon Series D and Fan Jet Falcon Series E. This modification has been commonly used upon those Falcon 20s which have been operated as special mission aircraft, which would often make use of underwing stores. Substantial numbers of Falcon 20s were converted into cargo-carrying configurations; a hydraulically-operated cargo door served to simplify loading-unloading operations. According to Flying Magazine, upon its launch, the Falcon 200 model had the largest cabin of any mid-size business jet. Additionally, the rear fuselage of the Falcon 200 was re-designed to accommodate a 28-cubic foot baggage compartment within the tailcone, which supplements the standard aft cabin baggage compartment.

== Operational history ==
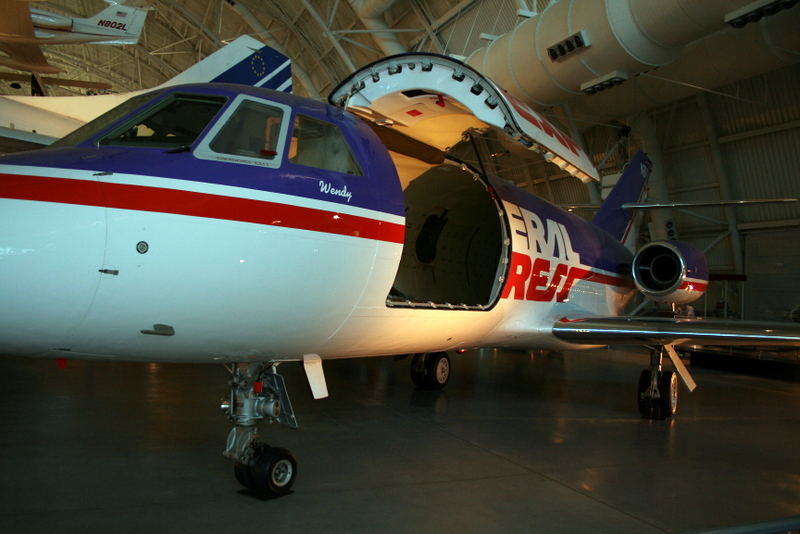
Federal Express Falcon 20 N8FE (cn199) with custom 6' wide cargo door on display at the Smithsonian

=== Commercial, corporate, and private use ===
While sales in the North American market was initially strong, sales were negatively impacted by the Recession of 1969–70, which led to excess unsold Falcon 20 aircraft temporarily building up while Pan American Business Jets Division sought sales of the type. By late 1973, American sales had recovered while responsibility for sales had been transferred to the Falcon Jet Corporation, an organisation jointly staffed by Pan American and Dassault personnel in which Dassault became the pre-dominant partner in the venture. Additionally, by this point, Dassault were already preparing for the launch of a smaller and improved derivative of the aircraft onto the market, which was marketed as the Dassault Falcon 10.

During the late 1950s and early 1970s, aviation businessman Frederick W. Smith was seeking an ideal aircraft with which to launch his new business, Federal Express; Smith soon identified the Falcon 20 as showing promise for his purposes, noting the availability of unsold aircraft due to an economic downturn and its atypically strong fuselage, the latter factor lending itself well to cargo operations. Despite difficulties securing the necessary finances, the fledgling company was able to acquire several Falcon 20s and convert them for cargo operations. Originally, Federal Express intended for its Falcon 20s to be delivered post-conversion, as a consequence of funding issues, the aircraft were acquired in handfuls and independently converted from their initial passenger-carrying configuration to support their use for cargo operations. In September 1972, Federal Express established an in-house training school, focused on the preparation of ex-military pilots for commercial operations using the Falcon.

In April 1973, Federal Express commenced its air express package delivery service using Falcon 20s out of its distribution centre in Memphis, Tennessee. By its third year of operation, the airline had established a nationwide network using the Falcon 20 as its principal aircraft and had become profitable. As a consequence of rapidly increasing demands, it was recognized around this point that the introduction of larger cargo aircraft to supplement the type would soon be necessary in order to expand. At the height of its use of the type, Federal Express operated a fleet of 33 Falcon 20s. The type was eventually withdrawn following the gradual replacement by substantially larger aircraft, the first of these being the Boeing 727-100. The Falcon 20 which had carried the first Federal Express air express package has since been placed on static display at the Smithsonian's Udvar-Hazy Center at Dulles Airport.

=== U.S. Coast Guard ===
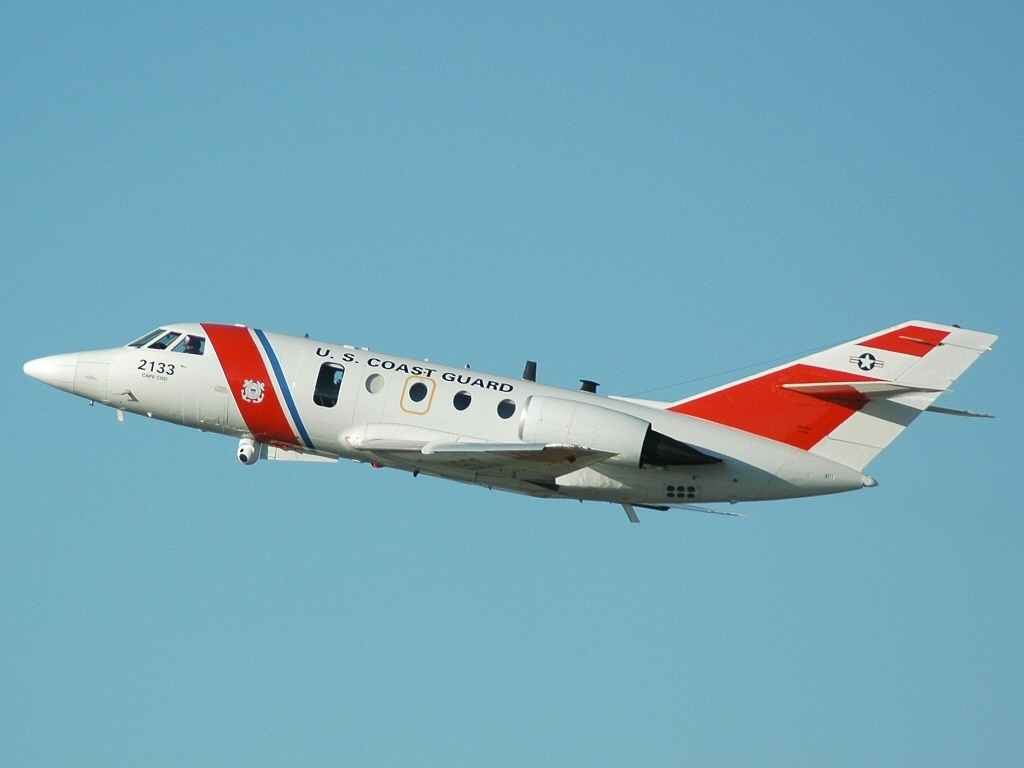
A USCG HU-25C Guardian, 2004

The United States Coast Guard (USCG) operated a model of the Falcon 20, designated as the HU-25 Guardian. The Guardian was operated as a high-speed spotter aircraft to locate shipwreck survivors and direct slower-moving aircraft and rescue vessels, and to interdict aerial and shipborne drug trafficking. In 1982, the first HU-25 was delivered to the USCG; by December 1983, a total of 41 aircraft had been acquired. In USCG service, the HU-25 was eventually succeeded in its role by the EADS HC-144 Ocean Sentry, a newer turboprop-powered aircraft.

Operationally, the HU-25 played a key role in the service's activities in search and rescue, counter drug missions; it had also been a critical asset deployed during the 1991 Gulf War. Initial models of the HU-25 were delivered to the HU-25A standard; a number were later modified to become HU-25Bs, which were equipped with sensors capable of detecting oil spills and other environmental pollutants. Further numbers were re-configured to the HU-25C standard, for improved performance in the drug interdiction mission; when equipped with newer AN/APG-66(V)2 and AN/APS-143B(V)3 radar systems, these became the HU-25C+ and HU-25D respectively. On 26 September 2014, following 32 years of service, the last operational HU-25 Falcon, the only jet ever to be a part of the operational air fleet of the US Coast Guard, was retired. The high-speed capability it provided was lost with the type's retirement due to its replacements being considerably slower aircraft.

=== Aerial testbeds ===
In 1988 the United States Coast Guard tested a Falcon 20C (tail-number N200GT) using Garrett TFE1042 afterburners. This required adding a titanium heat shield to the tail due to the engine mount position.

In 1990, the United States Air Force acquired N20NY (cn 61), a Falcon 20C, for use as a testbed at MIT Lincoln Laboratory. In 2006, the USAF also acquired Coast Guard HU-25A 2125, registered as N448TB (cn 439), for use at Lincoln Laboratory. Sometime in the mid to late 2000s, N20NY was retired and donated to a local community college, with N448TB also being retired and donated to the same school in June, 2022.

In 2011, NASA acquired a former Coast Guard HU-25C for use in Operation IceBridge. The aircraft, based at NASA's Langley Research Center in Hampton, Virginia, is equipped with a scanning laser altimeter to collect data on Arctic surface topography.

During November 2012, a Falcon 20 became the first civil jet in the world to fly on 100 per cent biofuel when it performed a test flight for Canada's National Research Council.

== Variants ==
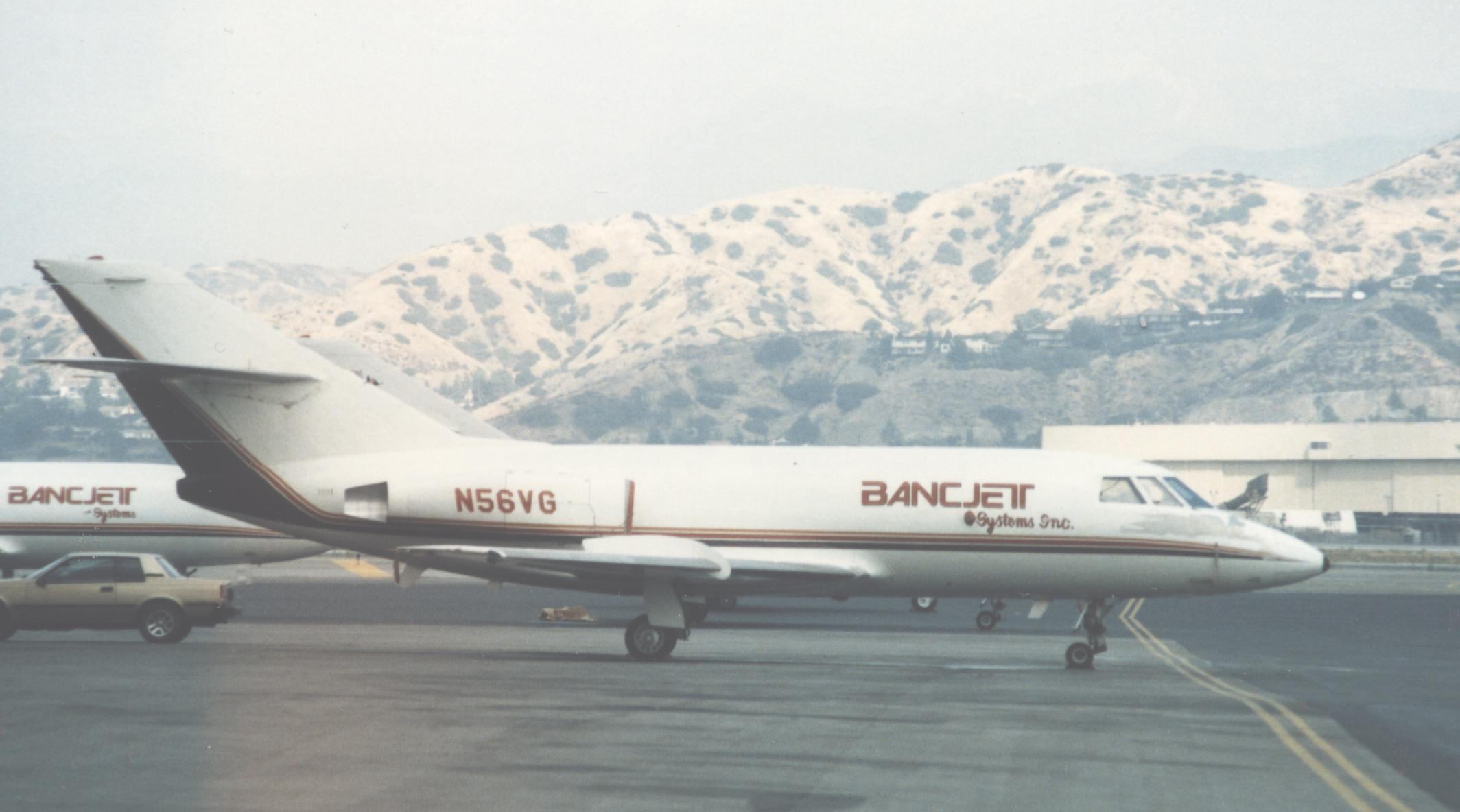
Falcon 20DC freighter of Bancjet Systems at Burbank airport near Los Angeles in September 1986. Note deleted cabin windows

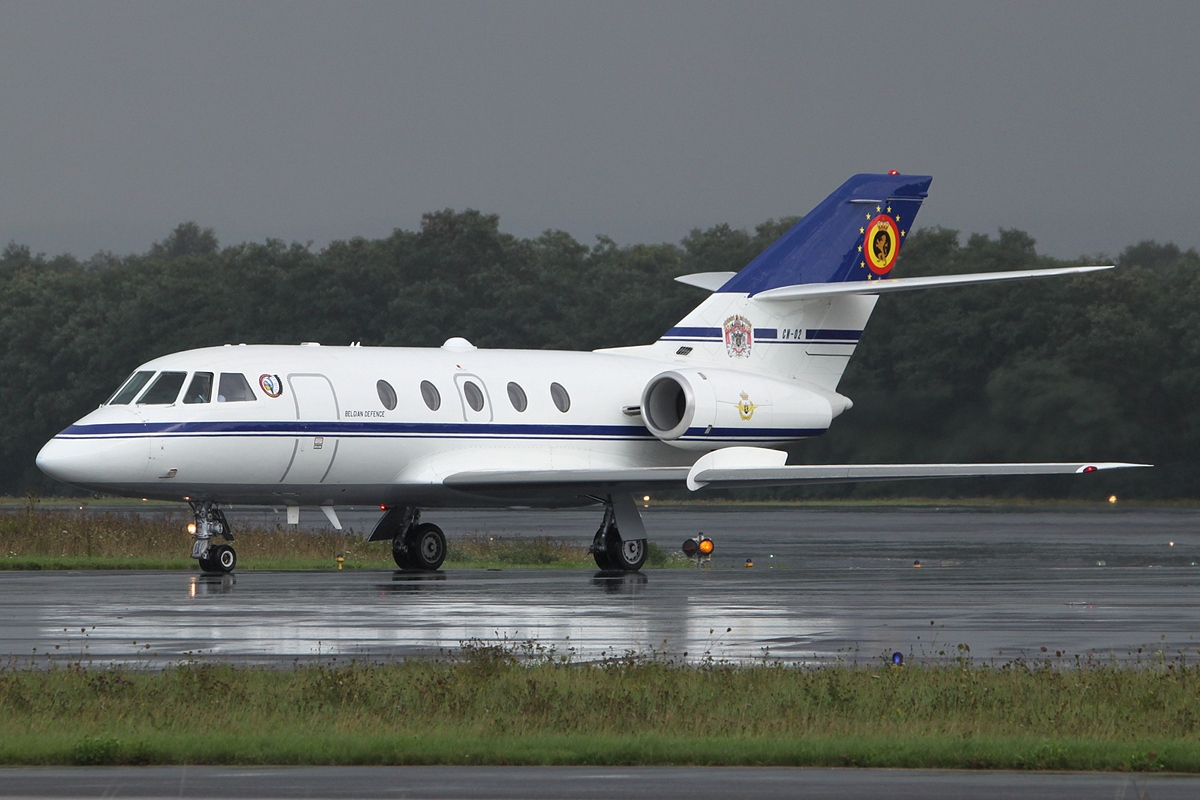
A Belgian Air Force Falcon 20E, August 2010

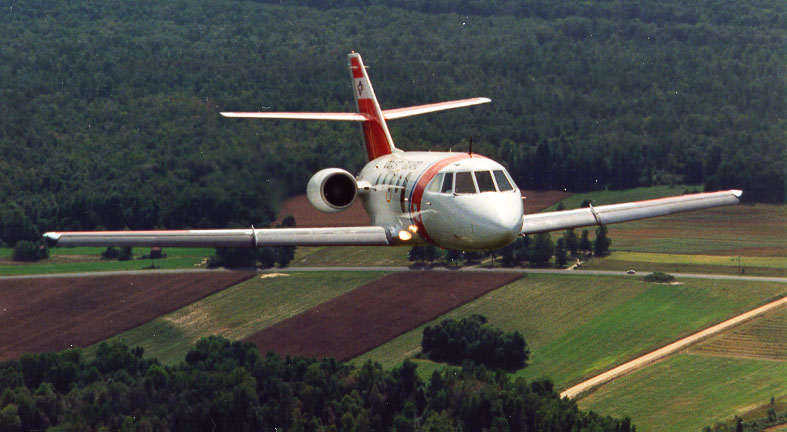
A USCG HU-25 Guardian

Mystère/Falcon 20
Prototype, one built. F-WLKB, initially powered by two 14.68 kN (3,300 lbf) Pratt & Whitney JT12A-8 turbojet engines. Now stored at Musée Air et Espace Aéroport Paris – Le Bourget.
Mystère/Falcon 20C
Initial production version, with lengthened fuselage compared to first prototype and with 10–12 seats. Powered by 4,200 lbf (19 kN) CF700-2B engines.
Falcon 20CC (s/n 073)
Modified Falcon 20C, with modifications for unpaved runway operations (larger wheels, low-pressure tyres, reinforced belly skin, and deleted main gear doors).
Mystère/Falcon 20D
Higher thrust engines (General Electric CF700-2D) and lower fuel consumption and more fuel capacity.
Mystère/Falcon 20E
Higher thrust engines (General Electric CF700-2D-2), higher zero fuel weight.
Mystère/Falcon 20F
Full leading-edge droop flaps and more fuel capacity.
Falcon 20FH
This was the original designation of the Falcon 200 prototype.
Falcon 20G
Maritime patrol and surveillance version, equipped with two Garrett AiResearch ATF3-6-2C turbofan engines.
Falcon 20H
This was the original designation of the Falcon 200.
Falcon 200
Improved variant, powered by two 2360-kg (5,200-lb) Garrett ATF3-6A-4C turbofan engines and with more fuel. First flown on 30 April 1980.
Falcon ST
This designation was given to two Falcon 20s used by the French Air Force as systems training aircraft. The aircraft were equipped with the combat radar and navigation systems of the Dassault Mirage IIIE.
HU-25A Guardian
United States Coast Guard version of the Falcon 20G. 41 built. Equipped with two Garrett AiResearch Garrett ATF3-6-2C turbofan engines.
HU-25B Guardian
Pollution control version for the US Coast Guard equipped with side-looking airborne radar (SLAR) under fuselage. Seven converted from HU-25As.
HU-25C Guardian
Drug interdiction version for the US Coast Guard, equipped with a Westinghouse APG-66 search radar and WF-360 Forward looking infrared turret. Nine HU-25As converted.
HU-25C+ Guardian
Upgrade of HU-25C, with improved AN/APG-66(V)2 radar and new FLIR turret. All nine HU-25Cs converted.
HU-25D Guardian
Upgraded HU-25A, with AN/APS-143B(V)3 Inverse synthetic aperture radar (ISAR) and same FLIR as HU-25C+. 15 upgraded.
Guardian 2
Maritime patrol and surveillance version of the Falcon 200. Never put into production.
CC-117
Canadian military designation of Falcon 20C from 1970.
Fan Jet Falcon
The Falcon 20 was marketed in North America under this name.
Falcon Cargo Jet (Falcon 20DC)
Conversion of Falcon 20 to light cargo aircraft. 33 purchased/converted by FedEx Express for overnight courier service.
Falcon 20C-5, 20D-5, 20E-5, 20F-5
Falcon 20 aircraft equipped with Garrett TFE731-5AR-2C or TFE731-5BR-2C engines. Also includes adaptation of bleed air, anti-ice, hydraulic, fuel, electrical and engine control systems and installation of ATTCS (automatic takeoff thrust control system).
Falcon 30
Enlarged, 30-passenger commuter airliner derivative of Falcon 20, powered by two 27.0 kN (6,070 lbf) Lycoming ALF 502D turbofans. One prototype built, first flying on 11 May 1973. No further production of Falcon 30 or proposed 40-passenger, shorter-range Mystére 40-100.

== Operators ==
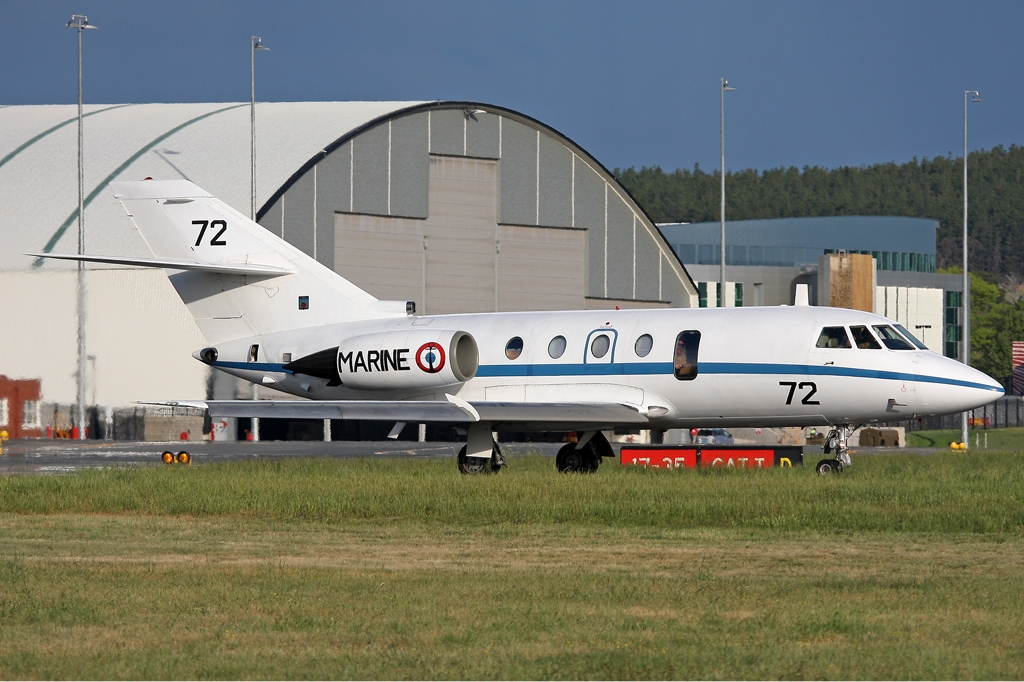
A French Navy Falcon 20G in 2009

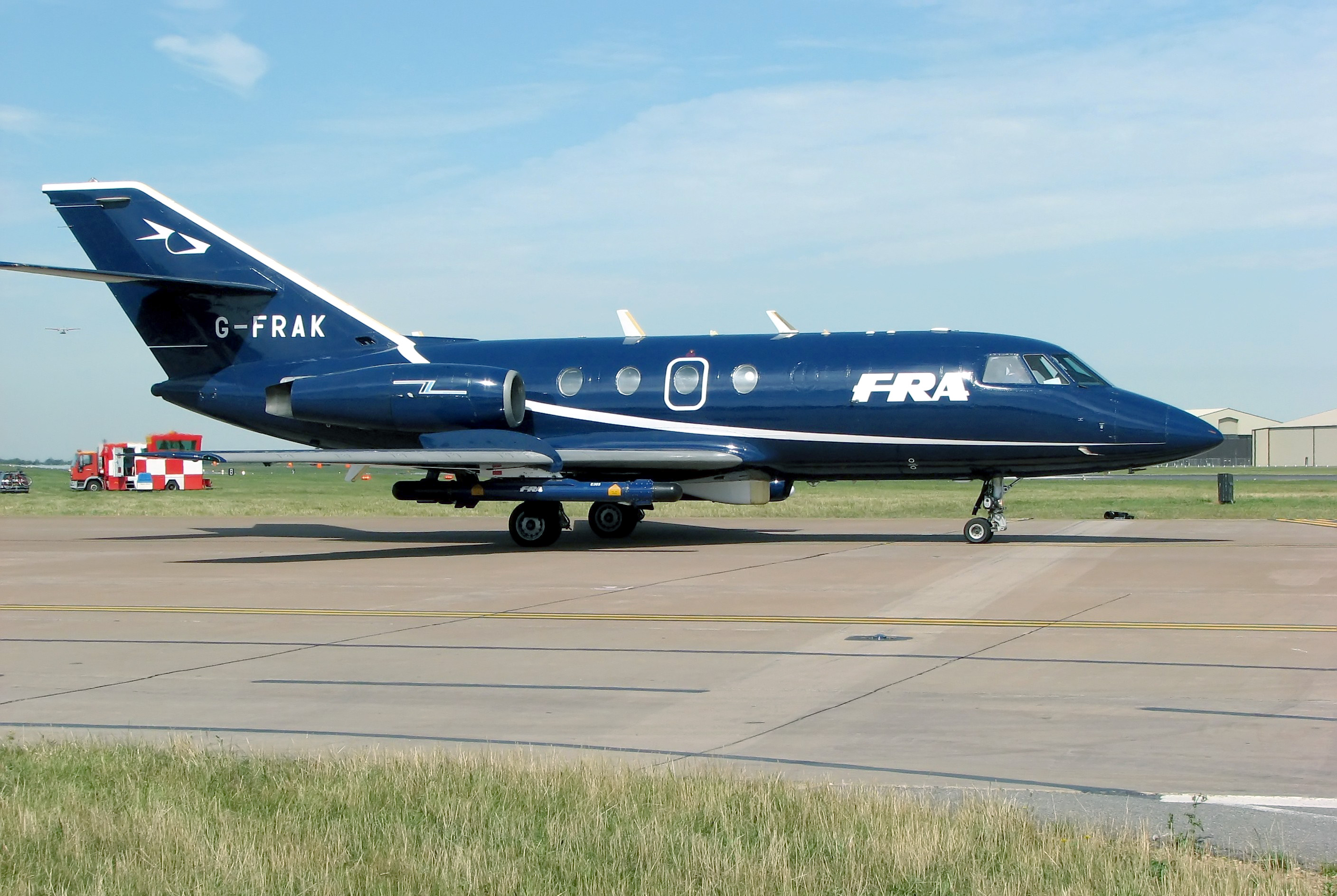
A FR Aviation Falcon 20D in 2006

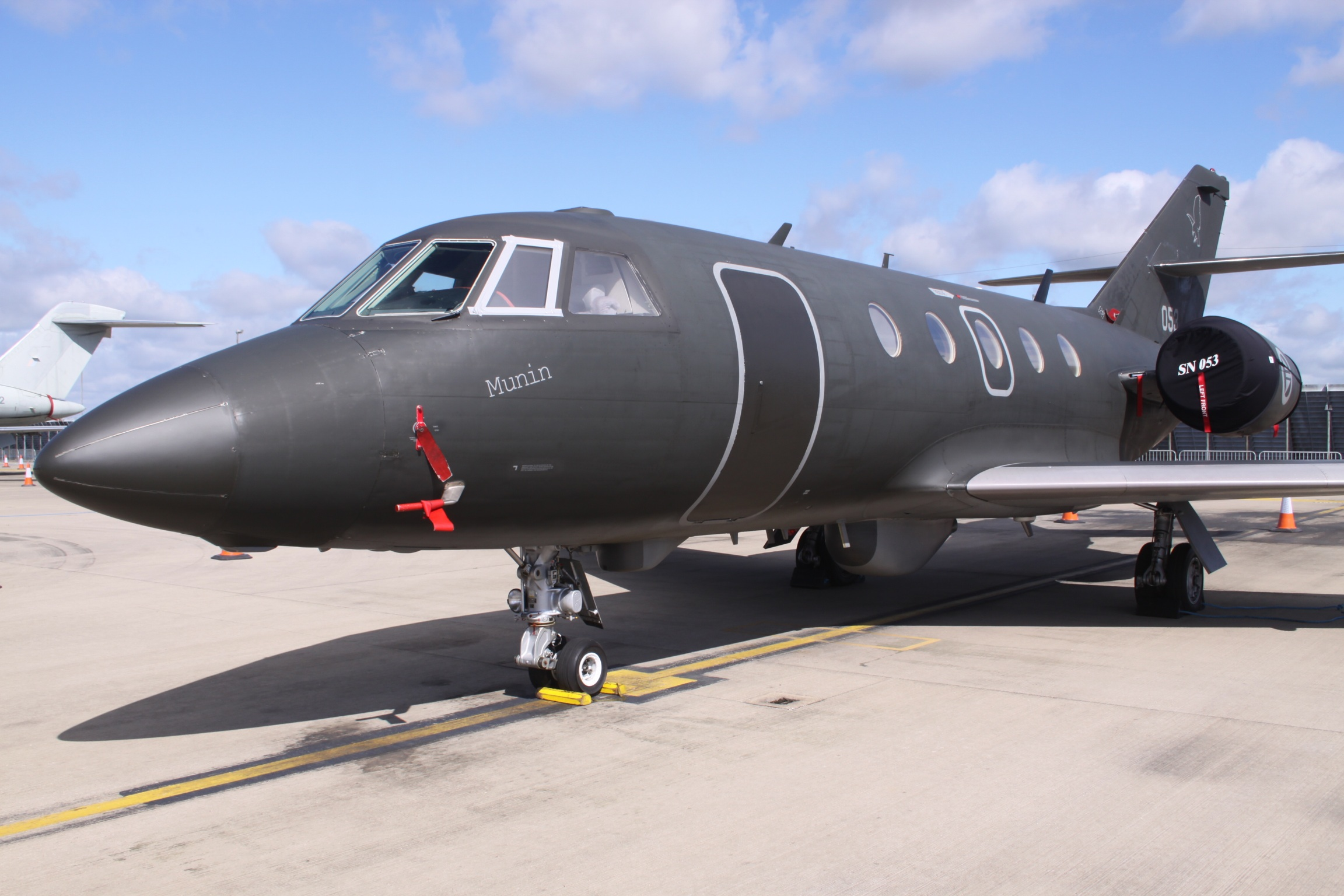
A Royal Norwegian Air Force Falcon 20

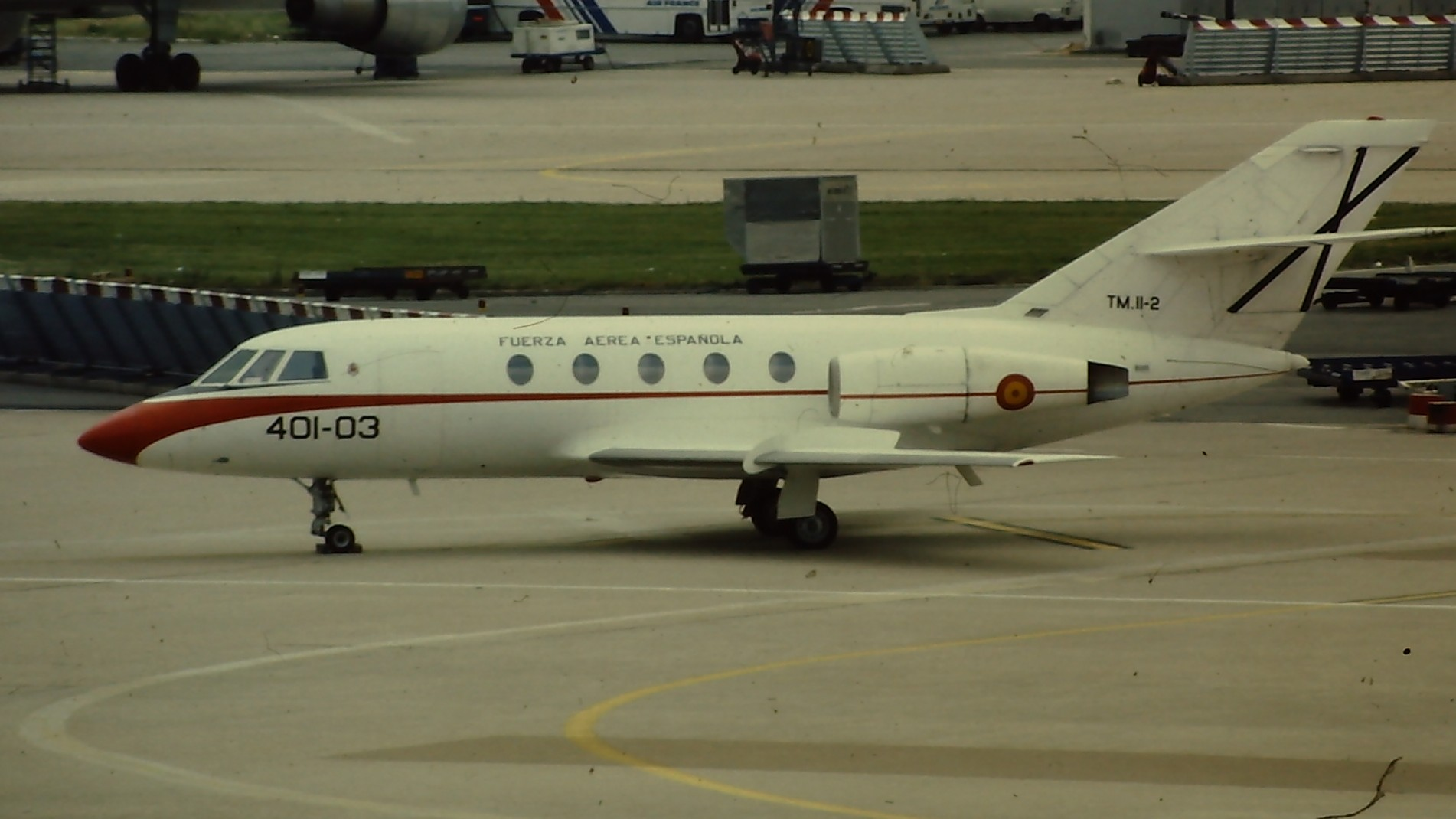
A Spanish Air Force Falcon 20D in 1981

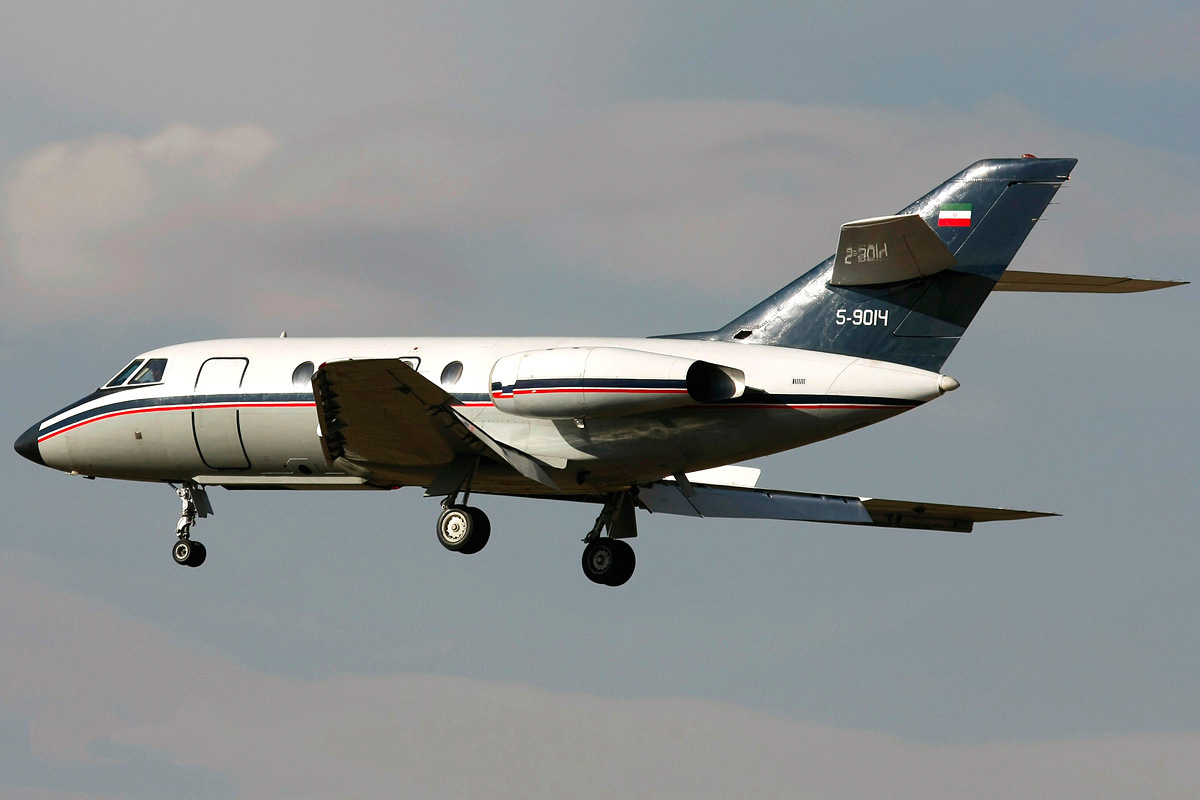
An Islamic Republic of Iran Air Force Falcon 20 in 2009

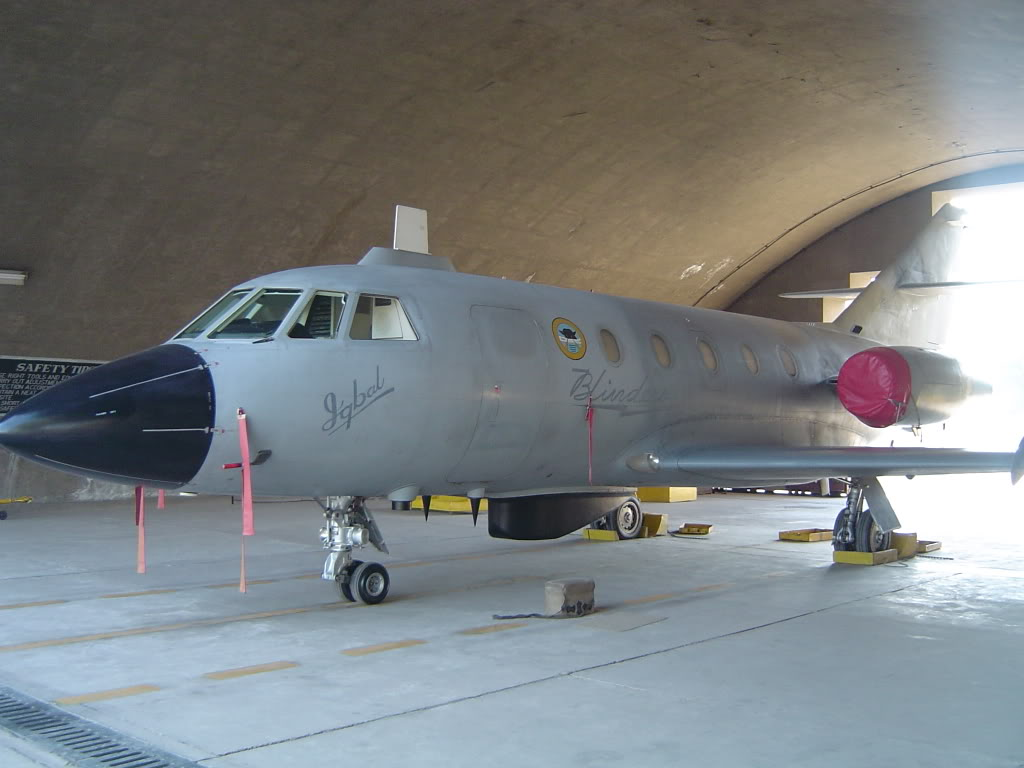
A Pakistan Air Force Falcon DA-20 EW, ECM, ESM aircraft

=== Current civilian operators ===
United States

- USA Jet Airlines
- Alliance Air Charter
- Kalitta Charters
- Ameristar Jet Charter
- IFL Group Inc.
- Sierra West Airlines

Mexico

- Private

United Kingdom

- Draken Europe (formerly FR Aviation/Cobham Limited)

France

- Aerovision
- Service des avions français instrumentés pour la recherche en environnement

Germany

- German Aerospace Center

South Africa

- Guardian Air

Australia

- FalconAir

Canada

- Air Nunavut
- National Research Council

=== Former civilian operators ===
Nigeria

- Imani Aviation (defunct charter company)

United States

- Pan Am
- Grand Aire Express
- Phoenix Air
- Fedex Express
- Ameriflight/California Air Charter

=== Current military operators ===
Djibouti

- Djibouti Air Force

Egypt

- Egyptian Air Force

France

- French Navy

Iran

- Imperial Iranian Air Force, later Islamic Republic of Iran Air Force as well as Islamic Republic of Iran Army Aviation
- Imperial Iranian Navy, later Islamic Republic of Iran Navy (Navy Aviation)
- Iranian Revolutionary Guards Corps

Japan

- Japan Coast Guard

Pakistan

- Pakistan Air Force – 3 in service, including 2 DA-20s in EW, ECM, ESM roles

Spain

- Spanish Air and Space Force

Sudan

- Sudanese Air Force

Syria

- Syrian Air Force

Tunisia

- Tunisian Air Force

Venezuela

- Venezuelan Air Force

=== Former military operators ===
Algeria
Angola
Australia

- Royal Australian Air Force – Three in service from 1967 to 1989.
  - No. 34 Squadron RAAF

Benin

- Benin Air Force

Belgium

- Belgian Air Component – 2 Falcon 20E-5 operated from 1973 as VIP aircraft. Retired 22 December 2016.

Canada

- Royal Canadian Air Force
- Canadian Forces
  - 412 Transport Squadron and No. 414 Squadron RCAF 1970–1989 as CC-117

Central African Republic
Chile

- Chilean Navy

France

- French Air Force

Guinea-Bissau

- Guinea-Bissau Air Force

Ivory Coast
Jordan

- Royal Jordanian Air Force
- Jordanian Royal Flight

Lebanon

- Lebanese Air Force

Libya

- Libyan Air Force (Mirage Weapons Trainer)

Morocco

- Royal Moroccan Air Force

Norway

- Royal Norwegian Air Force
  - 717 Squadron - the remaining two planes 041 Hugin and 053 Munin were retired in September 2022, following a farewell flight over large parts of Southern Norway. Their duties will be taken over by the new F-35A and P-8 Poseidon planes being delivered to the RNoAF

Nicaragua

- Nicaraguan Air Force

Oman

- Oman Royal Flight

Panama

- Panamanian Public Forces

Peru

- Peruvian Air Force

Portugal

- Portuguese Air Force

South Africa

- South African Air Force

United States

- United States Coast Guard

== Specifications (Falcon 20F) ==
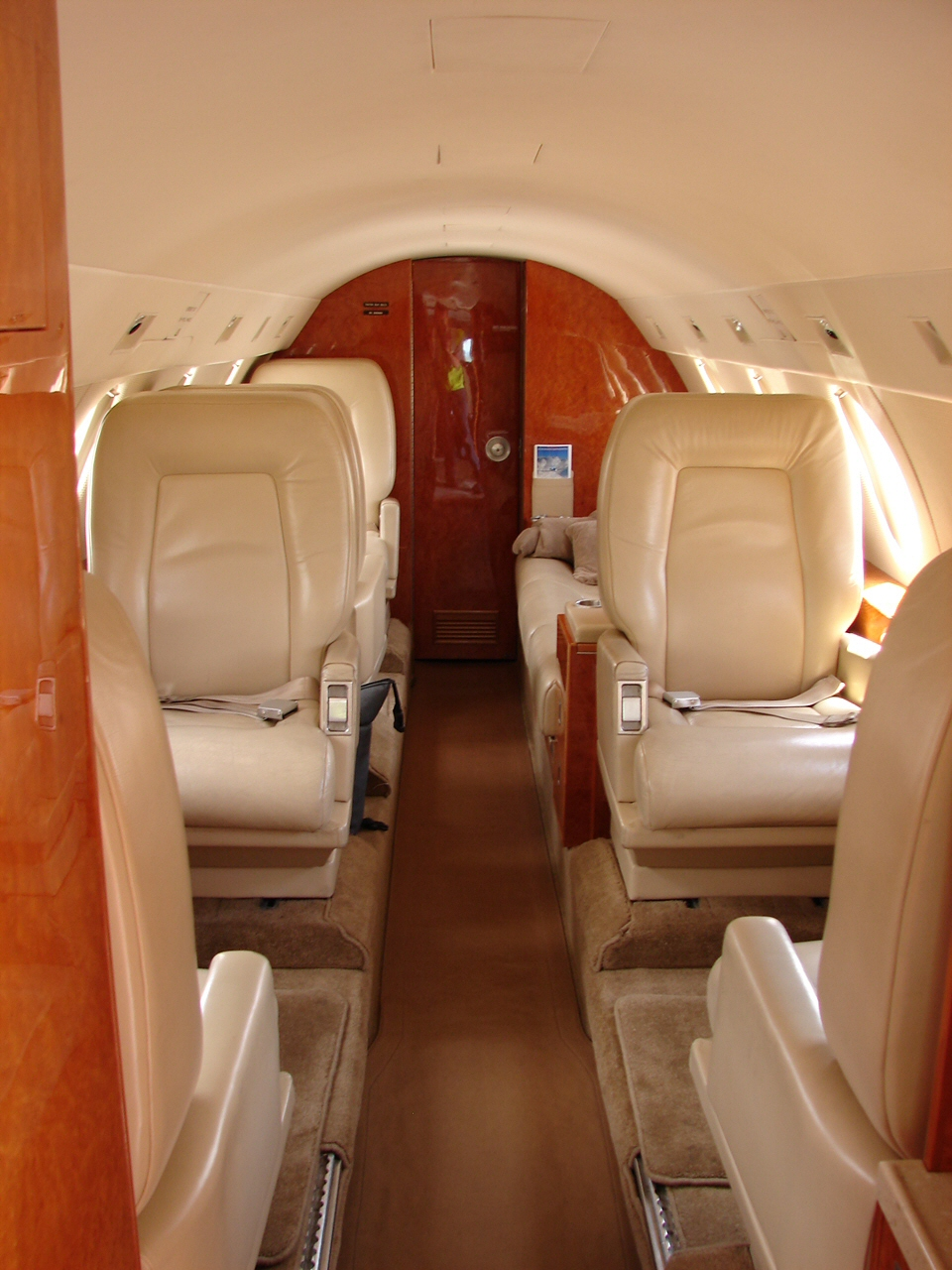
Interior of a Falcon 20

Data from Janes's All The World's Aircraft 1980–81

General characteristics

- Crew: 2
- Capacity: 8–14 passengers
- Length: 17.15 m (56 ft 3 in)
- Wingspan: 16.30 m (53 ft 6 in)
- Height: 5.32 m (17 ft 5 in)
- Wing area: 41.00 m^{2} (441.3 sq ft)
- Aspect ratio: 6.4:1
- Empty weight: 7,530 kg (16,601 lb)
- Max takeoff weight: 13,000 kg (28,660 lb)
- Fuel capacity: 5,200 L (1,100 imp gal; 1,400 US gal)
- Powerplant: 2 × General Electric CF700-2D-2 turbofans, 20 kN (4,500 lbf) thrust each

Performance

- Maximum speed: 862 km/h (536 mph, 465 kn) at 7,620 m (25,000 ft) (max cruise)
- Cruise speed: 750 km/h (470 mph, 400 kn) at 12,200 m (40,000 ft) (econ. cruise)
- Stall speed: 152 km/h (94 mph, 82 kn)
- Range: 3,350 km (2,080 mi, 1,810 nmi)
- Service ceiling: 12,800 m (42,000 ft) (absolute ceiling)

== Popular culture ==
- The Mystère 20 prototype was also featured in the 1966 comedy How to Steal a Million, starring Audrey Hepburn and Peter O'Toole.

== See also ==
Related development

- Dassault Falcon 10
- Dassault Falcon 30
- Dassault Falcon 50

Aircraft of comparable role, configuration, and era

- Raytheon Hawker 800

Related lists

- List of civil aircraft
