= Grand Aire Express =

IATA	ICAO	Call sign
-	GAE	GRAND EXPRESS
- Founded: 1985; 41 years ago
- Ceased operations: 2003; 23 years ago
- Hubs: Toledo Express Airport
- Headquarters: Swanton, Ohio, USA
- Website: https://www.grandaire.com

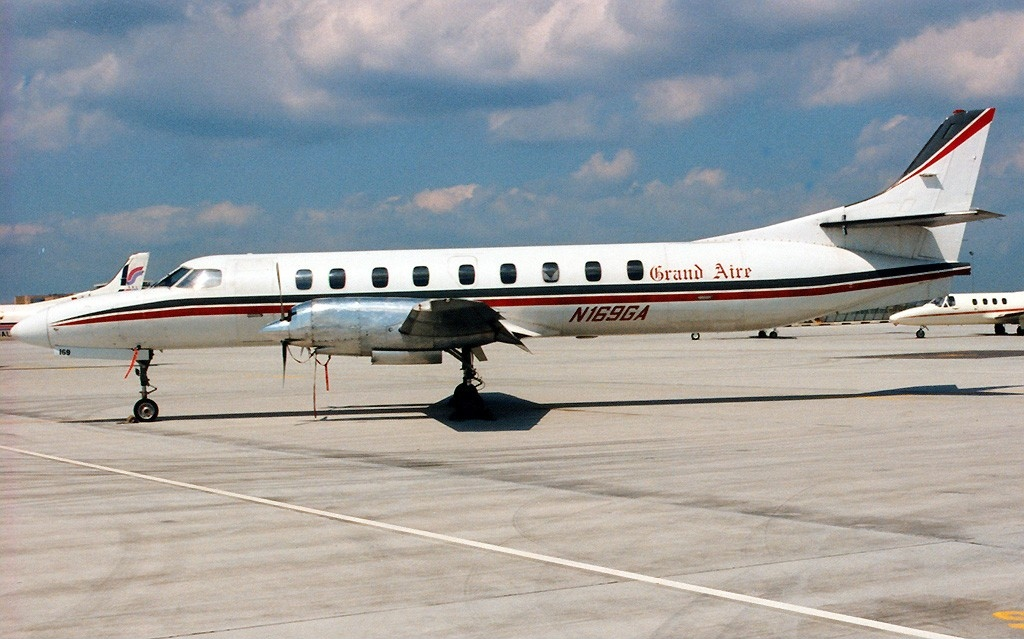
Grand Aire Express Swearingen SA-226TC Metro II

Grand Aire Express was an American airline based in Swanton, Ohio, US. It operated passenger and cargo charter services worldwide, as well as charter management services. Its main base began in Monroe, Michigan and then moved to Toledo Express Airport, Toledo, Ohio. with additional bases in Louisville, KY and El Paso, TX. Grand Aire Express closed down/disestablished in June 2003; however, the parent company Grand Aire Inc., is still in operation, providing On-Demand Air Charter and FBO services from their world-headquarters at the Toledo Express Airport in Swanton, Ohio.

== History ==
The airline was established in 1985 by Tahir Cheema. The company originally started out of Detroit Metro Airport in 1985 and quickly expanded from a one-airplane hangar operation to a larger operation in Monroe, MI. After five years based at Monroe, Michigan, Grand Aire Express moved to new corporate headquarters at Toledo Express Airport on 4 January 1999. After winning multiple awards with Air Cargo, Ernst Young Entrepreneurs, the State of Michigan Businesses and Ohio Businesses; Grand Aire Express (GAE) closed down due to the post 9/11 airline and economy fallout.

Grand Aire Incorporated, separate from Grand Aire Express, is still in business as a provider of on-demand air charter services throughout North America which includes time-critical air charters worldwide, passenger air charters, FBO services at Toledo Express Airport, and cargo handling & trucking.

== Accreditation and awards ==
- A.C.E. (Air Cargo Excellence) Award; Air Cargo World magazine
- 2005 Johnson Controls Top Logistics Vendor Award, 2007 Dell Top 100 Small Business Award
- 2008 Wells Fargo Asian-American Business Leadership Award
- 2009 Diversity Business Top 100 Small Business for Ohio
- Entrepreneurial & Business Excellence Hall of Fame
- Ernst Young Entrepreneur of the Year Award
- 5-Time Honoree of Top 500 Small Business in the U.S.

== Safety concerns and FAA oversight ==
From 1987 until early 1999 the Detroit FAA Flight Standards District Office (FSDO) held oversight responsibility for GAE while the operation was based in Monroe, Michigan. However, when GAE moved its headquarters to Toledo, Ohio (about 20 miles south) in early 1999 the Cleveland Flight Standards District Office took over surveillance of the company. Prior to the company's move to Toledo, GAE was led to believe by the FAA that the Detroit FSDO would retain oversight responsibilities of the company. After protests by the Cleveland FSDO, oversight was transferred from Detroit to Cleveland.

At the beginning of 1999 the Cleveland FSDO began a much more thorough oversight program in comparison to the Detroit FSDO. By the middle of 1999 fines associated with regulatory violations by the company totaled over $750,000. Most of the violations dealt with the mechanical airworthiness of the company's aircraft. GAE began to complain about the close scrutiny they were receiving from the Cleveland FSDO and alleged this was based on racism because GAE President, Tahir Cheema, was Pakistani. The managers and inspectors at the Cleveland FSDO denied the allegation by Cheema. Walter Moor was one of the FAA Primary Operations Inspector over GAE while the certificate was supervised by the Cleveland FSDO. Moor told Cheema the Cleveland FSDO was simply following the “handbooks and regulations, and their job was to ensure that those requirements were met". Leroy Moore was the FAA manager of the Cleveland FSDO during this time period and stated, that “in Cleveland you had to follow the regulations”.

Ken Shauman, was the former FAA Primary Maintenance Inspector over GAE while the certificate was supervised by the Cleveland FSDO. In April 2001, prior to the transfer of the certificate to the Detroit FSDO, Shauman wrote: “This is not a safe, nor compliant motivated operation. All the indicators and comparison factors, predicting a major catastrophic event in this operator’s future, are glaringly evident”.

Cheema in testimony to the NTSB after crash of N183GA stated that "the FAA told him that the certificate would remain at DTW" but once the company moved the FAA moved the certificate to Cleveland. "He said that the Cleveland FAA was totally different than the Detroit office. He said there was no communication with the FAA; however they kept getting letters of investigation from the FAA. The company had meetings with the FAA trying to work things out. He said he talked to the FSDO manager but was shuned off by her". Regarding the violations found by the Cleveland FSDO, Cheema told the NTSB that in six months the violations totaled over $750,000 and nobody would talk to the company. At that time he was traveling a lot and was not able to respond to the letters within FAA's deadline of 10 days as he was not at the company. "However, now when he is on the road other management personnel open his mail".

Mr. Cheema said at the time Mr. Shauman was the principal maintenance inspector from the Cleveland FSDO. "Following an inspection, he said he asked the PMI before he left if there were any items that he wanted to debried. He would say no, and then return to the FAA office and send a letter of investigation". Mr. Cheema said he could not recall "many operations violations during that time frame". "Since then, FAA regional personnel had told Mr. Shauman to stay away from Grand Aire."

In the same testimony Cheema said "problems were all paperwork errors". He said he went to the FAA in Washington and spoke to the FAA regional flight standards office in Chicago and "asked them to show him a white man's company that was fined like his was". Following that the certificate was moved back to Detroit and the Cleveland FSDO resigned the same week. According to Cheema, the FAA also had conducted an internal security audit on Mr. Schauman. In the same interview the NTSB asked how the Detroit office was to work with now and Cheema replied, "fair", "the company wanted communication. They did not want the FAA to just come to the company and take notes and go home without telling them anything. That was not the way to get things fixed".

By April 2001, oversight of GAE was returned to the Detroit FSDO. John Hogan was another FAA Principle Operation Inspector over GAE while the certificate was supervised by the Cleveland FSDO. When asked about his recollection of the transfer of the GAE certificate, Hogan said Cheema was not happy with the way the Cleveland FSDO was handling Grand Aire, so Cheema put pressure on the FAA using his “political clout”. Hogan did not think the certificate should have been moved back to Detroit, but he said the FAA Regional headquarters made that decision.

Efrain Arroyo was the Detroit FSDO Unit Supervisor and in his testimony to the NTSB he was asked about GAE's moved from Cleveland back to Detroit. Arroyo stated that "he had been briefed and showed a document that explained the move but said he still needed approval of the Regional Manager to release the document to the NTSB board".

N158GA: The first Grand Aire Express fatal accident.

== Incidents and accidents ==
- On 4/28/1993 aircraft N162GA, a Piper Aerostar, experienced a nose gear collapse on landing rollout. This aircraft subsequently experienced a second nose gear collapse and then crashed in a third incident (see below).
- On 8/11/1993 aircraft N161GA, a Piper Aerostar, experienced a right gear collapse while taxiing to ramp.
- On 1/6/1994 aircraft N167GA, a Fairchild Swearingen Metroliner, veered off the runway during landing. The aircraft veered to the right hitting a snowbank. There were no injuries and no damage to the airplane except one slightly curled propeller blade tip. The runway was very slick, but had not been reported to the pilot.
- On 4/14/1994 aircraft N174GA, a Dassault Falcon 20, experienced a brake failure and veered off the runway during landing rollout. Post incident inspection found a cannon plug not fully seated.
- On 3/20/1995 aircraft N163GA a Piper Aerostar overran the runway during landing and was destroyed. The pilot suffered a minor injury. The NTSB found: “The pilot’s failure to attain a proper touchdown point resulting in the aircraft overrunning the runway. Gusty weather conditions and the wet runway were also contributing factors”.
- On 4/4/1995 aircraft N162GA, a Piper Aerostar experienced a nose gear collapse during landing rollout after precautionary shutdown of right engine. The hydraulic pump is located on the right engine and no auxiliary pump is installed on the aircraft. The pilot was not injured, and the aircraft sustained damage to bottom skin and propeller blades.
- On 9/19/1995 aircraft N169GA, a Fairchild Swearingen Metroliner flew through treetops after takeoff while conducting a simulated engine failure during training. There were no injuries and the aircraft was substantially damaged. The pilots were able to return the aircraft to the departure airport. The NTSB found: “The Pilot-in-Command's inadequate supervision of the flight and failure to assure that proper airspeed, rate of climb, and clearance from trees were obtained/maintained”.
- On 1/27/1996 aircraft N162GA, a Piper Aerostar crashed after experiencing an enroute engine failure. The aircraft descended into icing conditions after the engine failure and was unable to maintain altitude due to ice accumulation. The aircraft was destroyed, and the pilot suffered serious injuries. The NTSB found: “Loss of power in the right engine for undetermined reason(s), and the accumulation of structural ice on the airplane, which resulted in an increased rate of descent and a subsequent forced landing before the pilot could reach an alternate airport. Factors relating to the accident were: the adverse weather (icing) conditions, darkness, fog, and the lack of suitable terrain in the emergency landing area”.
- On 5/8/1997 aircraft N160QS, a Piper Aerostar, experienced a nose gear collapse during landing rollout. After a right engine failure during flight, the nose wheel collapsed during the landing rollout. The aircraft sustained minor damage and there were no injuries. Post incident inspection found the right magneto seized, and this caused the engine to quit. The nosewheel was not locked over center because the right engine operates the only hydraulic pump.
- On 5/12/1998 aircraft N617GA, a Dassault Falcon 20, overran the runway during an aborted takeoff and sustained serious damage. The NTSB found the: “Probable cause(s) of this accident to be: “the pilot-in-command's inability to rotate during takeoff due to restricted movement of the elevator controls for undetermined reasons”. The aircraft was returned to service and was subsequently involved in a second accident (see below).
- On 12/10/1998 aircraft N615GA, a Fairchild Swearingen Metroliner, veered sharply off the runway during landing rollout. The aircraft departed the runway to the left coming to rest perpendicular to and off the runway.
- On 8/25/1999 aircraft N618GA, a Dassault Falcon 20, experienced a door opening during flight causing foreign object damage to the number one engine. After takeoff the cargo door opened and number one engine was “fodded” with a cargo liner. Post incident investigation found the door warning/latch system was operating properly.
- On 11/12/1999 aircraft N615GA, a Fairchild Swearingen Metroliner, skidded off the runway during landing after the left brake locked coming to rest 50 into grass. Post incident investigation found water in left brake assembly.
- On 4/4/2000 aircraft N175GA, a Dassault Falcon 20, experienced a landing gear collapse after attempting and emergency landing gear extension. The NTSB found: "The failure of the PIC to execute the complete procedure for emergency extension of the landing gear and the subsequent landing with the left main landing gear not locked fully down, resulting in an excursion off the runway and collision with a runway stanchion. A factor in the incident was the fatigue failure of the left MLG door hydraulic emergency slide valve bolts due to non-compliance with a 1984 factory service bulletin that recommended replacement with larger bolts”.
- On 6/13/2000 aircraft N184GA, a Dassault Falcon 20, was destroyed while making a third landing attempt at the Peterborough, Canada Airport. According to the Transportation Safety Board of Canada nearing the destination, the flight crew received a clearance to conduct a non-directional beacon runway 09 approach at Peterborough Airport. The flight crew did not acquire the runway environment during this approach and conducted a missed approach procedure. During a second approach, the flight crew acquired the runway environment; however, the aircraft touched down near the runway midpoint, and the captain elected to abort the landing. The captain then conducted a left visual circuit to attempt another landing. As the aircraft was turning onto the final leg, the approach became unstabilized, and struck terrain. The crew received minor injuries.
- On 8/28/2001 aircraft N617GA, a Dassault Falcon 20, sustained substantial damage upon impact with terrain and objects after traveling off the end of the runway during a main wheels up landing returning to the departure airport after the cargo door opened. Both pilots were uninjured. The NTSB determined the probable cause(s). The wheels up landing performed by the flight crew during the emergency landing and improper aircraft pre-flight by the pilot in command. Factors were the unsecured cargo door, the cemetery fence, and the lack of crew coordination during the flight.

N158GA the pilot who perished in this accident was the first of seven fatalities at Grand Aire Express.

- On 7/18/2002 aircraft N158GA, a Piper Aerostar, crashed during a missed approach killing the pilot. The airplane was destroyed by impact forces and fire after it impacted the intersection of runway 23 and 32 while attempting a missed-approach. The pilot's crew day started at 1300 and the 14 hour duty limit was 0300 the following morning, while the accident occurred at 0345. The second leg of the flight was delayed 1 hour and 36 minutes due to a freight delay. The operator reported the pilot exceeded his 14-hour crew day by 45 minutes as a result of the freight delay. Additionally, the destination did not have authorized weather reporting as required by regulations. The NTSB found the probable causes to be: “The pilot's failure to maintain control of the airplane during a missed approach. Additional factors included the operator's inadequate oversight, the pilot's improper in-flight decision, conditions conducive to pilot fatigue, fog, and night".

The charred cockpit remains of N183GA. Three pilots were killed.

- On 4/8/2003 aircraft N183GA, a Dassault Falcon 20, crashed short of the runway while conducting simulated engine out training in icing conditions. All three pilots were killed and the aircraft was destroyed. The NTSB found the probable causes to be: “The flight instructor's inadequate supervision of the flight, including his failure to maintain an approach airspeed consistent with the airplane's configuration, which resulted in an aerodynamic stall due to slow airspeed, and subsequent uncontrolled descent into trees. Factors were the icing conditions, the flight instructors failure to turn on the wing and engine anti-ice, and his lack of experience as an instructor pilot in the airplane”.
- On 4/8/2003 aircraft N179GA, a Dassault Falcon 20, ditched into the Mississippi River after running out of fuel. The two pilots were seriously injured and the aircraft was destroyed. The NTSB found: “The pilot in command's improper in-flight decision not to divert to an alternate destination resulting in the exhaustion of the airplane's fuel supply, and his failure to relay his low fuel state to air traffic control in a timely manner”.
- On 1/14/2004 aircraft N258PE, a Dassault Falcon 20, experienced a brake failure and veered off the right side of the runway during landing rollout. Postflight inspection found the #1 anti-skid generator inoperative. The FAA also found the pilot in command was occupying the right seat when the Company operations manual required the pilot in command occupy the left seat. The manufacturer's representative stated the aircraft design would have allowed the aircraft to remain on the runway with the rudder and the tiller. However, the tiller is only available to the left seat pilot. Although N258PE was registered to and operated by Tri-Coastal at time of incident, it was previously registered to and operated by Grand Aire Express as N174GA.
- On 11/30/2004 aircraft N604GA, a Hamburger Flugzeugbau HFB 320 Hansa Jet, was destroyed when it crashed into the Missouri River killing the two pilots. The captain of the flight was Tahir Cheema, chief executive officer and president of Grand Aire Express, Inc. The aircraft was being flown under a special maintenance ferry permit from Saint Louis (SUS) to Toledo (TOL). The NTSB found that maintenance performed by Midcoast Aviation (SUS) "failed to properly install and inspect the elevator trim system resulting in the reversed elevator trim condition and the pilot's failure to maintain clearance with the terrain. Contributing factors included the dark night and low ceiling”.
- On 2/8/2006 N629EK, a Fairchild Swearingen Metroliner, was destroyed when it crashed and the pilot, Abdulgader Zbedah, was killed after he had reported a fuel imbalance. The NTSB determined the probable cause to be: “the pilot's inflight loss of control following a reported fuel asymmetry condition for undetermined reasons.

== See also ==
- List of defunct airlines of the United States
