= Garrett ATF3 =

American turbofan engine

ATF3 / F104
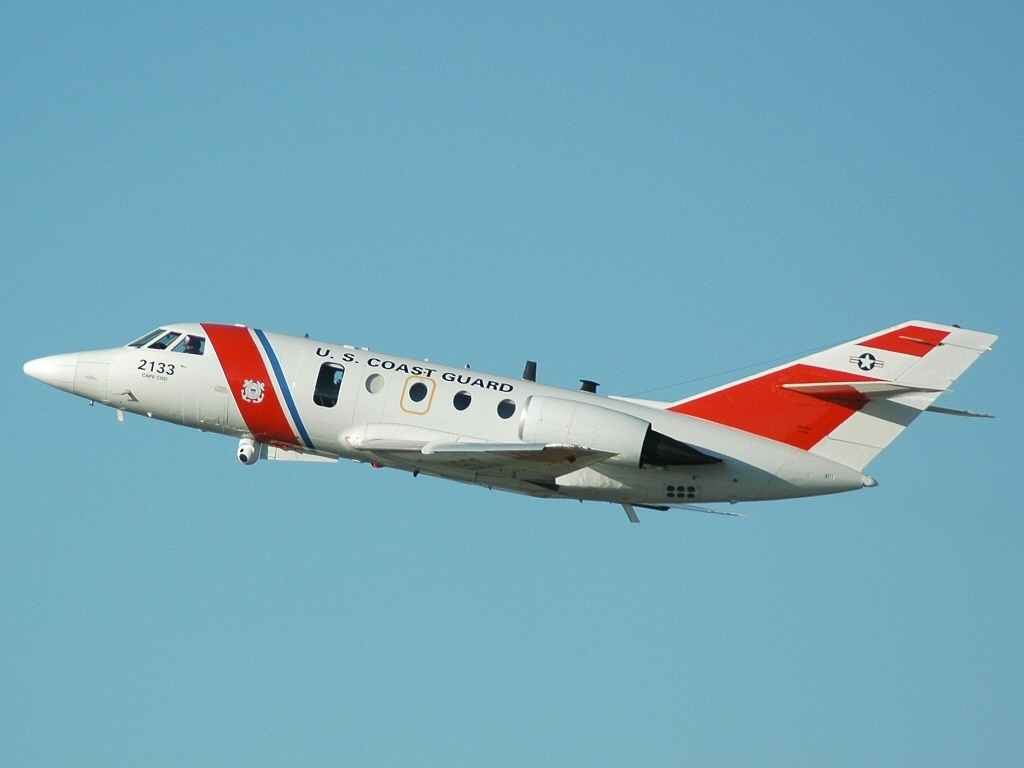
- A Dassault HU-25 Guardian, powered by two ATF3 engines
- Type: Turbofan
- National origin: United States
- Manufacturer: Garrett AiResearch; Honeywell Aerospace
- First run: May 1968
- Major applications: Dassault Falcon 20G; Dassault Falcon 200; Dassault HU-25 Guardian
- Number built: 200+

The Garrett ATF3 (US military designation F104) is a three-spool turbofan engine developed at the California division of Garrett AiResearch. Due to mergers it is currently supported by Honeywell Aerospace. The engine's design is unusual; the core flow path is reversed twice. Aft of the fan, the axial compressor has five stages, after which the gas path progresses to the aft end of the engine. There, it is reversed to flow through a centrifugal compressor stage, the combustors and then the turbine stages. Beyond this, the flow is then reversed again to exit through the fan bypass duct. All engine accessories are mounted on the aft end of the engine under a tail cone.

== Design and development ==
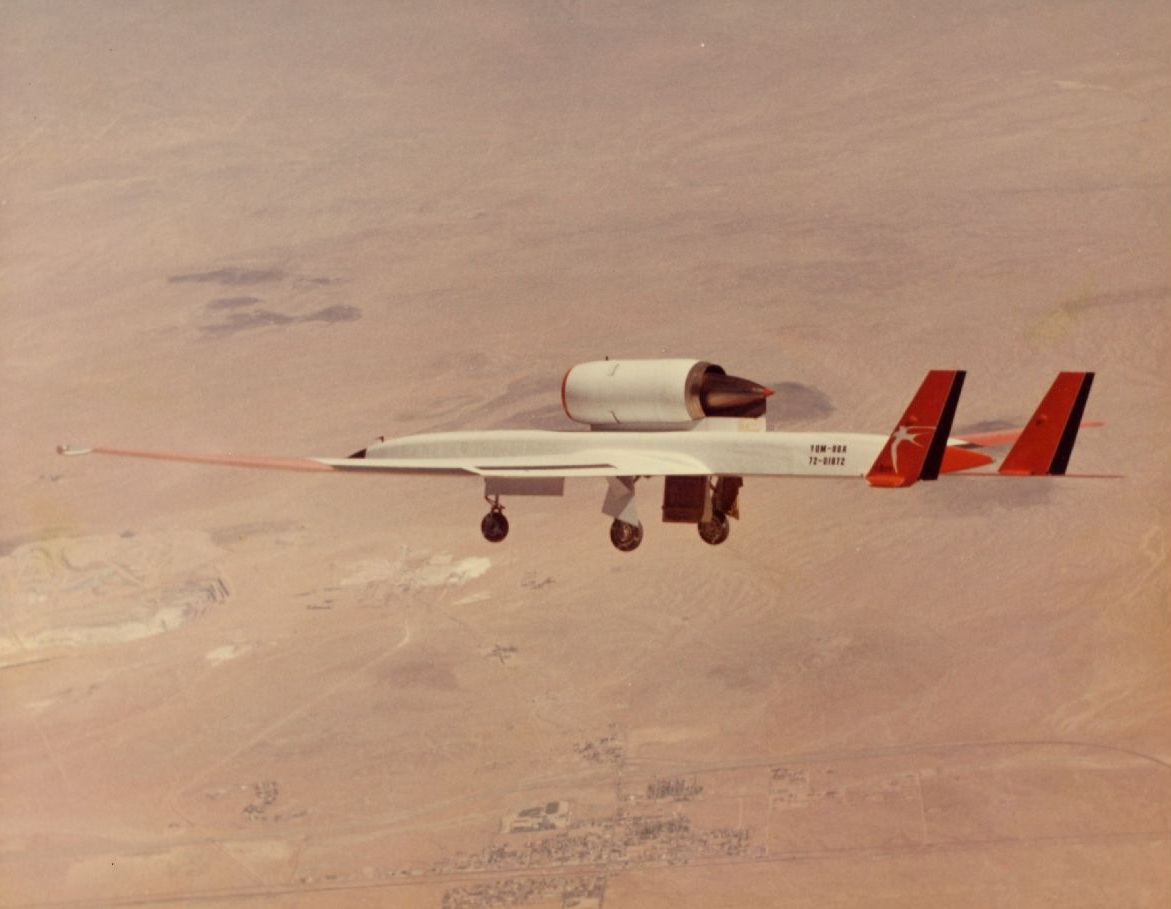
YQM-98 Compass Cope R

The ATF3 was first flown in the Teledyne Ryan YQM-98 Compass Cope R high-altitude UAV, as the YF104-GA-100. The engine proved to have a very low infrared signature, as the hot turbine was not externally visible and the core exhaust mixed with the bypass air before exiting the engine. The pilots of U-2 high-altitude chase planes reported being unable pick up the YQM-98A with either radar or IR sensors. It was later used in the Northrop Tacit Blue stealth demonstrator because of these characteristics.

The most significant application of the engine was on the Dassault HU-25 Guardian, developed for the US Coast Guard. It was also used on the Dassault Falcon 20G and Dassault Falcon 200.

The ATF3 was "selected by North American Rockwell for its new Series 60 Sabreliner business jet. . . . [H]owever, the ATF3 developed engineering and production problems. Delivery schedules were not met. North American Rockwell brought a $60 million suit against Garrett. . . . The suit was settled out of court for less than $5 million cash. The engine was ultimately selected for a version of the Dassault Falcon ordered by the U.S. Coast Guard for offshore surveillance."

== Applications ==
- Dassault Falcon 20G
- Dassault Falcon 200
- Dassault HU-25 Guardian
- Northrop Tacit Blue
- Ryan YQM-98 R-Tern (Compass Cope R)

== Specifications (ATF3/F104-GA-100) ==
Data from Jane's All the World's Aircraft 1988–89

==== General characteristics ====
- Type: Three-shaft axial-flow turbofan
- Length: 102.0 in (2,591 mm)
- Diameter: 33.6 in (853 mm)
- Dry weight: 1,125 lb (510 kg)

==== Components ====
- Compressor: Single-stage low-pressure fan, five-stage intermediate-pressure axial compressor and single-stage high-pressure centrifugal compressor
- Combustors: Reverse-flow annular type
- Turbine: Three-stage: single-stage high-pressure, three-stage intermediate-pressure and two-stage low-pressure

==== Performance ====
- Maximum thrust: 5,440 lbf (24.20 kN) take-off, 1,055 lbf (4.69 kN) cruise
- Overall pressure ratio: 21
- Bypass ratio: 2.8
- Air mass flow: 162 lb/s (73.5 kg/s) at take-off

== See also ==
Related lists

- List of aircraft engines
