= Optical Bar Camera =

An optical bar camera is a type of long-focal-length panoramic camera used for panoramic images; e.g., for high-altitude or satellite reconnaissance.

== Itek KA-80 ==
Itek KA-80/A developed for the Teledyne Ryan AQM-91 Firefly, then also used in A-12, Lockheed U-2 and SR-71 reconnaissance aircraft.

== Apollo Panoramic Camera ==
Itek KA-80A derivative with 24-inch focal length used in Apollo program to map parts of the moon. Used on Apollo 15–17.

== Perkin-Elmer KH-9 OBC ==
See Optical Bar Cameras

== See also ==
- DB-110
