= RAPTOR =

Reconnaissance pod

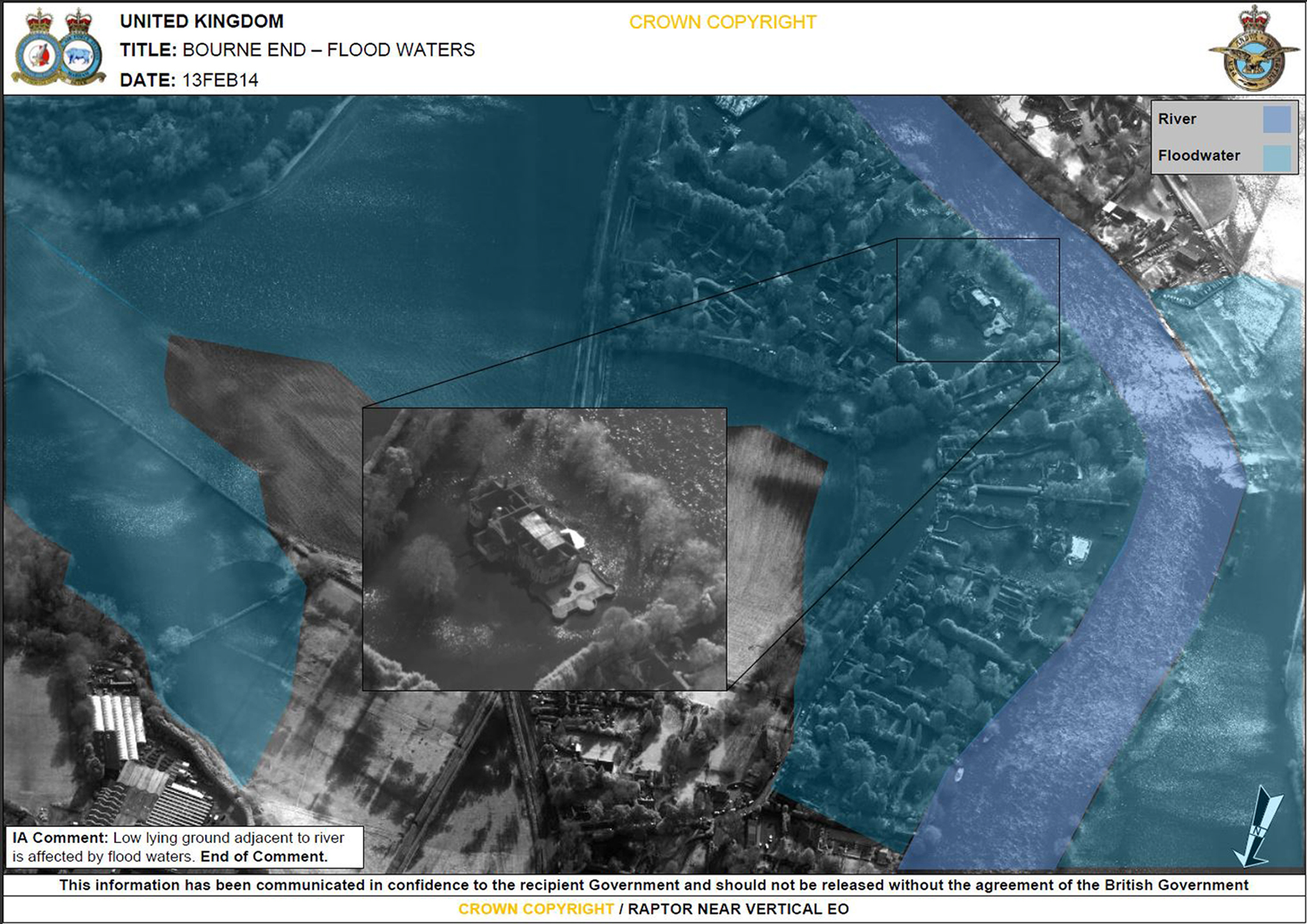
An image taken by a RAPTOR pod of flooding in the United Kingdom during 2014

RAPTOR (Reconnaissance Airborne Pod Tornado) was a reconnaissance pod used by the Royal Air Force on its fleet of Tornado GR.4A and GR.4 aircraft. RAPTOR was manufactured by the Goodrich Corporation, initially part of UTC Aerospace Systems, but now part of Collins Aerospace.

The RAPTOR contained a DB-110 reconnaissance sensor, an imagery data recording system and an air-to-ground data link system. The sensor is electro-optical and infrared, allowing day or night missions. The data link allows imagery to be exploited almost instantly.

== DB-110 ==
DB-110 ('dual-band 110-inch focal length') was developed as an exportable derivative of the U-2's Senior Year Electro-Optical Reconnaissance System (SYERS-2). It represents a shift for airborne tactical reconnaissance systems from visible light, daylight-only film-based systems to dual-band day and night digital imaging with real-time downlinking. The DB-110 remains the only comparable LOROP (Long-Range Oblique Photography) pod to have been demonstrated in use on tactical aircraft.

DB-110 installations, such as RAPTOR, also include a reconnaissance mission planning system (RMPS). Planned missions produce route cards for a pilot's kneeboard, are downloaded to route planning systems on either the recon aircraft or AWACS aircraft and are placed on a PCMCIA card that is used to load the pod itself with sensor tasking information.

== RAF use ==
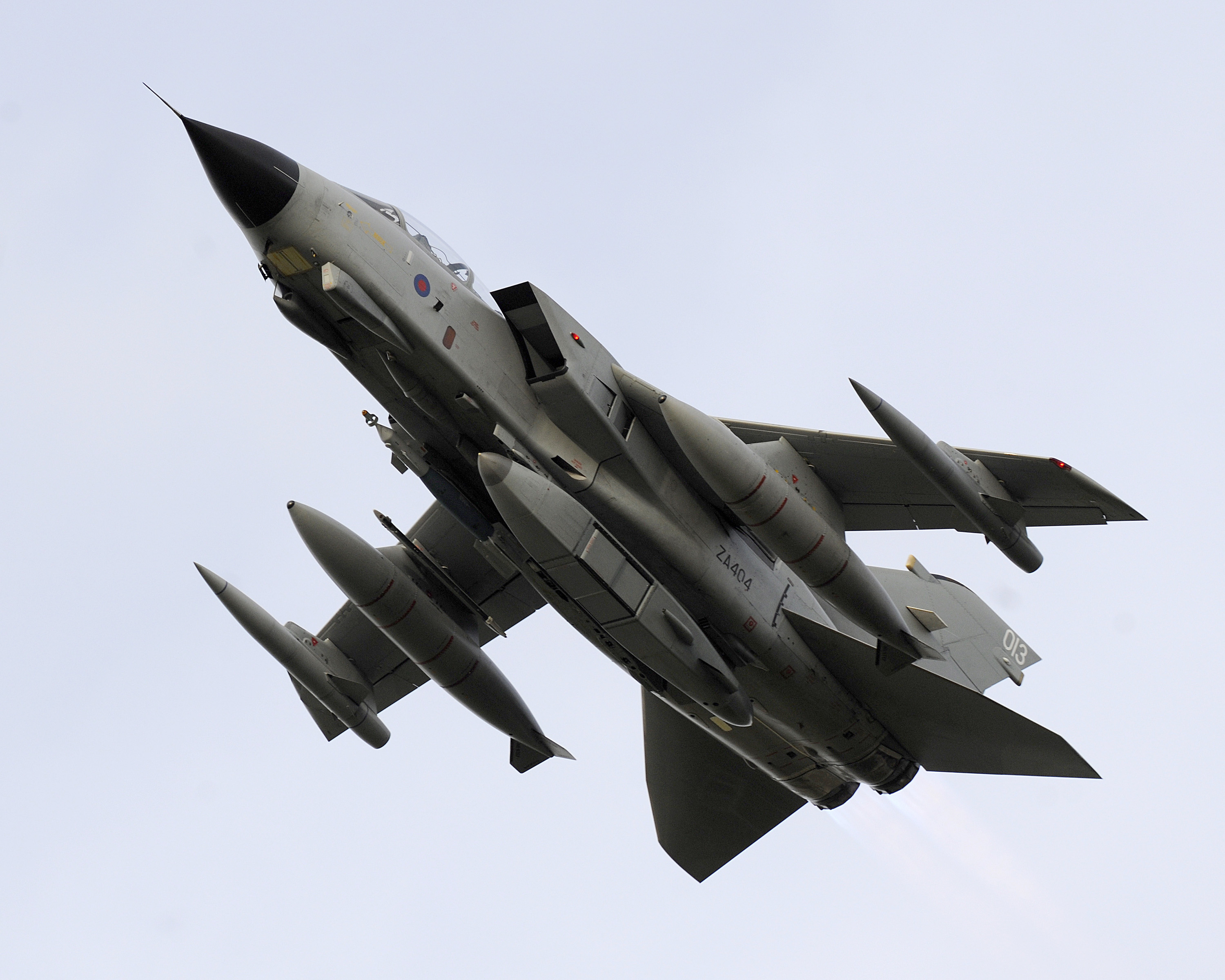
An RAF GR4 equipped with a RAPTOR pod beneath its fuselage in 2007

No. II (AC) Sqn and 13 Sqn were the RAF's two specialist Tornado reconnaissance units, but with the RAPTOR pod any GR4 squadron could undertake reconnaissance missions. The RAF procured eight RAPTOR units and two ground stations. RAPTOR achieved its operational debut during Operation Telic, the UK contribution to the 2003 Iraq War.

== Other users ==
RAPTOR was also used on Japanese OP-3C maritime reconnaissance aircraft. DB-110 pods have also been supplied for Polish F-16s in 2006, Pakistani F-16s in 2009 and Turkish F-16s in 2013. Saudi Arabia in 2012 became the tenth country to use the DB-110 and the first for F-15 carriage.

== See also ==
- Optical Bar Camera
- Itek KA-80
