= General Electric J97 =

J97
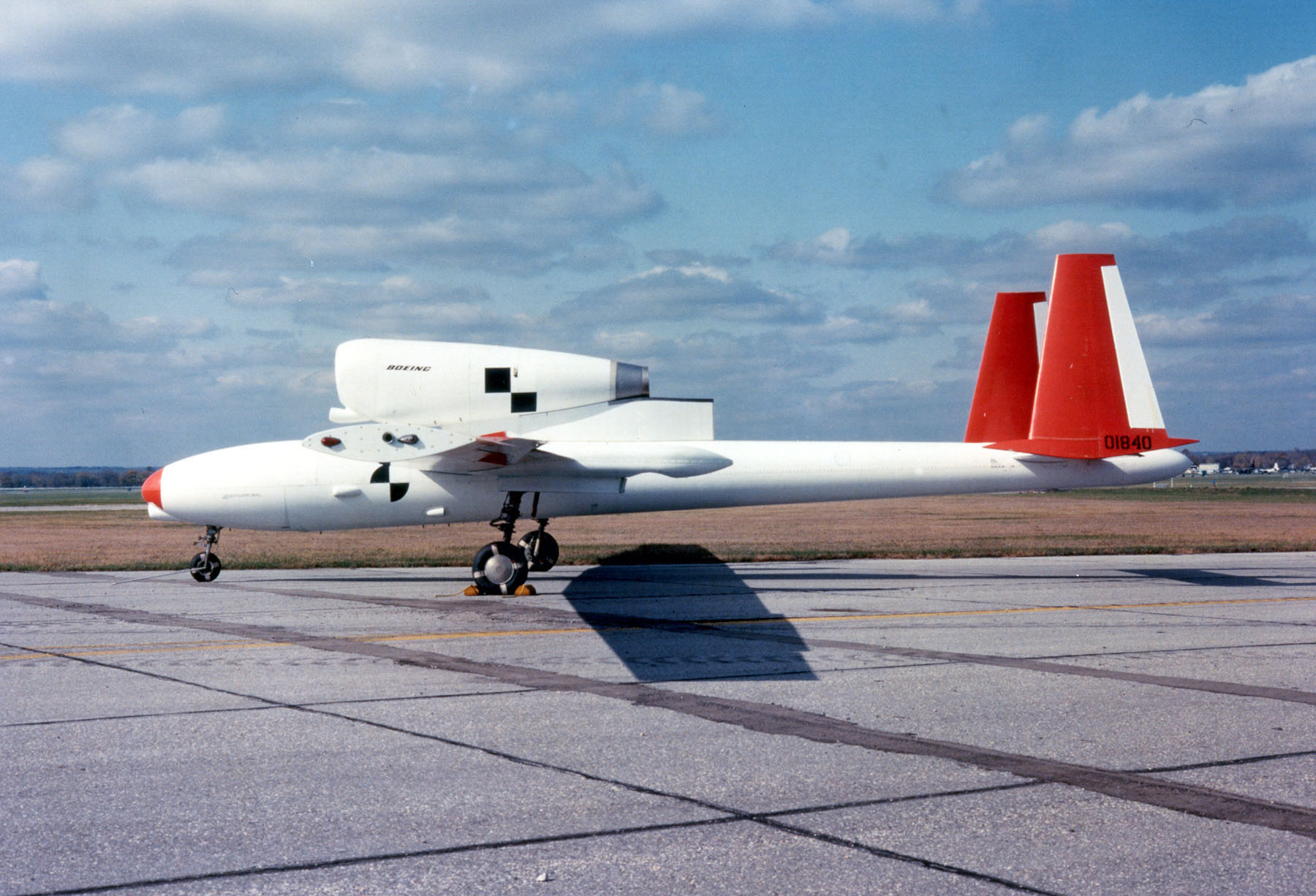
- Boeing YQM-94 B-Gull, with the J97 on top of the fuselage
- Type: Turbojet
- National origin: United States
- Manufacturer: General Electric
- First run: 1960s
- Major applications: Boeing YQM-94 B-Gull; Ryan AQM-91 Firefly
- Developed from: General Electric GE1

The General Electric J97 is a single-shaft turbojet engine designed and built by General Electric as a compact high-performance engine for light attack fighters and eventually a number of drone projects.

== Development and design ==
The J97 was based on GE's General Electric GE1/J1 series of turbojets and the engine development was financed by the United States Air Force. The original application was to be the Northrop P-530 (which later evolved into the YF-17), but it was ultimately only used in several small drone aircraft.

== Variants ==
J97-GE-100

- Standard Variant

J97-GE-17

- Variant of the engine with 11,760 lbf (52,300 N) of thrust proposed for use in the Super Dynamics O4-1B Robin supersonic business jet.

== Applications ==
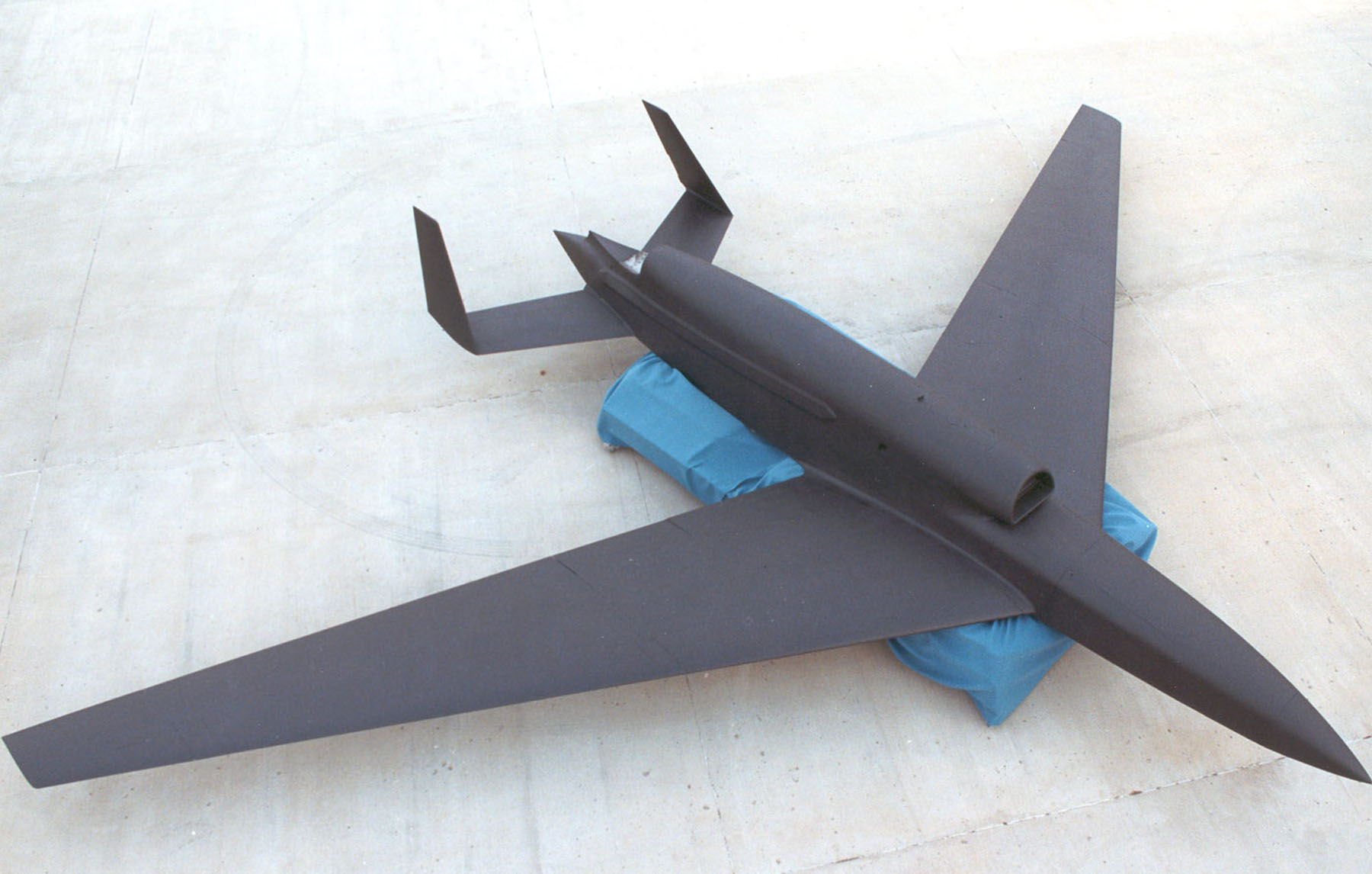
Ryan AQM-91 Firefly

- Boeing YQM-94 B-Gull (Compass Cope B)
- Ryan AQM-91 Firefly

== Specifications (J97-GE-100) ==
Data from

==== General characteristics ====
- Type: Turbojet engine
- Length: 109.5in (2.78m)
- Diameter: 24.4in (0.62m)
- Dry weight: 694lb (315kg)

==== Components ====
- Compressor: 14-stage
- Combustors: annular
- Turbine: two-stage

==== Performance ====
- Maximum thrust: Take-off 5,270lb (23.4kN) dry, 8,000lbf (35kN) afterburner
- Thrust-to-weight ratio: 11.5

== See also ==
Related lists

- List of aircraft engines
