= Ryan AQM-91 Firefly =

US Vietnam-era reconnaissance drone

AQM-91 Firefly
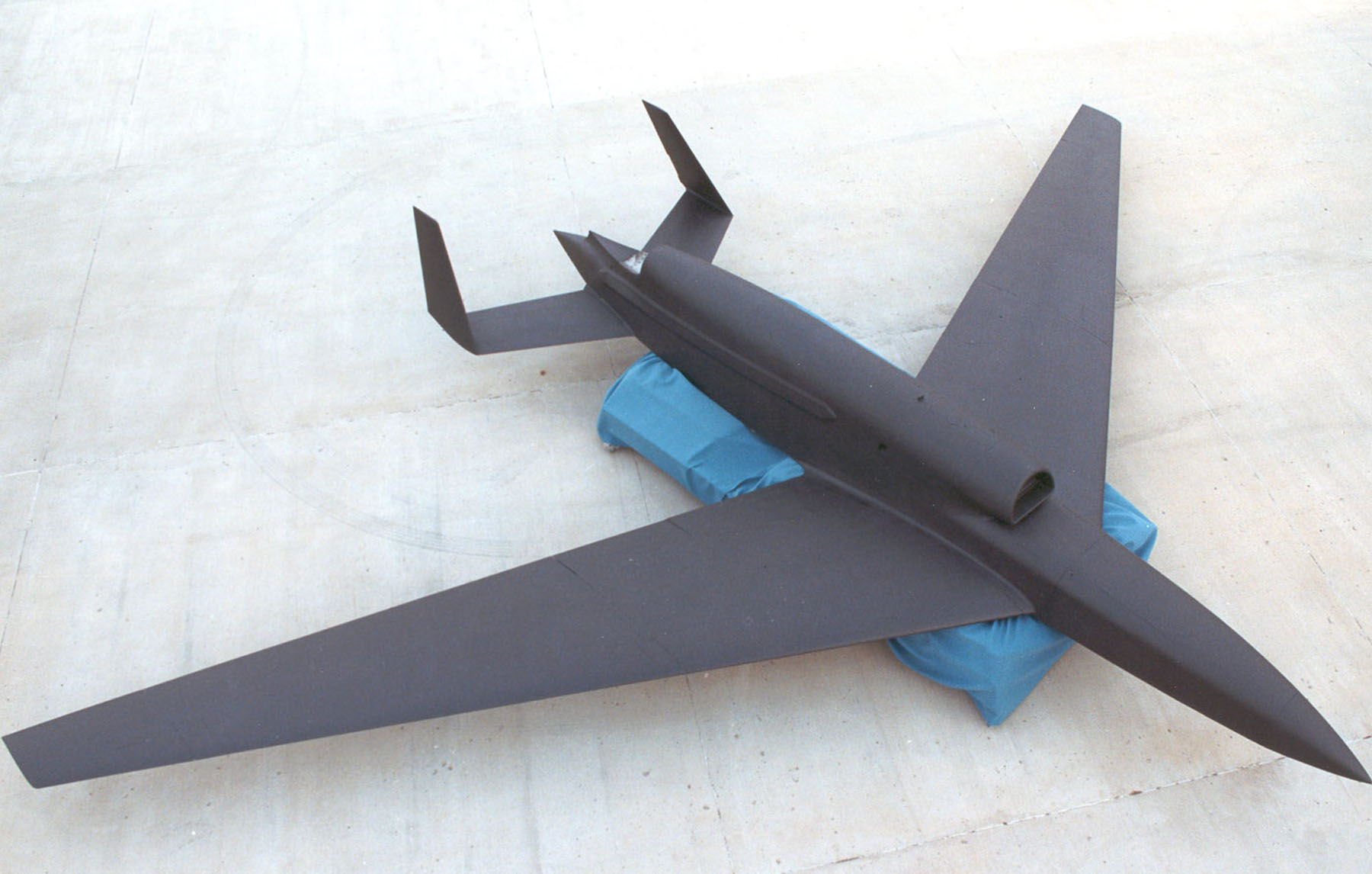
- Teledyne Ryan AQM-91A Compass Arrow at the National Museum of the United States Air Force.

General information
- Type: Aerial reconnaissance unmanned aerial vehicle
- National origin: United States
- Manufacturer: Ryan Aeronautical
- Number built: 28

History
- First flight: September 1968

The Ryan AQM-91 Firefly was a developmental drone developed during the Vietnam War to perform long-range reconnaissance, especially into China.

== Development ==
The Ryan Model 147 Lightning Bug reconnaissance drone was used successfully in southeast Asia during the 1960s, but it lacked the range to fly deep into China and back out again. In particular, the Chinese nuclear development facility at Lop Nor was far out of reach of the Lightning Bugs, and was barely within reach of the Lockheed U-2 spyplane, both of which had become far too vulnerable to SAMs. US intelligence thus needed a long-range drone with a high degree of survivability. Such requirements spelled out a completely new design, not a modification of a target drone.

Ryan pursued advanced drone concepts on a part-time basis. After discussions with the CIA that went nowhere, Ryan pitched their advanced reconnaissance drone concepts to the Air Force in early 1966. The USAF was interested, and opened up a design competition, with Ryan competing with North American Aviation. Before the contract was awarded, National Reconnaissance Office director Alexander H. Flax fought with the USAF's Air Force Systems Command for control over the contract on part of the NRO and Big Safari, with the USAF winning this debacle and awarding Ryan Aeronautical the contract for 100 production models in June 1966, the new design designated the "Model 154 / AQM-91A Firefly". The basic design concept resembled that of the Model 136 Red Wagon drone that Ryan had proposed earlier in the decade, but which had been turned down in favor of a modified Firebees. The name "Firefly" was resurrected from the early Model 147 program for the new drone, though it was also referred to as "Compass Arrow" after the program name.

Still however, a year after the contract had been awarded the NRO cut the number of production models from 100 to 20.

The test flights were conducted over the US Southwest. The project was highly secret, but on 4 August 1969 one of the prototypes failed and parachuted to ground inside the Los Alamos nuclear research complex during lunch hour. Unfortunately, it didn't land in a restricted area, and local newspeople were able to take and publish photographs of the aircraft. The Air Force released a statement that the aircraft was a "high altitude target".

Test flights were halted for a few weeks while procedures were reviewed. Flights were resumed, culminating in long-range evaluations in late 1971. Testing concluded with the Model 154 exceeding its altitude requirements and proving almost invisible to radar. However, by this time the need for the Model 154 had vanished. In July 1971, President Richard Nixon began a diplomatic effort to build ties with China, and reconnaissance overflights were cancelled. Satellite reconnaissance capabilities had improved through the 1960s, leading to the first launch of the advanced KH-9 Hexagon satellite on 15 June 1971, which provided strategic intelligence without diplomatic consequences.

The Model 154 program lingered on for a few more years, but in 1973 all were put in mothballs, and scrapped a few years after that. Twenty-eight had been built, including 20 production models. It had taken 5 years to build the 20 production models, at the time costing $250 million.

According to project manager Robert Schwanhausser, Israel sought to acquire these shelved drones prior to the Yom Kippur War, to which according to one of the engineers of the program John Dale added that Richard Nixon ordered personally for these drones to be destroyed as to prevent them in Israeli hands.

== Design ==
An AQM-91 under the wing of a DC-130

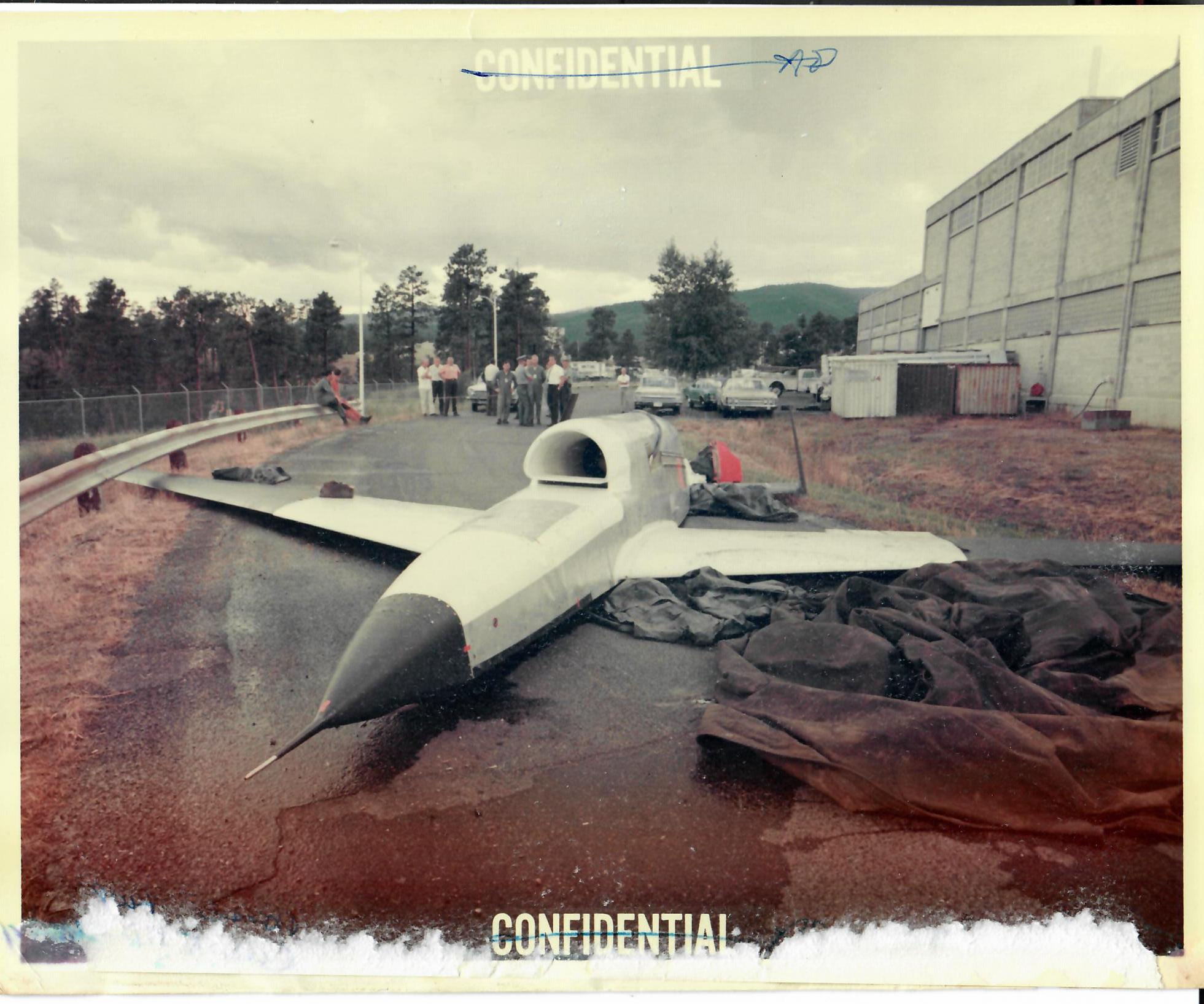
The project was highly secret, but on 4 August 1969 one of the prototypes failed and parachuted to ground inside the Los Alamos nuclear research complex during lunch hour.

=== Stealth ===
The Model 154 had an engine on the top of the fuselage to reduce its radar cross-section and infrared signature as seen from below, as well as twin inward-canted tailfins to conceal the exhaust stream. It had a fuselage with flat bottom. A ground radar would need to be directly below the drone to detect it, but by the time it is detected, the aircraft is travelling away, which makes tracking difficult. The sides of the fuselage are sloped flat to deflect radar signals. It was built using a high percentage of plastic composite materials, which had a lower radar reflectivity than metal. The leading and trailing edges of the wings had inset triangles of a radar-absorbent material. The aircraft was powered by a General Electric YJ97-GE-3 turbojet providing 4,000 pounds (1,815 kg) thrust, with the engine exhaust mixed with cool air to reduce its infrared signature. The YJ97 was derived from a General Electric demonstrator engine designated the "GE1".

=== Avionics ===
The Model 154 was launched by a DC-130 Hercules director aircraft, and recovered in midair by helicopter. It had a precision-navigation autopilot system, a reconnaissance payload, a self-destruct system to ensure that none of its sensitive gear fell into enemy hands, and was to carry electronic countermeasures to further improve its survivability. The primary reconnaissance payload was an Itek KA-80A Optical Bar Camera, but in principle it could also carry thermographic camera or a SIGINT payload.

The guidance system was designed to provide navigation accuracies with an error of no more than half a percent. The guidance system proved to be very tricky, and first powered flight of a Model 154 did not take place until September 1968.

== Specifications ==
General characteristics

- Crew: None
- Length: 34 ft 2 in (10.40 m)
- Wingspan: 47 ft 8 in (14.50 m)
- Empty weight: 3,800 lb (1,725 kg)
- Gross weight: 5,400 lb (2,450 kg)
- Powerplant: 1 × General Electric YJ97-GE-3 , 4,000 lbf (18 kN) thrust

Performance

- Maximum speed: 505 mph (815 km/h, 439 kn)
- Range: 2,001 mi (3,220 km, 1,739 nmi)
- Service ceiling: 78,740 ft (24,000 m)

== See also ==
Related development

- Ryan YQM-98

Aircraft of comparable role, configuration, and era

- Lockheed D-21
