= First Air Flight 6560 =

2011 aircraft accident in Canada

- Wreckage of the aircraft

Accident
- Date: 20 August 2011
- Summary: Pilot error combined with inaccurate compass readings, leading to controlled flight into terrain
- Site: 1 NM (1.9 km; 1.2 mi) east of Resolute Bay Airport, Resolute, Nunavut, Canada; 74°42′57.3″N 094°55′04.0″W

Aircraft
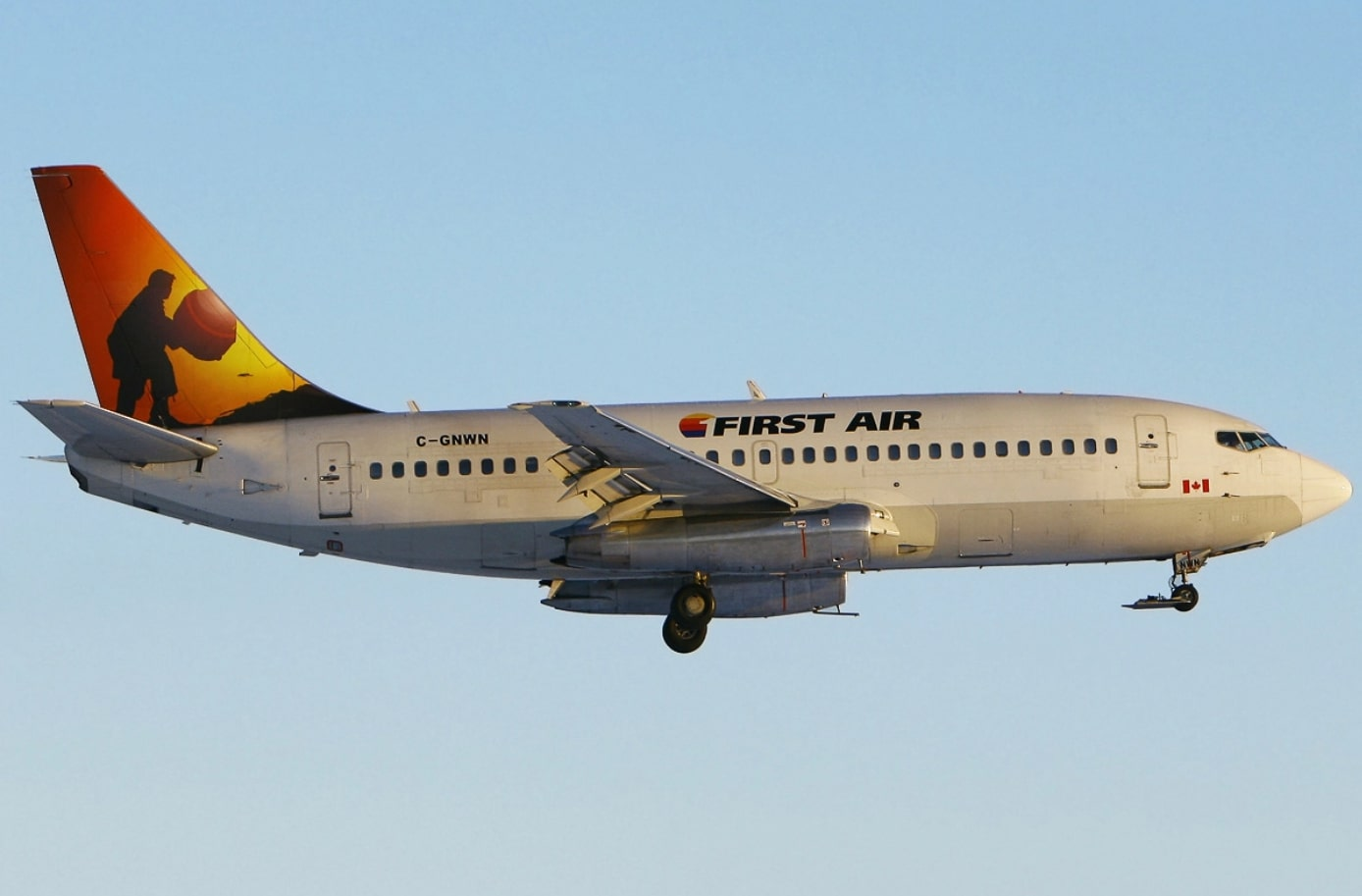
- C-GNWN, the aircraft involved in the accident, seen in February 2011
- Aircraft type: Boeing 737-210C
- Operator: First Air
- IATA flight No.: 7F6560
- ICAO flight No.: FAB6560
- Call sign: FIRST AIR 6560
- Registration: C-GNWN
- Flight origin: Yellowknife Airport, Yellowknife, Northwest Territories, Canada
- Destination: Resolute Bay Airport, Resolute, Nunavut, Canada
- Occupants: 15
- Passengers: 11
- Crew: 4
- Fatalities: 12
- Injuries: 3
- Survivors: 3

First Air Flight 6560 was a domestic charter flight that crashed on landing at Resolute, Nunavut, Canada, on 20 August 2011. Of the fifteen people on board, twelve were killed and the remaining three were severely injured. The Boeing 737-200 of First Air was operating a service from Yellowknife, Northwest Territories, when it struck a hill obscured by clouds near Resolute Bay Airport.

The subsequent investigation found that a late initiation of the descent, the inadvertent partial disengagement of the autopilot during final approach, a drift in the aircraft compass system and poor communication between the flight crew resulted in the aircraft drifting significantly off course from the final approach path, descending into the ground moments after the crew initiated a go-around.

== Accident ==
Flight 6560 had departed from Yellowknife Airport at 09:40 Central Daylight Time (14:40 Coordinated Universal Time (UTC)) on 20 August for a flight to Resolute Bay Airport carrying eleven passengers, four crew members, and freight. Captain Blair Rutherford was designated as pilot flying for the segment, and First Officer David Hare as the pilot monitoring. The flight was to be conducted in accordance with instrument flight rules. Reports received shortly after take-off indicated deteriorating weather at Resolute, but the crew agreed that the flight should not divert.

After an uneventful flight and initial descent, at 11:38 the aircraft made its final turn to line up with Resolute Airport's runway 35 (see runway naming), and the crew reported to be 10 nautical miles (19 km; 12 mi) away from it. While descending in cloud, however, instead of following the localizer signal along the runway's track, the aircraft settled on a track roughly parallel and to the east of the runway centreline.

At 11:41, as the crew initiated a go-around, Flight 6560 collided with terrain abeam the runway approximately 1 NM (1.9 km; 1.2 mi) to the east, breaking up into three main sections. An intense post-crash fire consumed most of the centre section.

Both pilots, two flight attendants and eight passengers were killed in the impact. Three passengers survived with severe injuries. Rescue operations were carried out by Canadian Armed Forces temporarily stationed at Resolute as part of the 2011 Operation Nanook military exercise, which coincidentally used a simulated remote aircraft crashing as one of two main training scenarios.

== Aircraft ==
The aircraft involved was a combi (or combined passenger-cargo) Boeing 737-210C with registration C-GNWN. It was manufactured in 1975 with serial number 21067/414.

C-GNWN was fitted with a gravel kit to enable operations from unpaved runways, such as the one at Resolute Bay Airport. No significant problems with the aircraft maintenance records were found during the investigation.

== Investigation ==
The accident was investigated by the Transportation Safety Board of Canada (TSB). In January 2012, the TSB issued an investigation update classifying the accident as a controlled flight into terrain (CFIT). It stated that the go-around manoeuvre was initiated two seconds before impact.

At that time, the crew had completed the landing checklist, the flaps were at 40, the aircraft was travelling at 157 knots (291 km/h; 181 mph) and the landing gear was down and locked. Both engines were in operation and producing power. The aircraft had been following an instrument landing system (ILS) approach due to poor visibility. Post-crash investigation found the airport's ILS system to be operating normally, and was in fact used by another aircraft that successfully landed 20 minutes after the crash of Flight 6560.

In March 2014, the TSB issued the final accident report. It found that the crew's decision to initiate the descent from cruise altitude was late, and it resulted in a significantly increased workload that affected the crew's subsequent performance and ability to properly track all parameters.

The approach was entirely flown on autopilot, which was correctly set to capture the localizer signal and track along the runway centreline (VOR/LOC capture mode). However, an inadvertent movement of the control column by the captain during the turn onto the final approach track caused the autopilot to disengage from VOR/LOC mode and revert to only maintaining the current heading, resulting in the aircraft drifting out to the right (east) of the runway centreline.

The deviation was correctly shown on the onboard localizer indicator. However, for undetermined reasons, the compass system had been incorrectly set during initial descent so that it displayed a heading that was 8° to the left of the actual heading. Furthermore, the pilot did not recalibrate the compass after the initial descent, 15 minutes before the accident, though regular recalibration when so near the north magnetic pole is necessary; the magnetic influence further increased the initial mis-calibration to 17°, giving the captain the wrong impression that the aircraft was tracking towards regaining the runway centreline.

In fact the aircraft was flying roughly parallel to the runway, and a wind from the southwest was pushing it even further to the east. Under a significantly increased workload, neither pilot noticed the partial disengagement of the autopilot. First officer Hare was aware that the aircraft was off course to the right and heading for the hill east of the airport. He tried to warn Captain Rutherford 18 times, using multiple different variations of phrasing, but failed to find a way to convey the urgency of the situation and make the captain change his course of action. After the ground proximity warning system (GPWS) issued a 'sink rate' warning, Rutherford finally commanded a go-around, but there was insufficient distance from terrain to avoid the collision.

The TSB highlighted how according to First Air's own standard operation procedures, the approach was clearly unstable and should have been aborted at an early stage. The board stressed the risks posed by unstable approaches that are continued to a landing, and called for airlines and authorities to enforce standard operating procedures and crew resource management best practices, to help crews manage workload and communicate effectively in order to make better decisions.

== Dramatization ==
The crash of First Air Flight 6560 was dramatized in "Death in the Arctic", a season 14 (2015) episode of the internationally syndicated Canadian TV documentary series Mayday.
