= Kimmirut Airport =

Airport in Nunavut, Canada

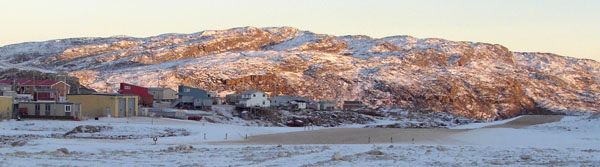
- IATA: YLC; ICAO: CYLC

Summary
- Airport type: Public
- Operator: Government of Nunavut
- Location: Kimmirut
- Time zone: EST (UTC−05:00)
  - Summer (DST): EDT (UTC−04:00)
- Elevation AMSL: 169 ft / 52 m
- Coordinates: 62°50′53″N 069°52′38″W

Map
- Location in Nunavut CYLC (Canada)

Runways
Direction	Length		Surface
Direction	ft	m	Surface
15/33	1,899	579	Gravel

Statistics (2010)
- Aircraft movements: 634
- Source: Canada Flight Supplement; Movements from Statistics Canada.

Kimmirut Airport (IATA: YLC, ICAO: CYLC) is located at Kimmirut, Nunavut, Canada, and is operated by the Government of Nunavut. Unlike most airports in Nunavut, it uses magnetic headings for the runway rather than true headings.

At 1,899 ft (579 m) the Kimmirut airstrip is the second shortest in Nunavut. Formerly Arctic Bay Airport at 1,500 ft (457 m) was the shortest, but in 2010 the runway was extended to 3,935 ft (1,199 m).

The runway at Grise Fiord Airport is just slightly shorter than Kimmirut at 1,675 ft (511 m). The length of the runway and challenging terrain at both Kimmirut and Grise Fiord limit the type of aircraft that can service those communities. Currently, both are served by airlines operating Twin Otter aircraft.

The old terminal building was constructed more than 20 years ago and replaced by a new terminal building with larger waiting area, new luggage pickup area and display for local art. Cost is split nearly evenly between Government of Nunavut and Government of Canada through the National Trade Corridors Fund. The new terminal opened on March 17, 2025.

== Airlines and destinations ==
Airlines	Destinations
Canadian North	Iqaluit

Kimmirut Airport
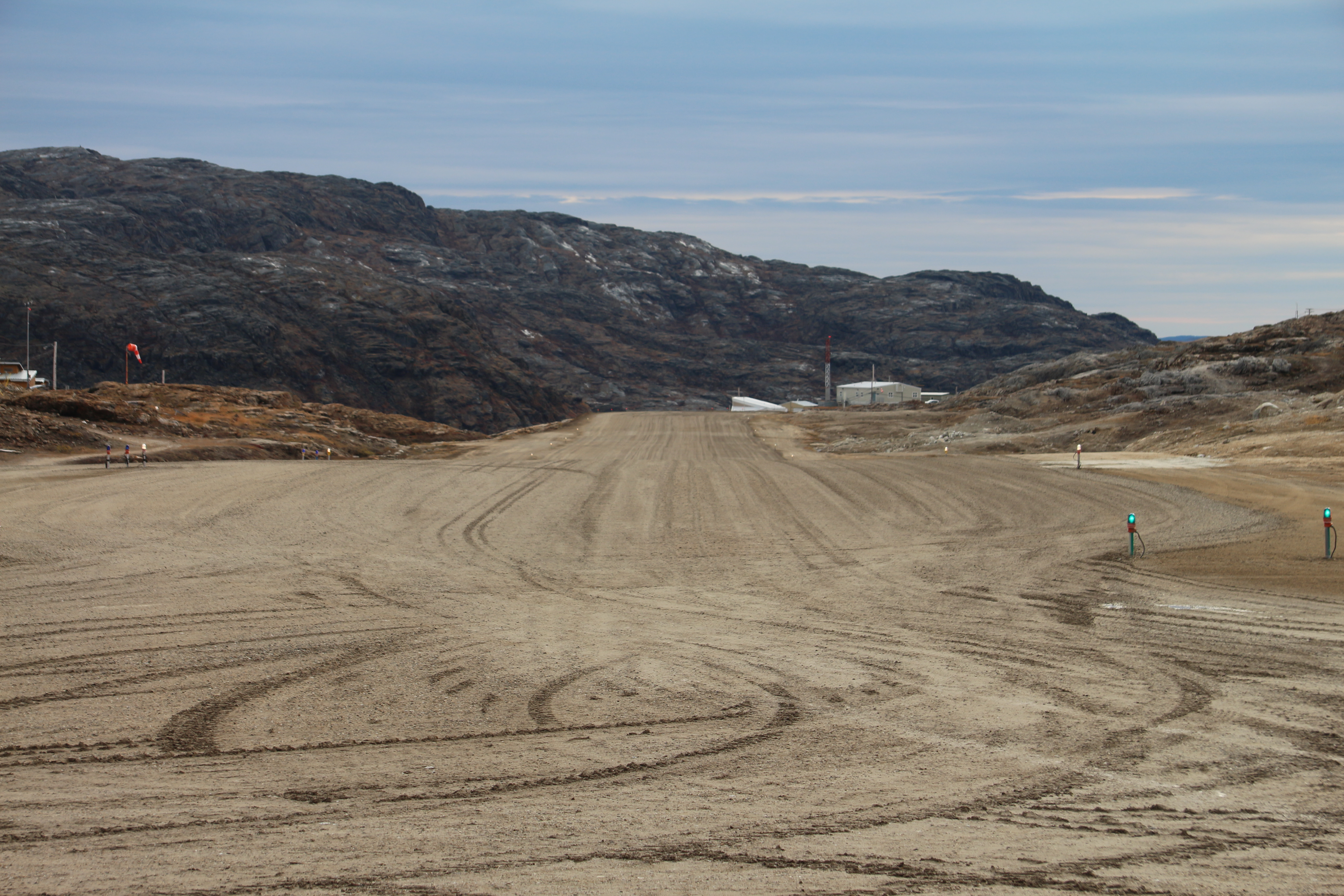
Threshold of runway 16 (now 15)

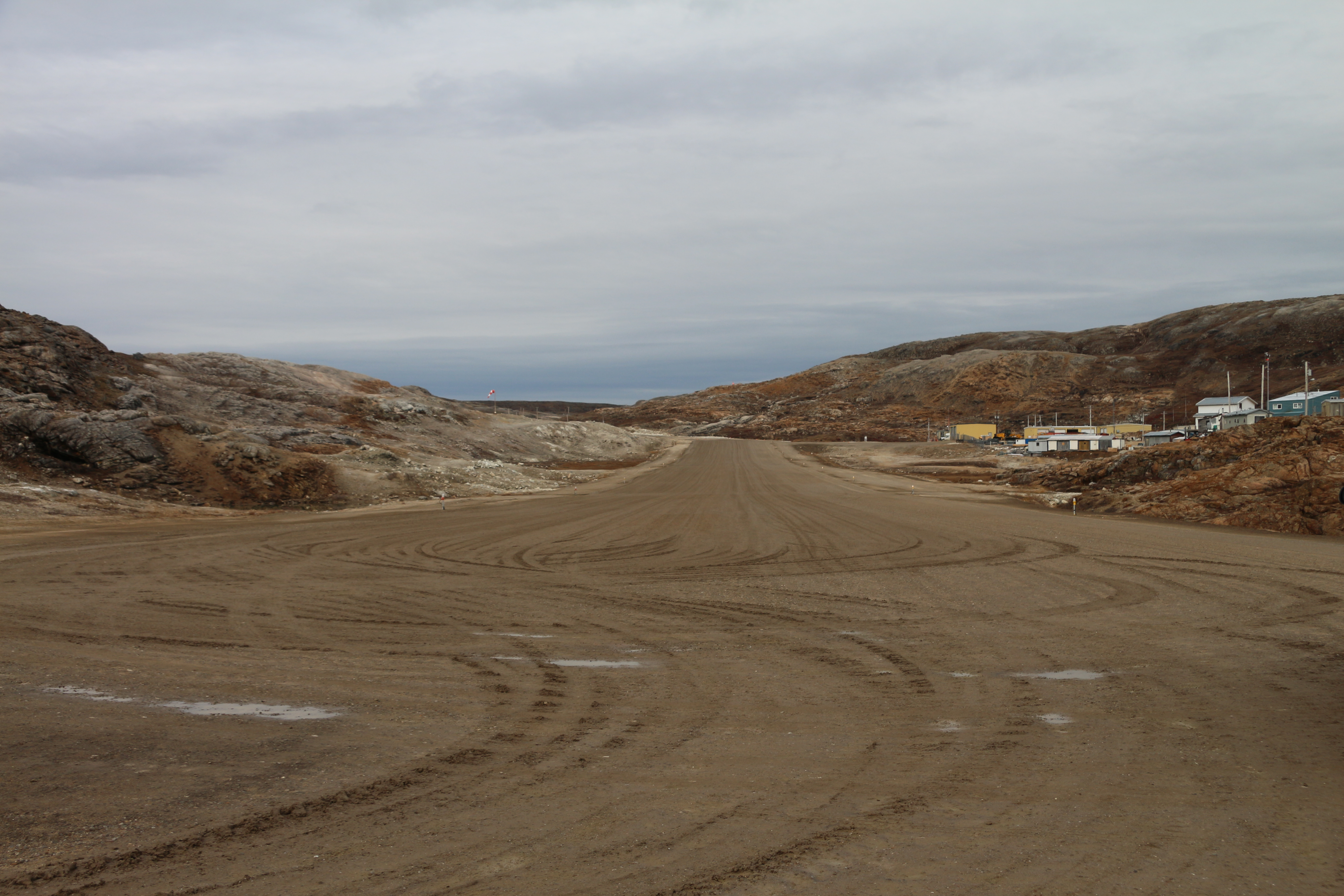
Threshold of runway 34 (now 33)

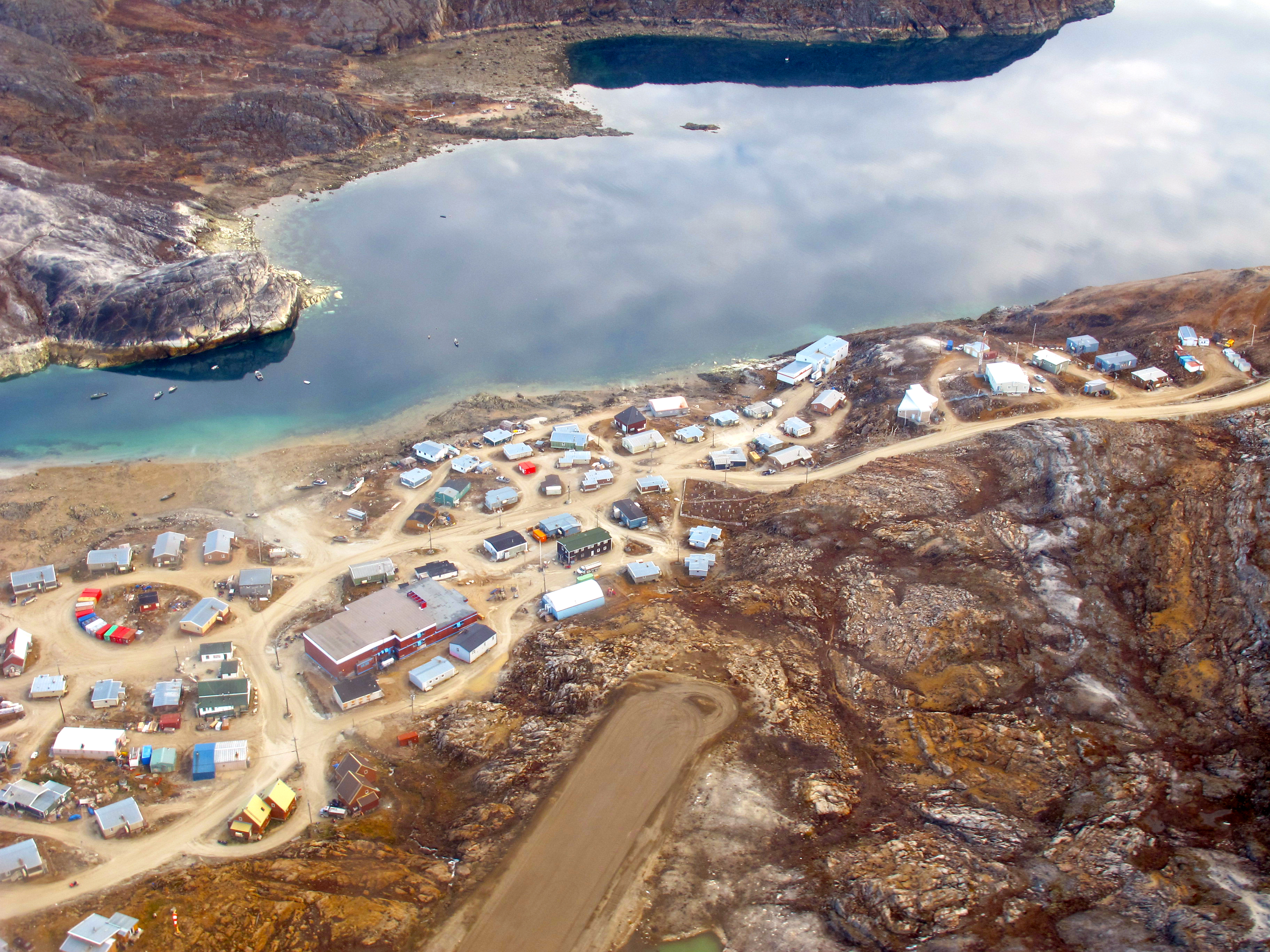
Overhead Kimmirut airport

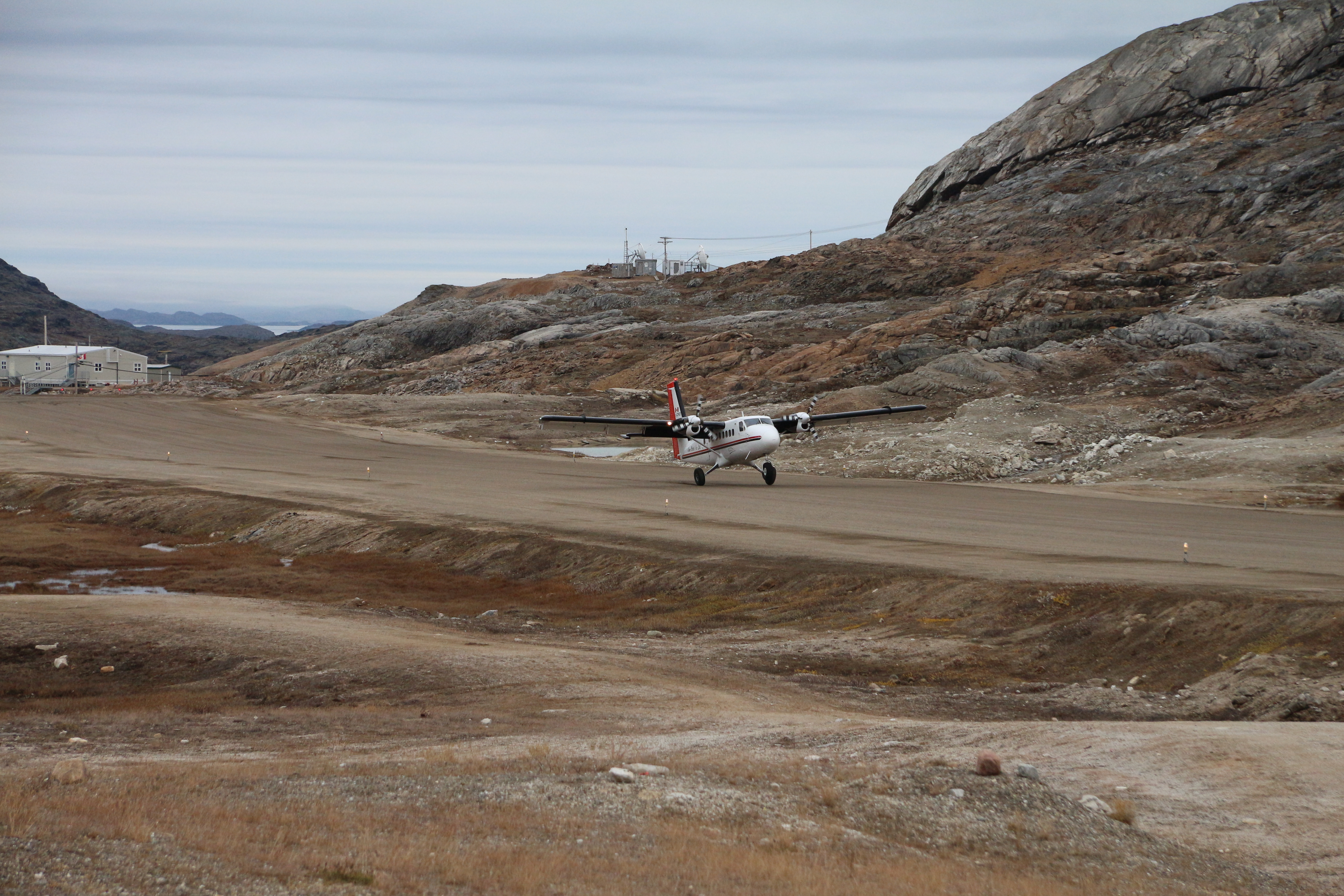
Twin Otter landing runway 34 (now 33)

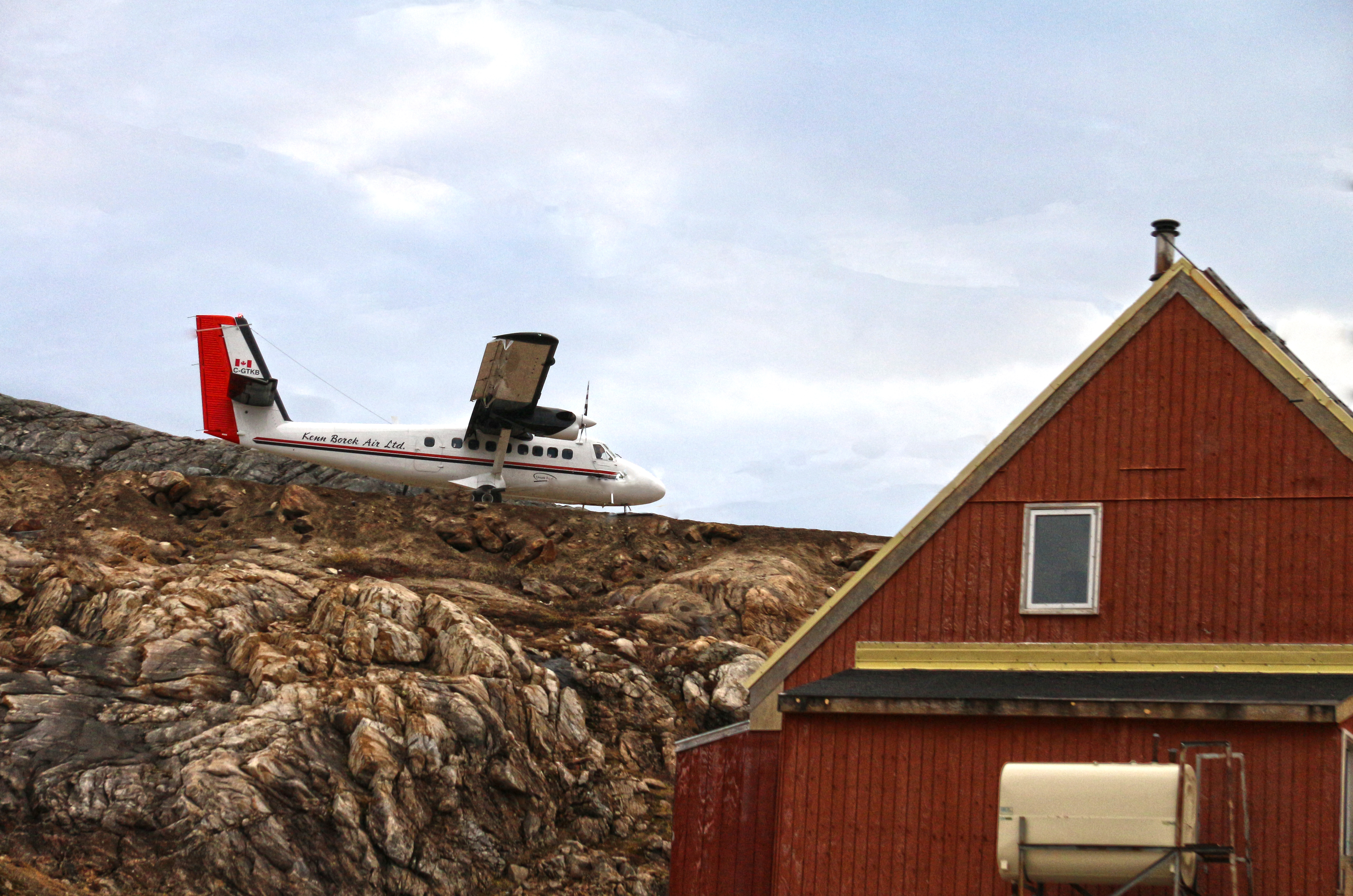
Twin Otter just landing on runway 34 (now 33)
