= Resolute Bay Airport =

Airport in Nunavut, Canada

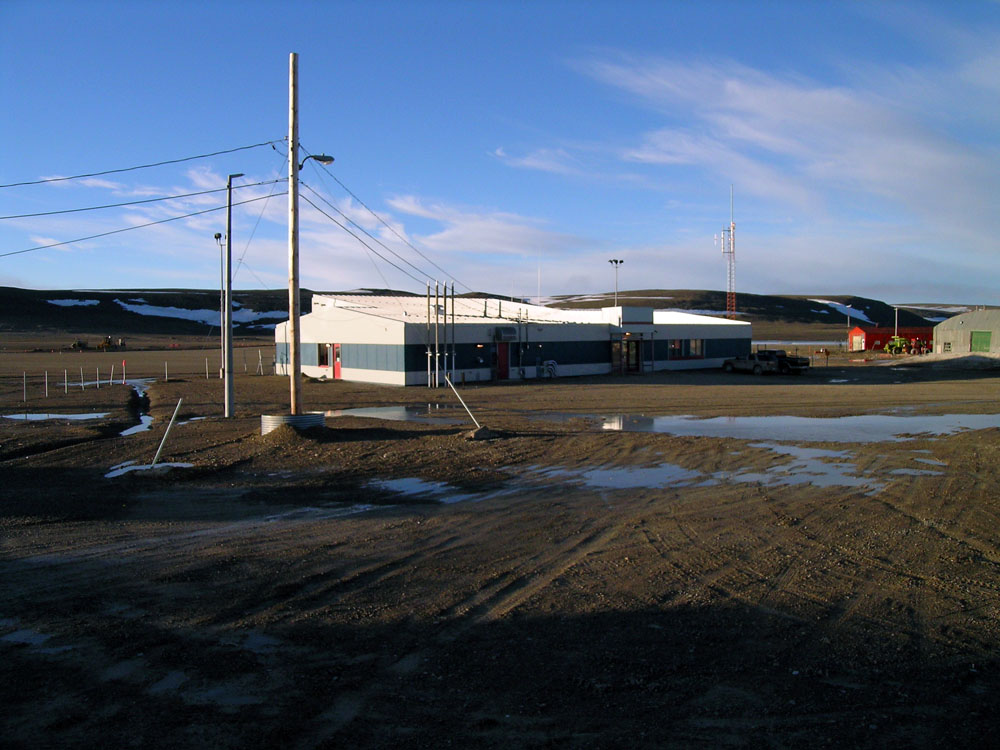
- IATA: YRB; ICAO: CYRB; WMO: 71924

Summary
- Airport type: Public
- Operator: Government of Nunavut
- Location: Resolute, Nunavut
- Time zone: CST (UTC−06:00)
  - Summer (DST): CDT (UTC−05:00)
- Elevation AMSL: 222 ft / 68 m
- Coordinates: 74°43′01″N 094°58′10″W

Map
- Location in Nunavut CYRB (Canada)

Runways
Direction	Length		Surface
Direction	ft	m	Surface
17/35	6,504	1,982	Gravel

Statistics (2010)
- Aircraft movements: 3,275
- Sources: Canada Flight Supplement; Environment Canada; Movements from Statistics Canada.

Resolute Bay Airport (IATA: YRB, ICAO: CYRB) is located at Resolute, Nunavut, Canada, and is operated by the government of Nunavut. It is the second northernmost aerodrome in Canada to receive scheduled passenger airline service; Grise Fiord Airport, which is served from Resolute, is further north. Alert Airport, the northernmost airport in Canada and the world, Tanquary Fiord Airport, and Eureka Aerodrome are all further north but have no scheduled services. Alert and Eureka are both served by Resolute.

== Airport ==
The airport has served as a major transportation hub in the Canadian Arctic. Today the airport is an important refuelling stop for aircraft passing through to other places in the high Arctic such as CFS Alert, Eureka and Mould Bay. Unlike some airports in Nunavut, Resolute is equipped with an ILS precision landing system, allowing for large commercial aircraft operations. The VOR/DME is located atop a hill near the airport. The airport is not equipped with radar; however, during 2011's Operation Nanook, a temporary radar installation was used for the duration of that exercise.

=== Proposed expansion ===
As of 2011, the Royal Canadian Air Force was considering a major expansion of the airport to transform it into a key base for Arctic operations. The expansion would include a 3,000 m (9,800 ft) paved runway, hangars, fuel installations and other infrastructure.

The site would provide logistics for search and rescue operations according to a December 2011 briefing from the Arctic Management Office at 1 Canadian Air Division.

== Airlines and destinations ==
Airlines	Destinations
Canadian North	Arctic Bay, Grise Fiord, Iqaluit

Kenn Borek Air also operates charter flights.

=== Historical passenger airline service ===
Historically, the airport was served by several airlines operating direct, no-change-of-plane scheduled passenger jet service from such Canadian cities as Calgary, Edmonton, Montreal, Ottawa, Winnipeg and Yellowknife. Airlines included Canadian Airlines, Nordair, Pacific Western Airlines and Transair. Jet aircraft operated in the past in scheduled service into the airport included Boeing 727 and Boeing 737 jetliners. First Air also operated scheduled jet service with Boeing 727-200 as well as with Boeing 727-100 and Boeing 737-200 aircraft in the past.

Nordair was serving Resolute in 1964 with Douglas DC-4 prop aircraft, with twice-weekly flights from Montreal Dorval Airport via intermediate stops in Fort Chimo (now Kuujjuaq), Frobisher Bay (now Iqaluit) and Hall Beach (now Sanirajak). In 1968, Nordair was operating nonstop service from Montreal twice a week with Lockheed L-1049 Super Constellation propliners, with the southbound Constellation return flights to Montreal making an intermediate stop in Frobisher Bay, with the airline also operating twice-weekly Douglas DC-4 service to Montreal at this time via en route stops in Frobisher Bay and Hall Beach. Pacific Western Airlines was serving Resolute by 1969 with Douglas DC-6 service, flown once a week, with this flight operating a routing of Edmonton - Yellowknife - Cambridge Bay - Resolute. By 1970, Nordair had introduced Boeing 737-200 jet service direct to Montreal Dorval Airport, with three flights a week being operated via a stop in Frobisher Bay.

According to the February 1, 1976 Official Airline Guide (OAG), three airlines were flying scheduled passenger jet service into the Resolute Bay Airport at this time: Nordair, operating Boeing 737-200 flights twice a week from Montreal Dorval Airport via an intermediate stop in Frobisher Bay; Pacific Western Airlines, operating Boeing 727-100 flights twice a week on a routing of Calgary International Airport - Edmonton International Airport - Yellowknife Airport - Resolute Bay Airport; and Transair, operating Boeing 737-200 flights once a week from Winnipeg via an intermediate stop in Churchill.

The September 15, 1994 OAG listed two airlines flying scheduled jet service into the airport at that time: Canadian Airlines (which formerly operated as CP Air), operating direct Boeing 737 flights from Edmonton twice a week and also twice a week direct from Montreal; and First Air, operating direct Boeing 727 flights from Ottawa once a week in addition to nonstop 727 flights from Yellowknife once a week. Canadian Airlines flights from Edmonton International Airport made intermediate stops in Yellowknife and Cambridge Bay while its flights from Montreal Dorval Airport made intermediate stops at Iqaluit Airport and Nanisivik Airport. The First Air service from Ottawa also made intermediate stops in Iqaluit and Nanisivik. The OAG indicates that Canadian and First Air were both operating gravel kit-equipped combi aircraft versions of their respective Boeing jets on their flights into the airport, with these aircraft being capable of being flown in mixed passenger/freight configuration, and also listed local flights into Resolute from Grise Fiord, Nanisivik and Pond Inlet, operated by Kenn Borek Air with de Havilland Canada DHC-6 Twin Otter STOL turboprop aircraft.

As of early 2022, Canadian North serves Resolute only with twin-turboprop ATR 42 aircraft. Its sole route to Resolute is from Iqaluit, with a stop at Arctic Bay. Boeing 737 jet connections are provided between Montreal/Ottawa and Iqaluit. Any future jet service to Resolute from southern Canadian cities cannot land at Arctic Bay en route, because it has only a 3,935-foot-long runway. The 6,400-foot runway at nearby Nanisivik Airport was closed to civilian air traffic on January 13, 2011, and is 9.2 miles from the new Nanisivik Naval Facility being constructed near Nanisivik. A key reason for siting the new Canadian naval base there is the prior presence of the "jet-capable" runway, which will now become part of the new naval base.

== Accidents ==
- On March 15, 1951, a Royal Canadian Air Force (RCAF) Douglas C-54 Skymaster crashed on approach. There were no fatalities but the aircraft was a write-off.
- On June 12, 1968, a Fokker F27 operated by Great Northern Airways crashed on approach to the airport. There were no fatalities but the aircraft was a write-off.
- On August 20, 2011, First Air Flight 6560, a Boeing 737-200 charter flight transporting eleven passengers from Yellowknife, crashed while approaching the airport. Out of the fifteen people aboard, three passengers survived the crash; the four crew members perished. The extreme magnetic variation in the area was cited as a contributing factor to the crew's errors leading to the crash.

== Gallery ==
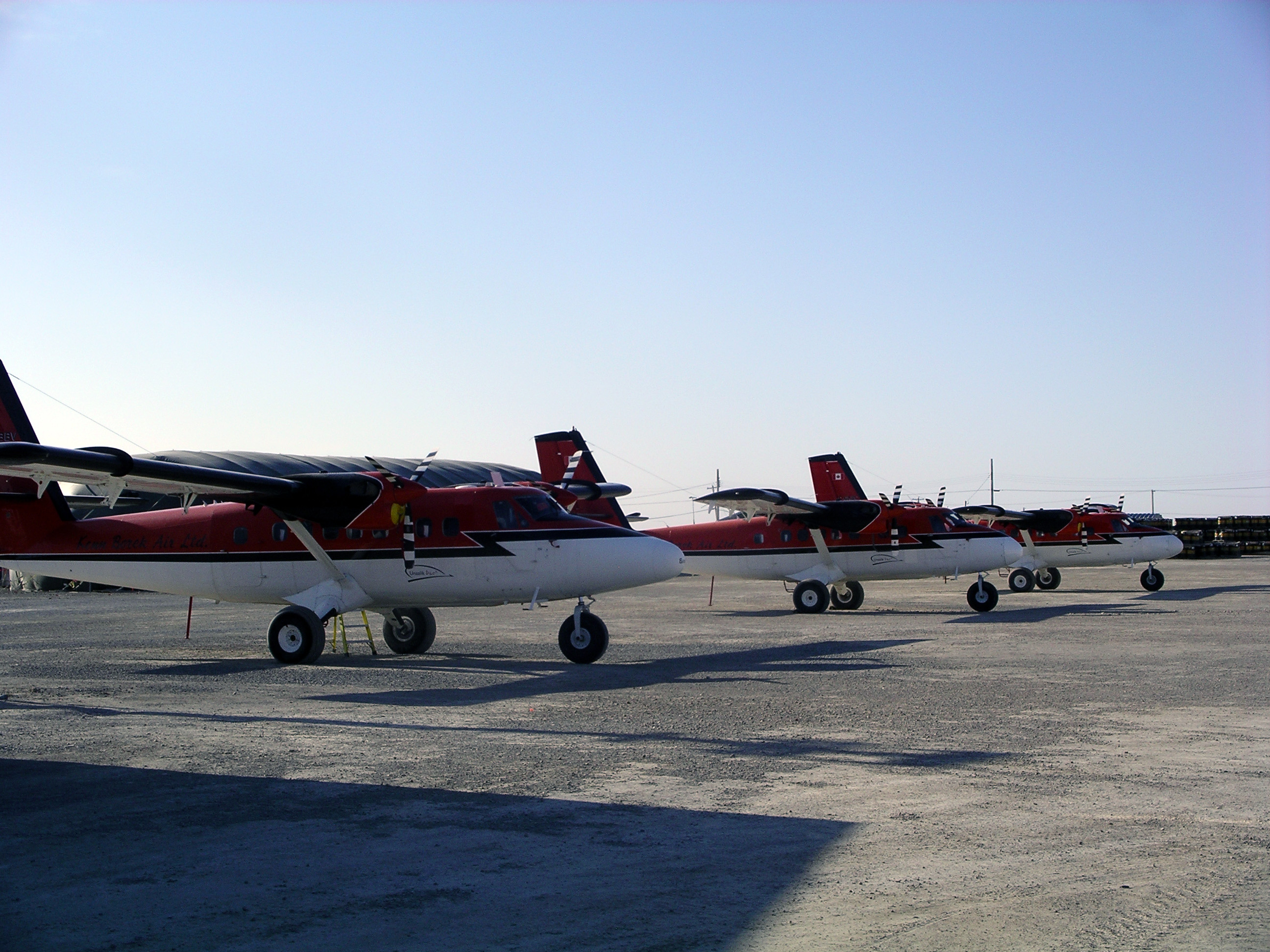
Borek Air

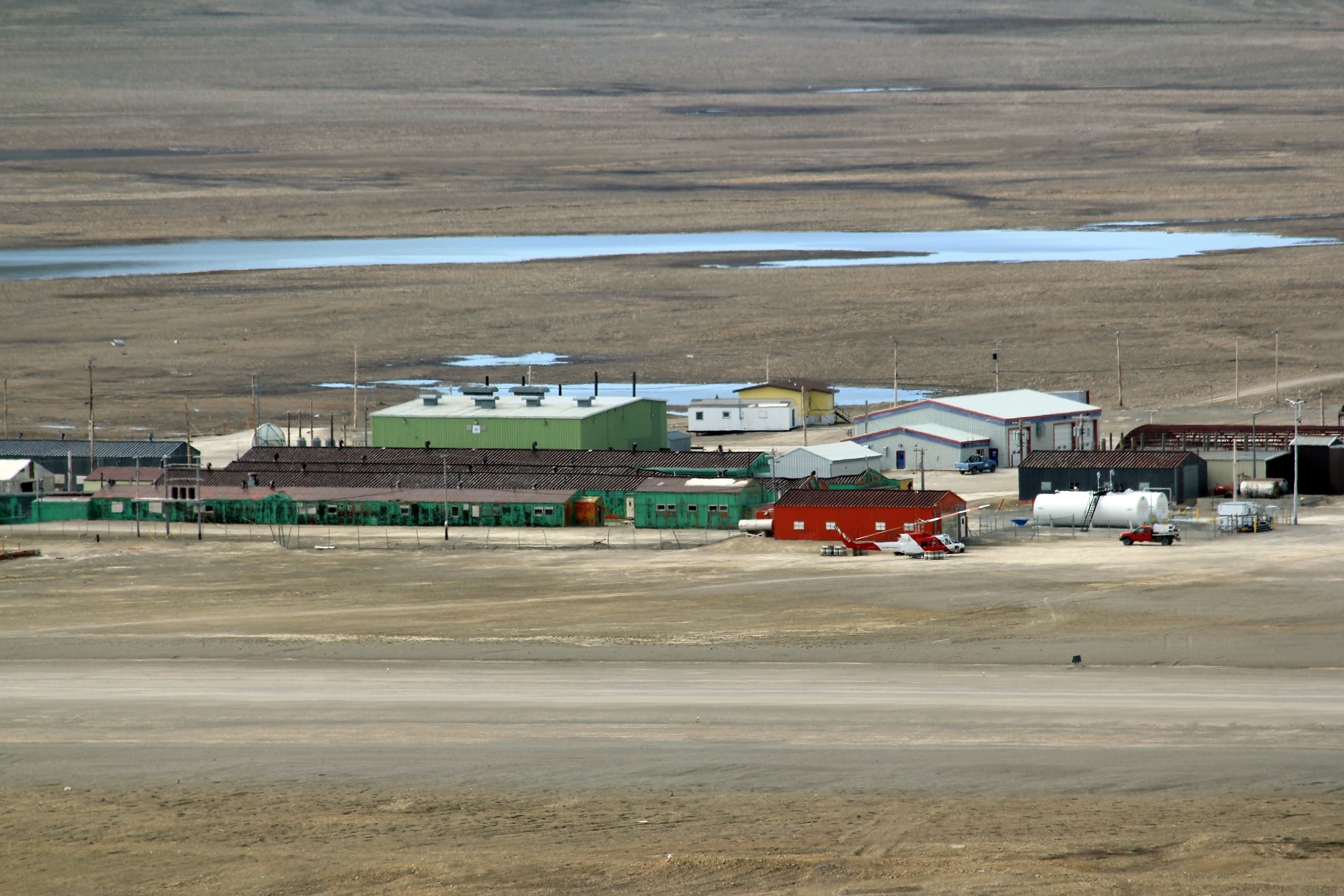
Resolute Bay Airport

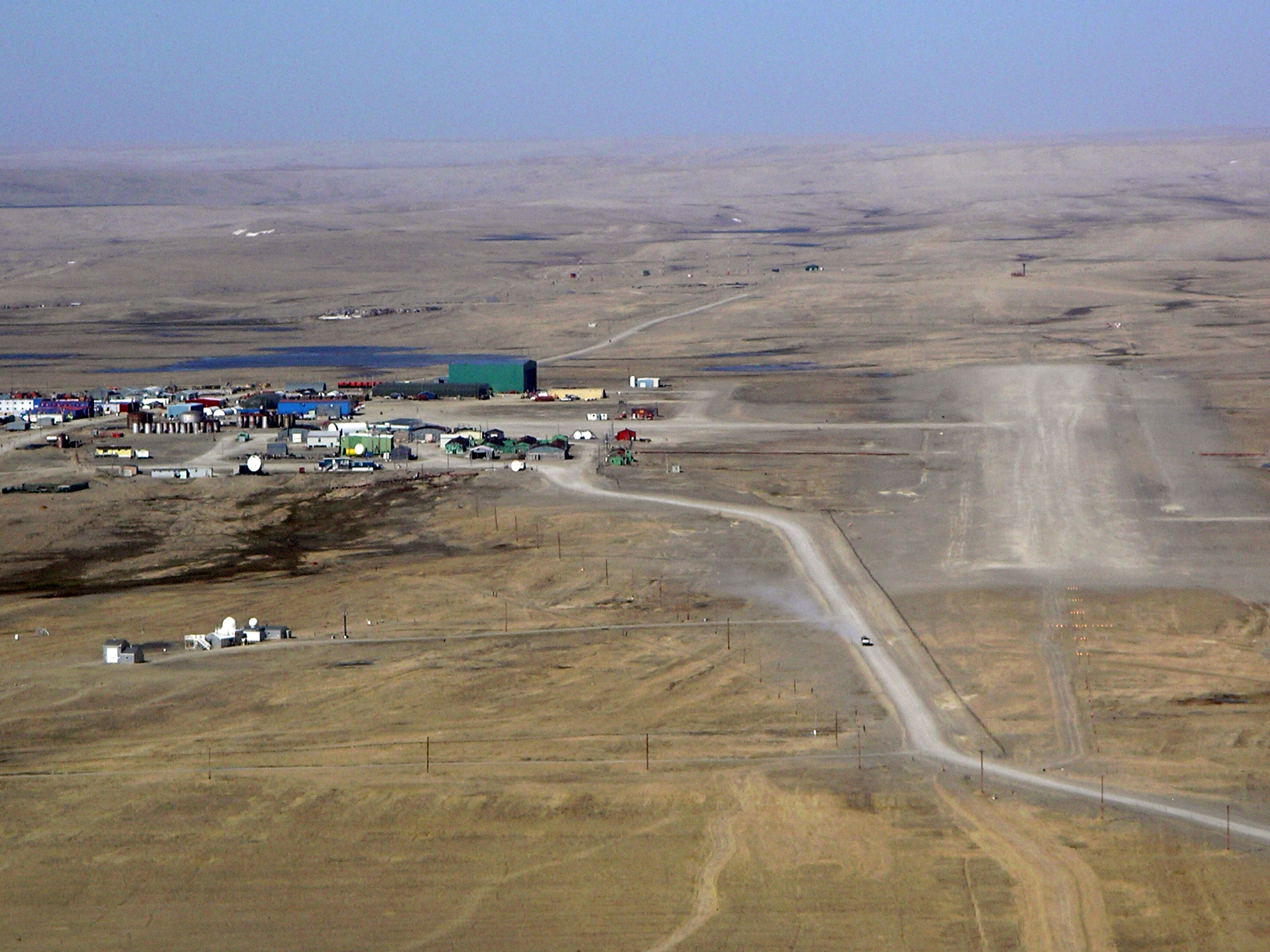
Runway 35 True

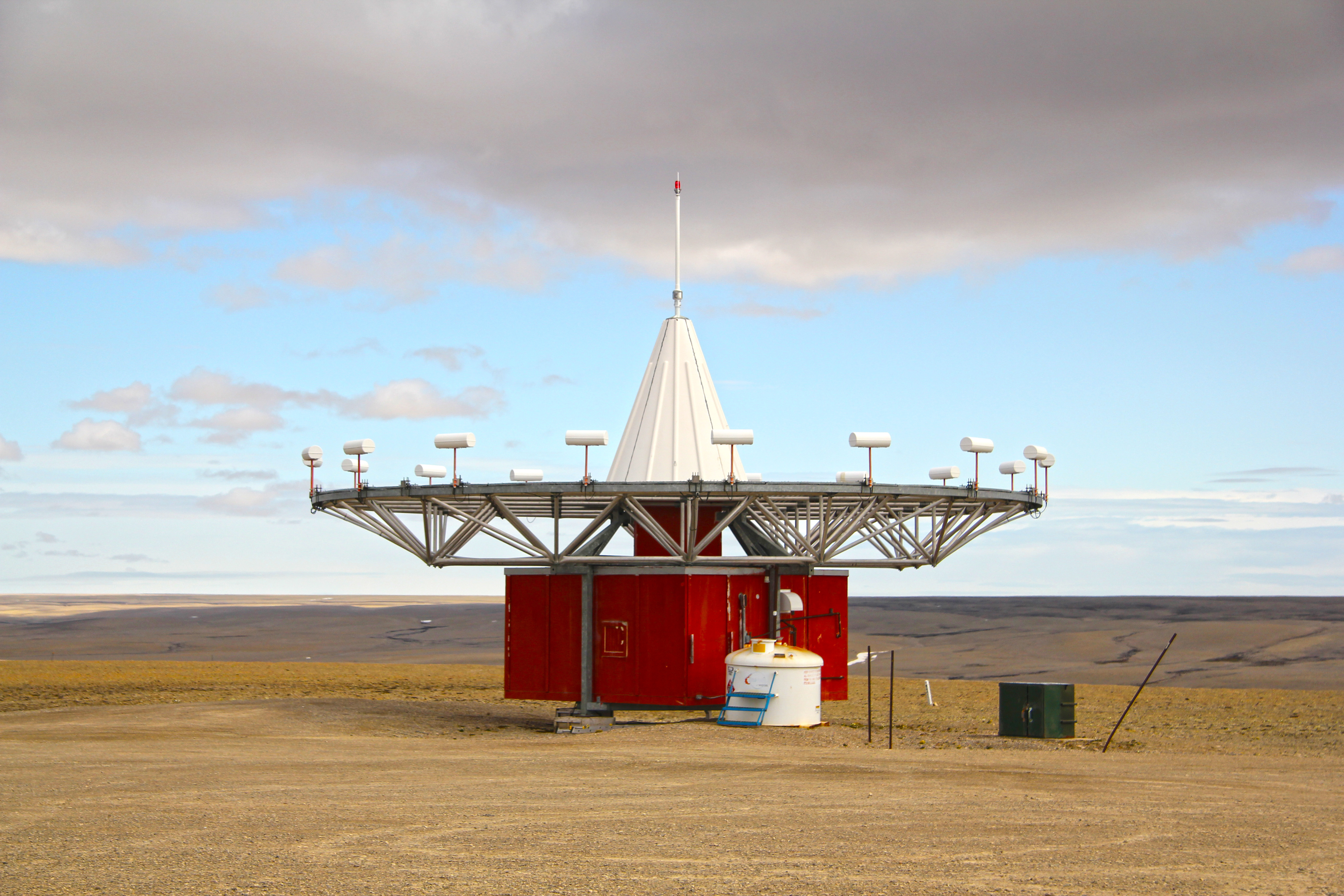
VOR station atop Signal Hill about 1 mile east of the airport

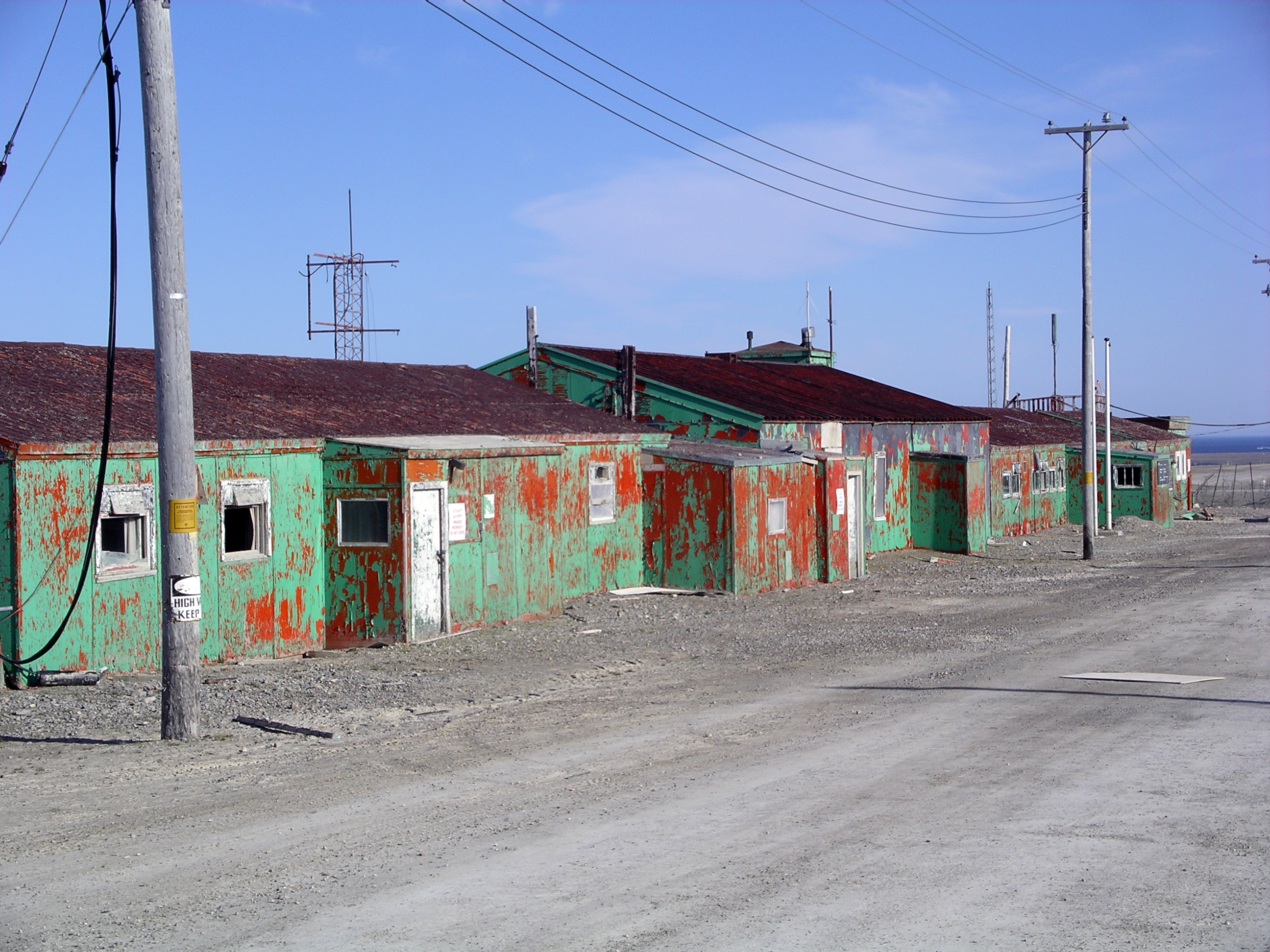
Abandoned building, showing its age

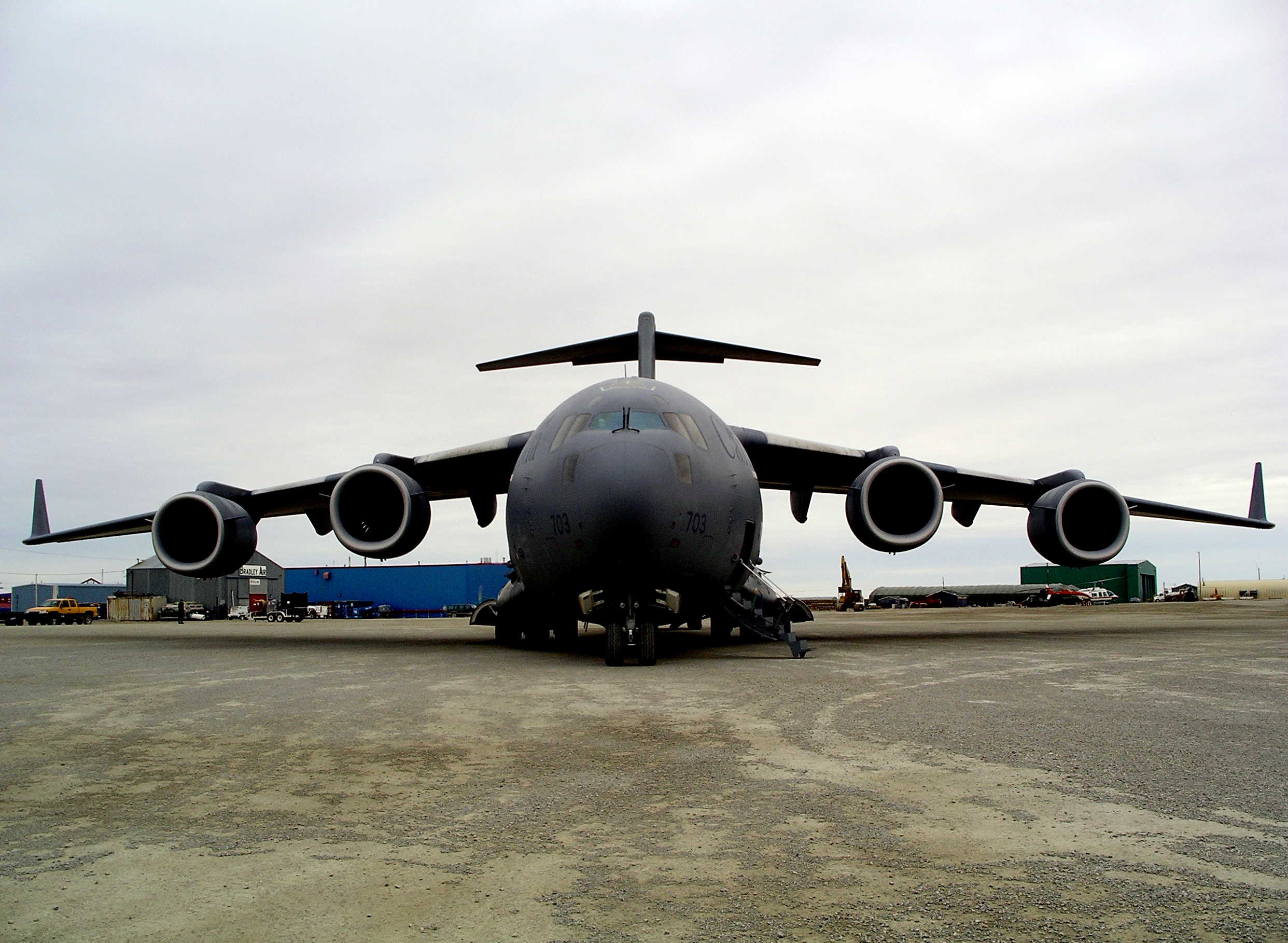
Part of Operation Nanook
