= Canadian North =

Canadian airline

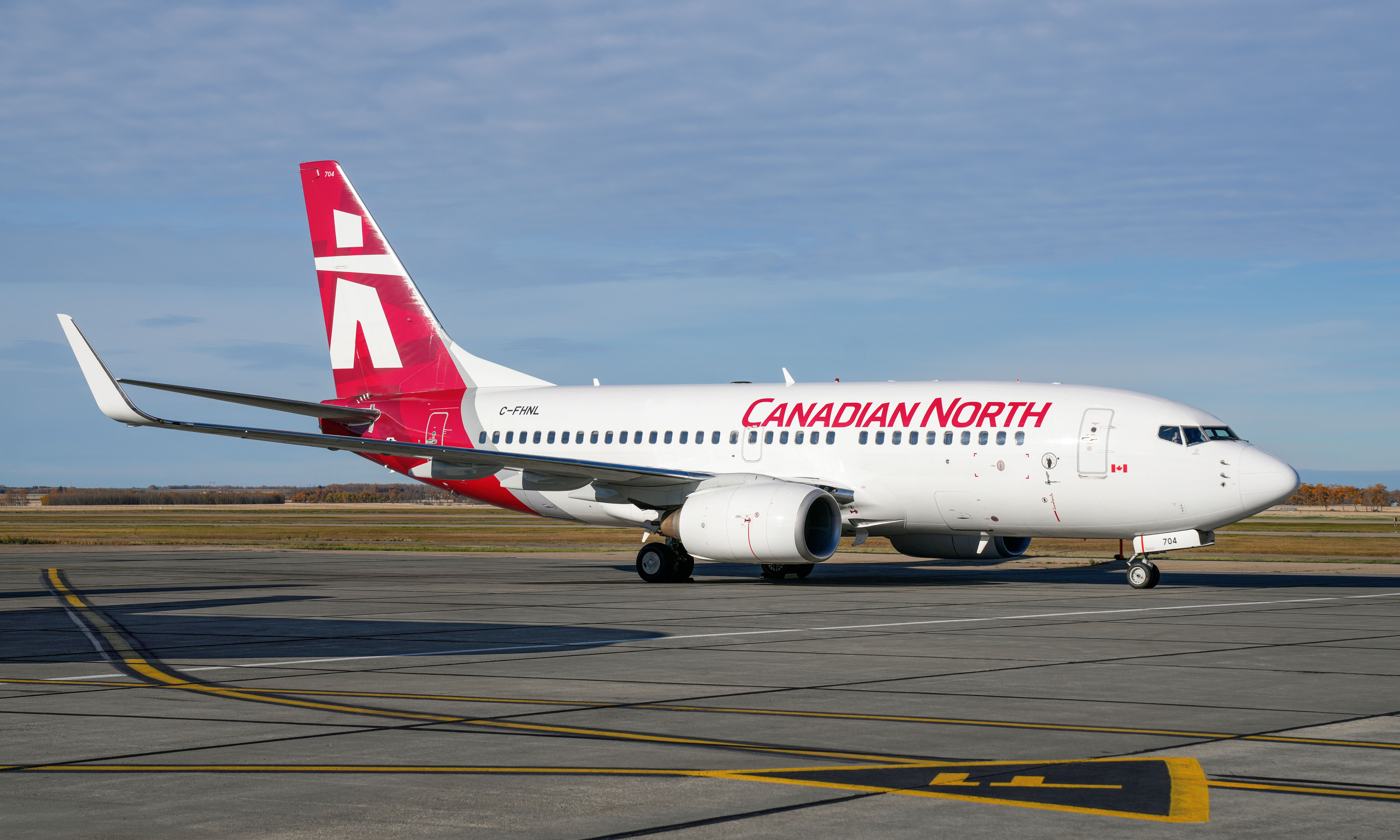
- Canadian North Boeing 737-700
IATA	ICAO	Call sign
5T	AKT	ARCTIC
- Founded: 1946; 80 years ago (as Bradley Air Services)
- Commenced operations: 1998; 28 years ago (as Canadian North)
- AOC #: Canada: 107 (First Air & Canadian North); United States: N0OF050F
- Hubs: Iqaluit; Yellowknife
- Focus cities: Cambridge Bay
- Frequent-flyer program: Aeroplan; Aurora Rewards
- Fleet size: 32
- Destinations: 28
- Parent company: Exchange Income Corporation
- Headquarters: 145 Thad Johnson Private, Ottawa, Ontario
- Key people: Shelly De Caria (president & CEO)
- Website: www.canadiannorth.com

Bradley Air Services, operating as Canadian North, is a Canadian airline headquartered in Ottawa, Ontario, Canada. It operates scheduled passenger services to communities in the Northwest Territories, Nunavut, and the Nunavik region of Quebec, as well as southern destinations such as Edmonton and Ottawa. It also has an interlining agreement with Air Greenland.

== History ==
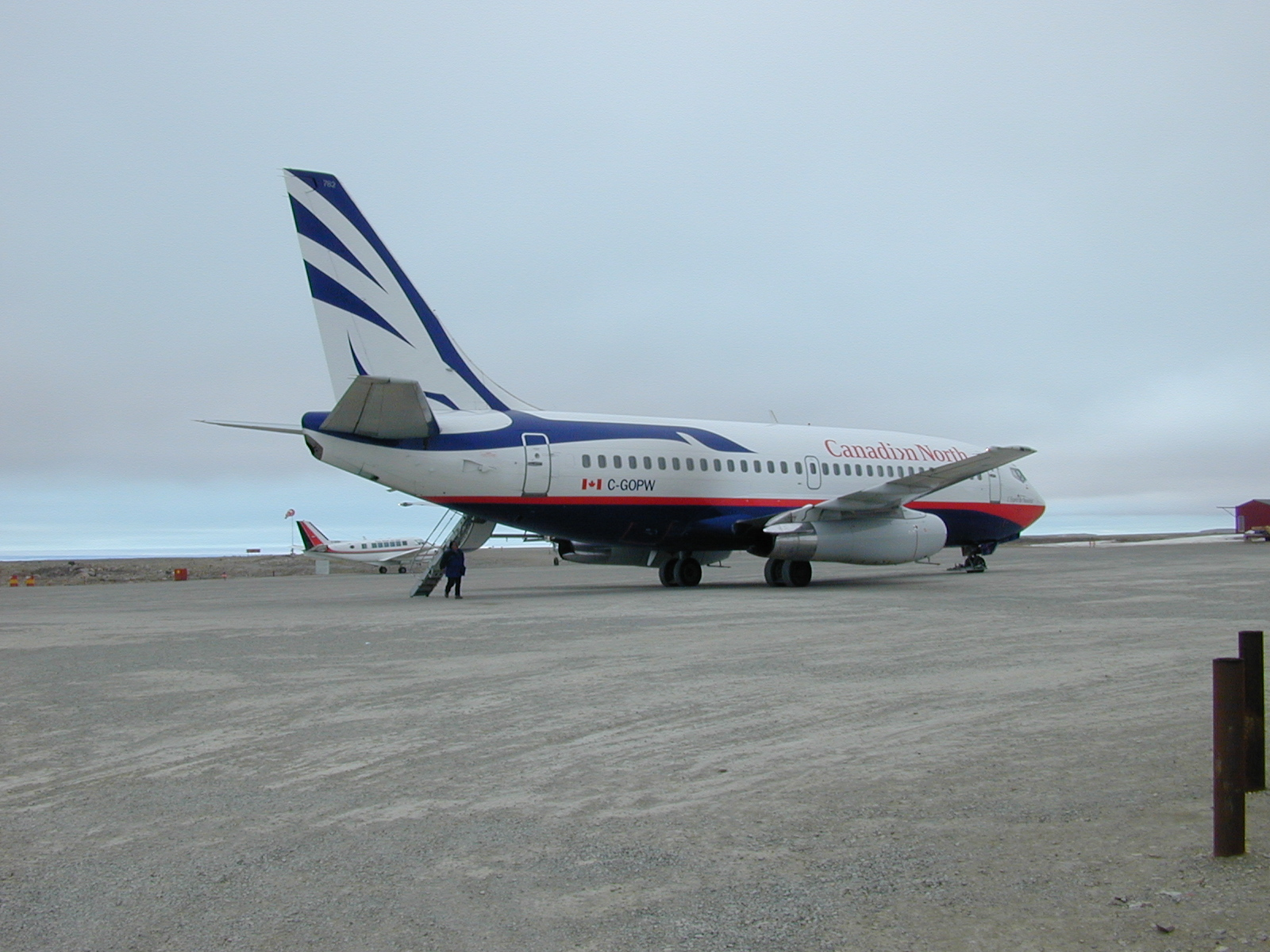
A 200 Series, Canadian North Boeing 737 at Cambridge Bay Airport in 1999

Canadian North was established in 1989 as a subsidiary of Canadian Airlines International, specifically to serve northern Canadian communities' needs. The airline traces its roots to former operators Nordair in eastern Canada and the Canadian Arctic, and Pacific Western Airlines in western Canada and also in the Canadian Arctic. Wardair also maintained a significant Arctic presence during its existence.

In September 1998, Norterra purchased Canadian North, whose ownership was divided equally among the Inuvialuit Development Corporation, representing the Inuvialuit people of the western Canadian Arctic, and Nunasi Corporation, representing the Inuit of Nunavut.

Logo used by the airline from 2003 to 2019

After utilizing three different livery schemes, Canadian North adopted its final pre-merger logo in 2003. Its logo displayed three of the distinctive symbols of the North: the polar bear, the midnight sun and the Northern Lights. Canadian North's slogan was changed from "Your North. Your Airline" to "seriously northern" (all in lower-case), with advertising changed to reflect different aspects of the company (serious service, serious delivery, etc.).

In June 2007, Canadian North began serving the Kitikmeot communities of Gjoa Haven, Taloyoak, Kugaaruk, and Kugluktuk. In April 2008, flights began to seven communities in the Qikiqtaaluk Region (Baffin Region) of Nunavut.

On 1 April 2014, the Inuvialuit Development Corporation (IDC), representing the Inuvialuit of the Inuvialuit Settlement Region, bought the 50% share of Norterra held by Nunasi. The purchase of Nunasi's interest in Norterra gave the IDC complete control of Canadian North, Northern Transportation Company (now Marine Transportation Services), and other companies that were jointly-held. On 11 April 2014, Norterra and Makivvik, owners of First Air announced that they were in negotiations to merge the two airlines. According to a website that had been set up on that same day, the new airline would be owned equally between the two companies and "a merger would create a stronger, more sustainable business, provide better service to customers and lead to new economic development opportunities across the North. We believe the two companies would complement each other's strengths." In October 2014, it was announced the merger would not go through, but Canadian North would still codeshare on some flights with First Air until 16 May 2017. On 23 February 2017, the Inuvialuit Development Corporation (IDC) announced that arrangements had been concluded to transfer ownership of Canadian North directly into Inuvialuit Development Corporation.

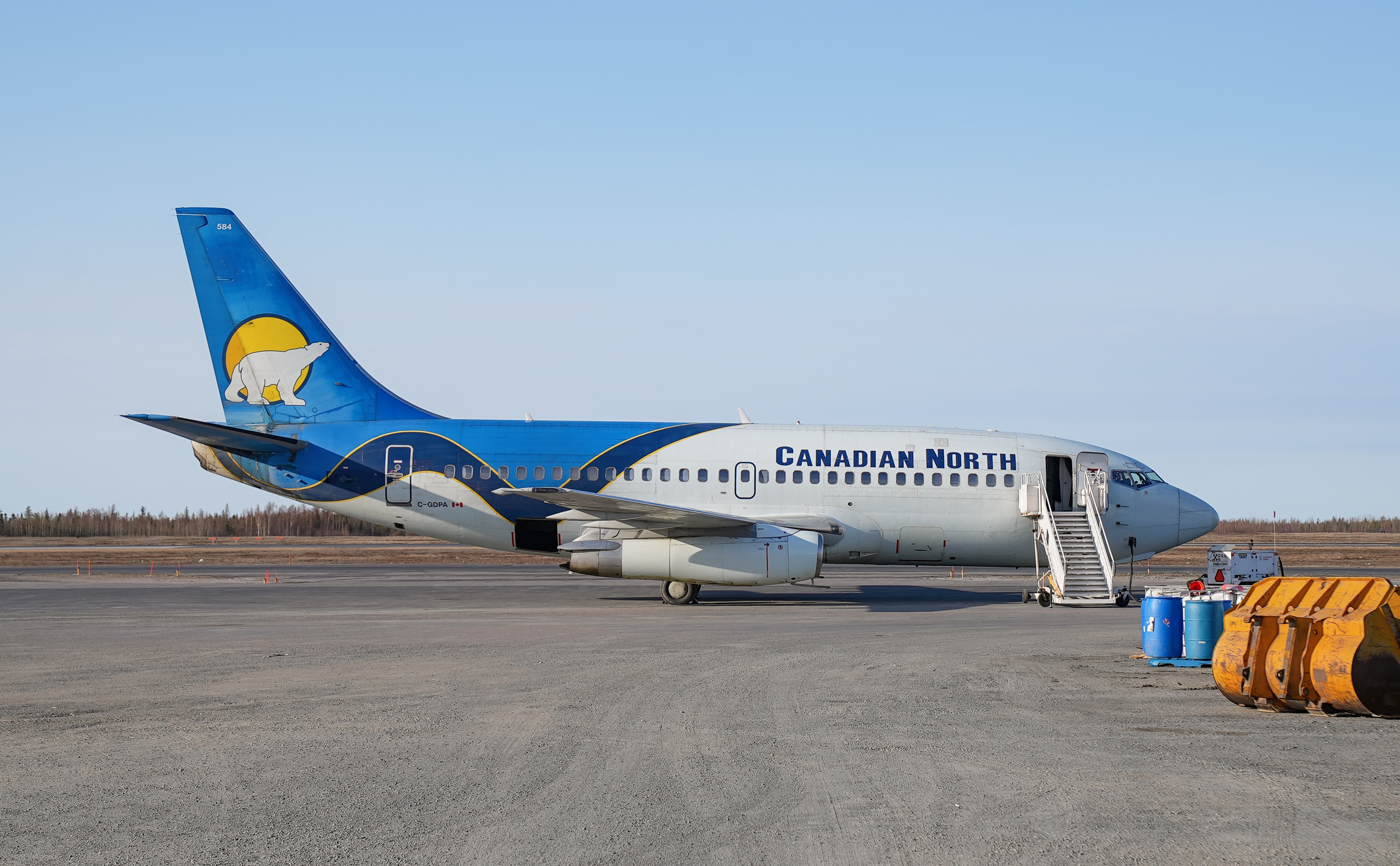
A former Canadian North Boeing 737-200 at Yellowknife Airport in 2023. The metal bar under the engine forms part of the gravel kit.

Bradley Air Services, later operating under the trade name First Air, was founded by Canadian aviation pioneer Russel (Russ) Bradley, and started operations in 1946. Beginning as a flying school in Ottawa, Ontario, and moving in the fall of 1946 to Carp, Ontario, First Air started scheduled operations in 1973 between Ottawa and North Bay, Ontario. This service was operated with an eight-seat passenger plane.

In 1979, Bradley acquired the routes and some aircraft from Survair, which itself had taken over the smaller Arctic community routes from Nordair Arctic, which was itself derived from the main airline, Nordair. Future Bradley acquisitions included Ptarmigan Airways, and later NWT Air, both Yellowknife based.

On 28 September 2018, Makivvik Corporation and the Inuvialuit Corporate Group (ICG) signed a definitive agreement to merge Canadian North and First Air, again awaiting federal government approval. The new airline would use the new First Air livery, but would operate under the name "Canadian North". On 19 June 2019, the federal government gave approval to the merger provided several terms and conditions were met.

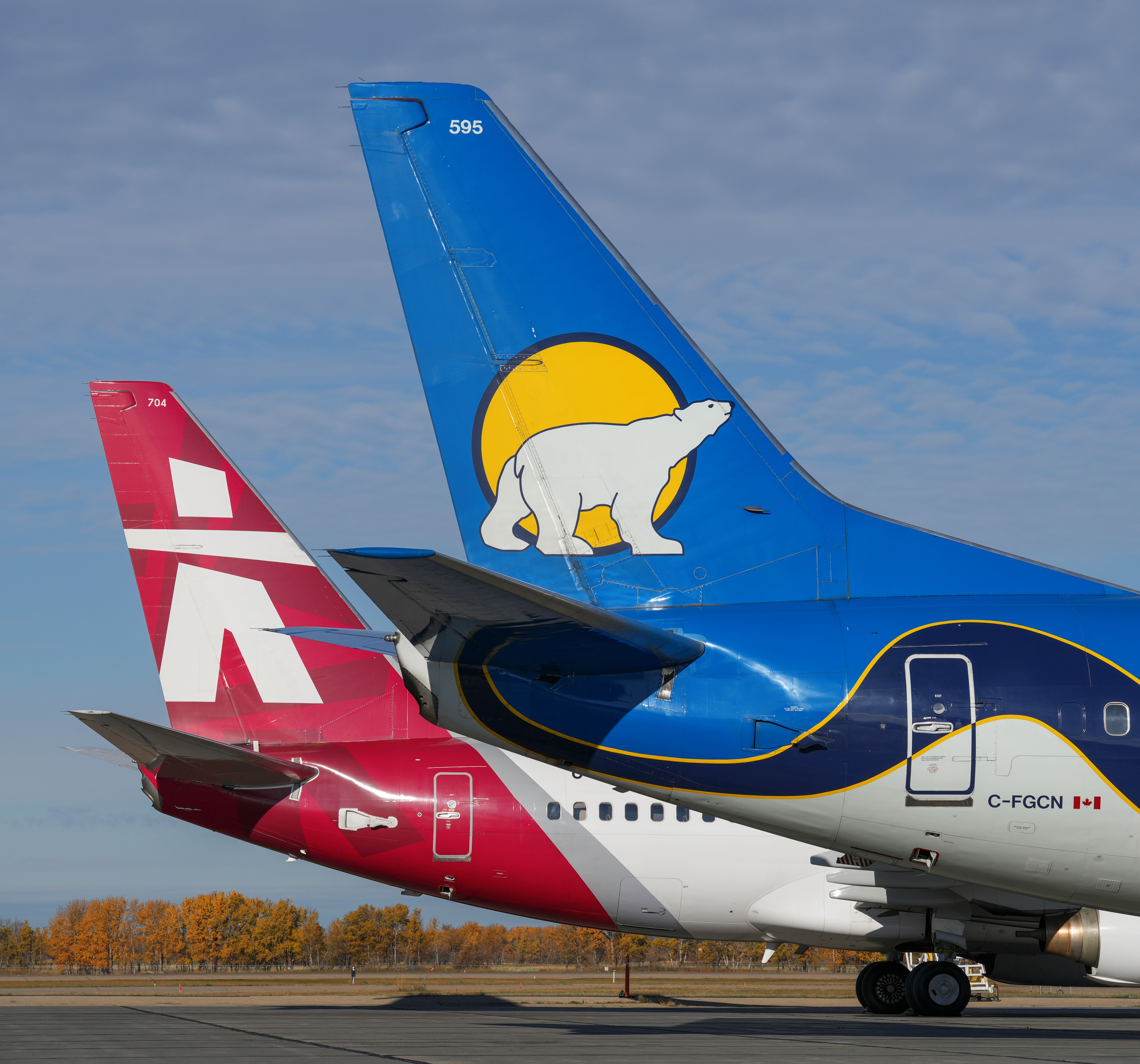
The new and old liveries painted on 737 tails

On 1 November 2019, First Air and Canadian North completed the merger and combined schedules into one, using the code 5T, dropping First Air's 7F code as well as the name but keeping the livery. In early 2021 the call signs "First Air" and "Empress" were retired and the combined airline began operating as 5T / AKT, call sign "Arctic."

As of 18 December 2021, operations are now under the Canadian North name with a new livery.

Canadian North confirmed in December 2022 that it was to retire its last Boeing 737 (of the 200 Series) by early 2023, replacing it with turboprop aircraft with similar gravel runway capabilities. The aircraft made its last scheduled flight with passengers on 6 May 2023.

In 2024, Canadian North began an interline partnership with Air Greenland, with Canadian North providing timed connections for passengers travelling from Kuujjuaq, Montreal and Ottawa to Air Greenland's once-weekly flight between Nuuk and Iqaluit.

On 24 February 2025, Makivvik and the Inuvialuit Development Corporation announced that Canadian North was sold to Winnipeg-based Exchange Income Corporation for $205 million; the sale was approved by regulatory authorities. On 2 July, it was announced that the transaction had been completed.

== Destinations ==
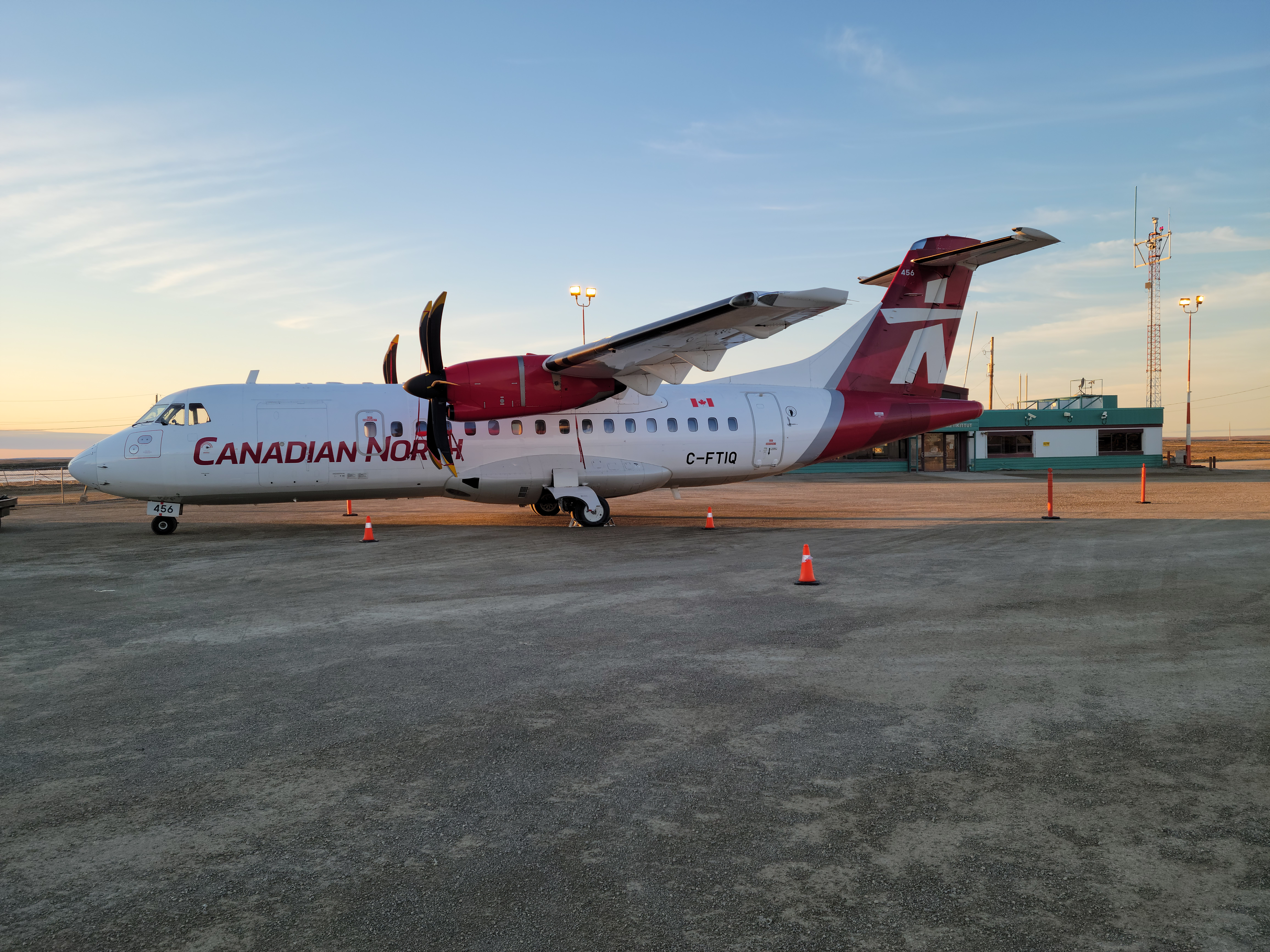
A Canadian North ATR 42-500 overnighting at Cambridge Bay Airport

As of 22 November 2026, Canadian North services 28 domestic scheduled destinations:

Province/territory	City	Airport	Notes
Alberta	Edmonton	Edmonton International Airport	Southern gateway
Manitoba	Winnipeg	Winnipeg Richardson International Airport	Codeshare route with Calm Air
Northwest Territories	Fort Simpson	Fort Simpson Airport	
Northwest Territories	Hay River	Hay River/Merlyn Carter Airport	
Northwest Territories	Inuvik	Inuvik (Mike Zubko) Airport	
Northwest Territories	Norman Wells	Norman Wells Airport	
Northwest Territories	Ulukhaktok	Ulukhaktok Airport	
Northwest Territories	Yellowknife	Yellowknife Airport	Hub
Nunavut	Arctic Bay	Arctic Bay Airport	
Nunavut	Cambridge Bay	Cambridge Bay Airport	Focus city
Nunavut	Clyde River	Clyde River Airport	
Nunavut	Gjoa Haven	Gjoa Haven Airport	
Nunavut	Grise Fiord	Grise Fiord Airport	
Nunavut	Igloolik	Igloolik Airport	
Nunavut	Iqaluit	Iqaluit Airport	Hub
Nunavut	Kimmirut	Kimmirut Airport	
Nunavut	Kinngait	Kinngait Airport	
Nunavut	Kugaaruk	Kugaaruk Airport	
Nunavut	Kugluktuk	Kugluktuk Airport	
Nunavut	Pangnirtung	Pangnirtung Airport	
Nunavut	Pond Inlet	Pond Inlet Airport	
Nunavut	Qikiqtarjuaq	Qikiqtarjuaq Airport	
Nunavut	Rankin Inlet	Rankin Inlet Airport	
Nunavut	Resolute	Resolute Bay Airport	
Nunavut	Sanirajak	Sanirajak Airport	
Nunavut	Taloyoak	Taloyoak Airport	
Ontario	Ottawa	Ottawa Macdonald–Cartier International Airport	Southern gateway
Quebec	Kuujjuaq	Kuujjuaq Airport	

=== Former destinations ===
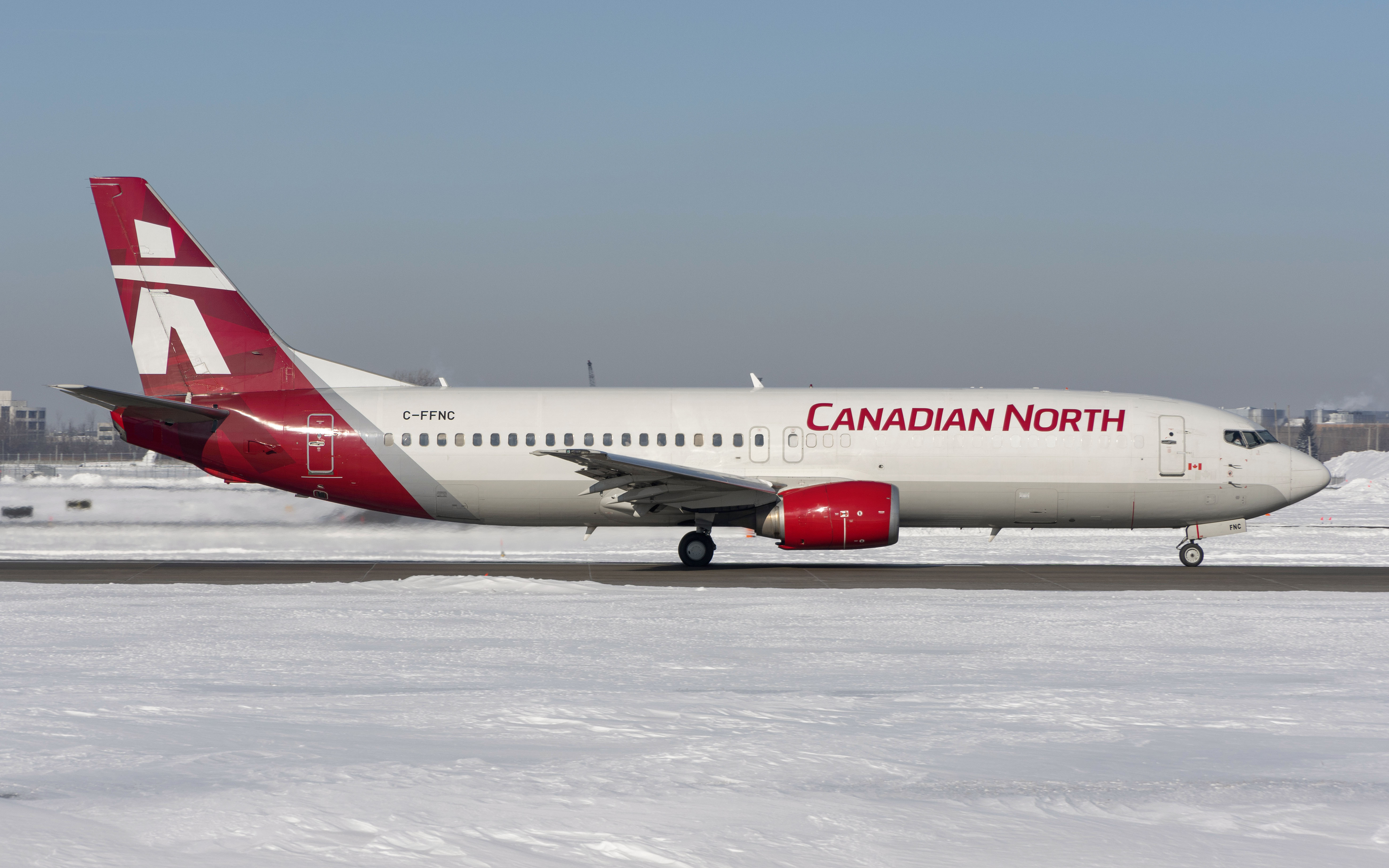
A Canadian North Boeing 737-400 taking off at Montréal–Trudeau International Airport

Province/territory	City	Airport	Notes
Alberta	Calgary	Calgary International Airport	Terminated
Ontario	Toronto	Toronto Pearson International Airport	Terminated
Quebec	Montreal	Montréal–Trudeau International Airport	Terminated

=== Charter operations ===
Canadian North offers charters to anywhere, non-stop flights in continental North America and maintain charter terminals at Edmonton.

=== Interline agreements ===
- Air Canada
- Air Greenland
- WestJet

== Fleet ==
=== Current fleet ===
Over time the registration of the fleet has moved from Canadian North to Bradley Air Services (First Air). As of 22 November 2026, the fleet consists of 32 aircraft all registered to Bradley Air Services. Numbers of aircraft are not available at the Canadian North website.

Canadian North fleet
Aircraft	In service	Variants	Orders	Notes
ATR 42	13	5 - 300; 2 - 320; 6 - 500	—	The ATR (sometimes Aérospatiale) 300 and 320 series are combi aircraft, ice / gravel runway capable and are both listed at Canadian North as 300 Series. All aircraft can take up to 42 passengers, and the 500 is passengers only
ATR 72	2	212A	—	Cargo variant. Listed at Canadian North as a ATR 72-500F.
Boeing 737 Classic	8	3 - 36N; 2 - 36Q; 2 - 406; 1 - 436	—	The 300 series can carry 136 passengers, two Quick Change (QC) aircraft, combi, can be converted to freight and can take up to 3 pallets and 80 passengers. Two 400C combi aircraft able to carry 78 passengers or 72 passengers and 4 pallets, and one 737-400 passenger only with 156 seats.
Boeing 737-700	9	1 - 705; 1 - 752; 1 - 76N; 3 - 783; 3 - 7CT	—	Passenger only, all aircraft listed by Canadian North as 700 Series. Either 134 or 138 passengers, no cargo.
Total	32			

=== Retired fleet ===
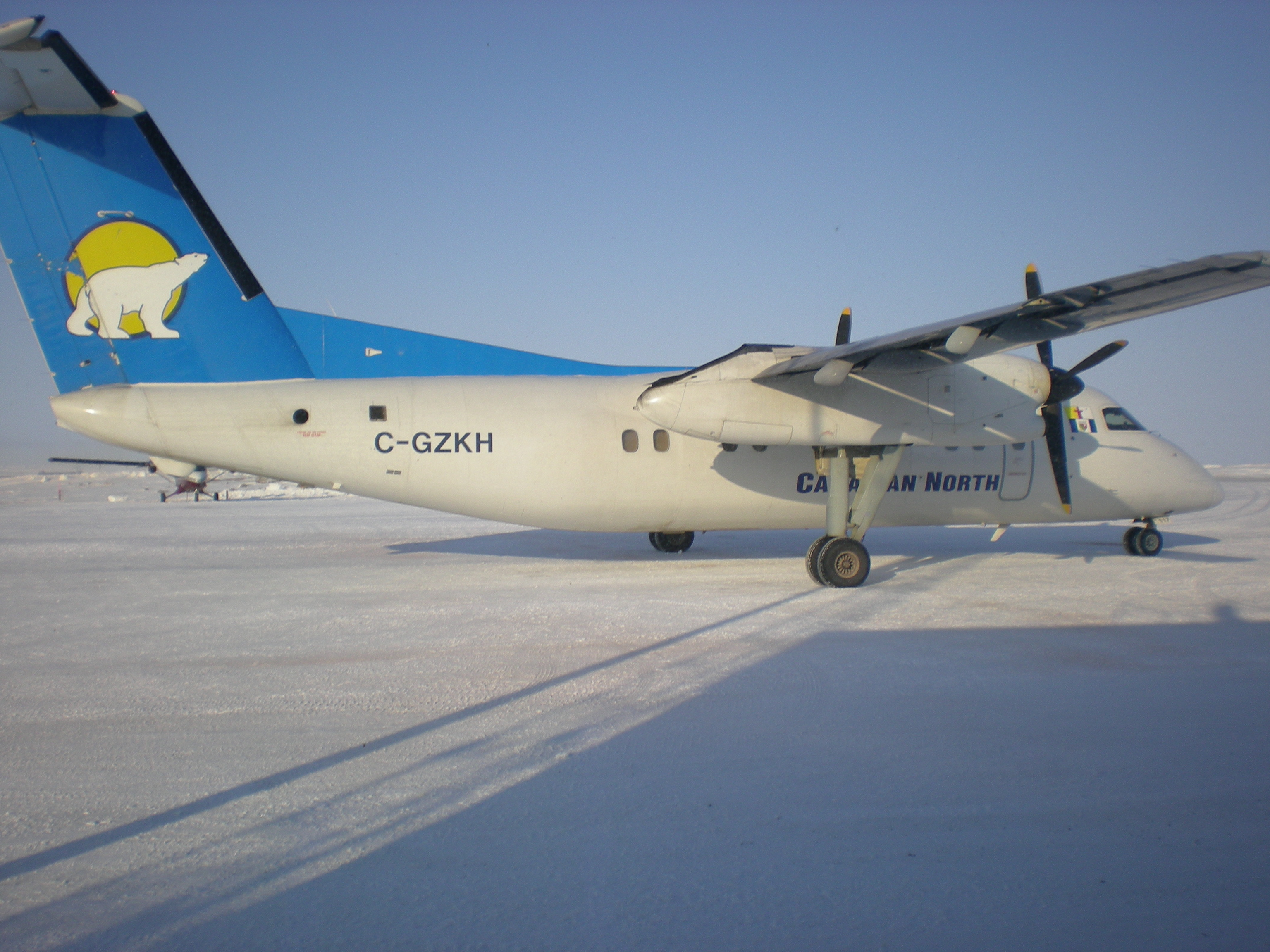
A former Canadian North De Havilland Canada Dash 8 Series 100. Pre-merger livery. The aircraft were retired in 2021

Aircraft previously operated include:

- Boeing 737-200 / 737-200C, the 737-200 could be equipped with a gravel kit which enabled them to land on gravel runways in Northern Canada.
- Fokker F28 Fellowship
- Fokker 100 (listed by Transport Canada as a F.28 Mk 0100)
- De Havilland Canada Dash 8

== Magazine ==
Canadian North uses Up Here as their inflight magazine.

== Corporate affairs ==
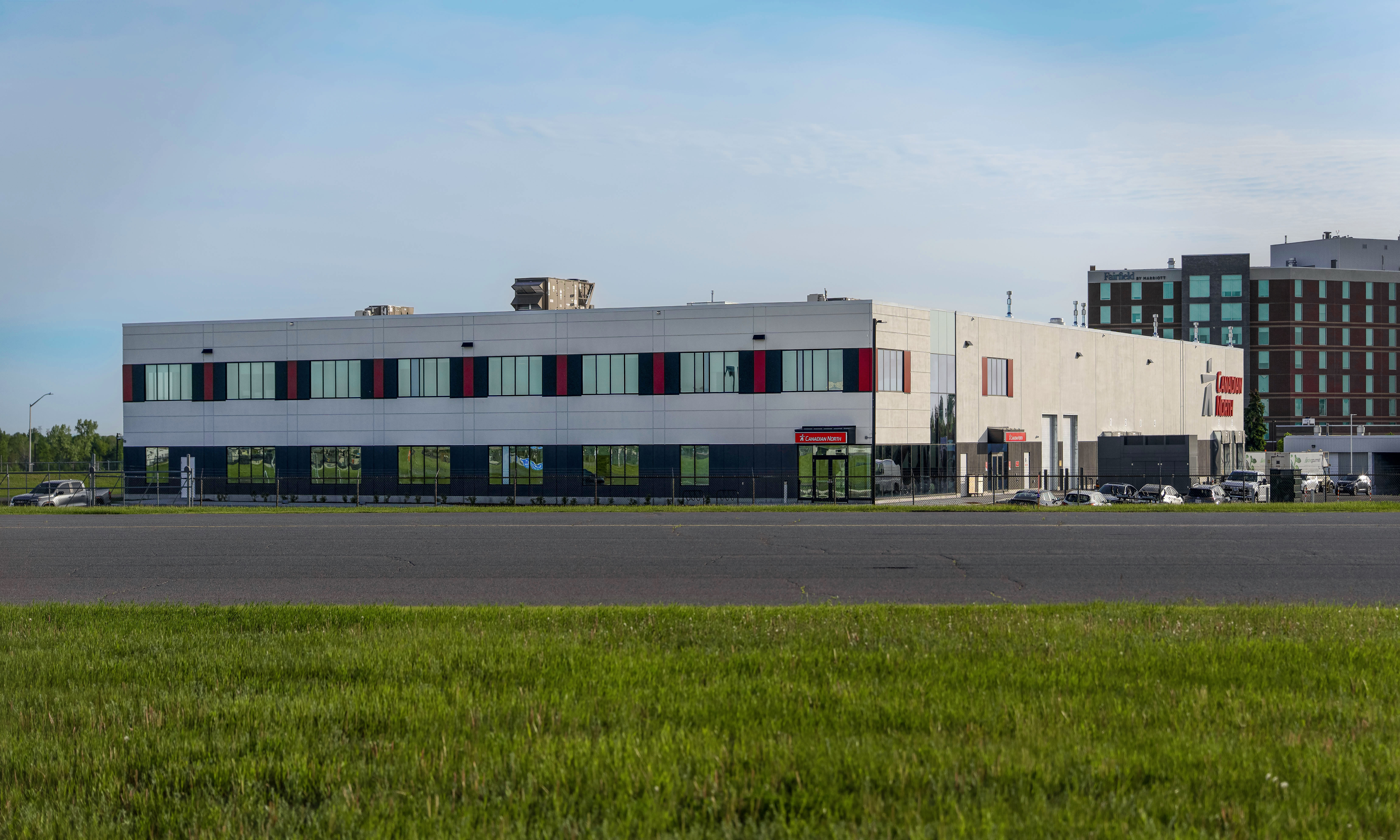
Canadian North's corporate headquarters at Ottawa International Airport

The company headquarters are in Ottawa, Ontario.

Canadian North had its headquarters in the Northwest Tower, in downtown Yellowknife. They were later moved to the grounds of Calgary International Airport in Calgary, Alberta but the airline kept its community and marketing support employees in Yellowknife. In addition it has regional offices in Iqaluit, Nunavut, and in Yellowknife, Northwest Territories. It also has an operations office in Edmonton, Alberta, on the grounds of Edmonton International Airport. Following the takeover by First Air, the former headquarters in Calgary was shut down and remaining management was transferred to Kanata.

== Programs and services ==
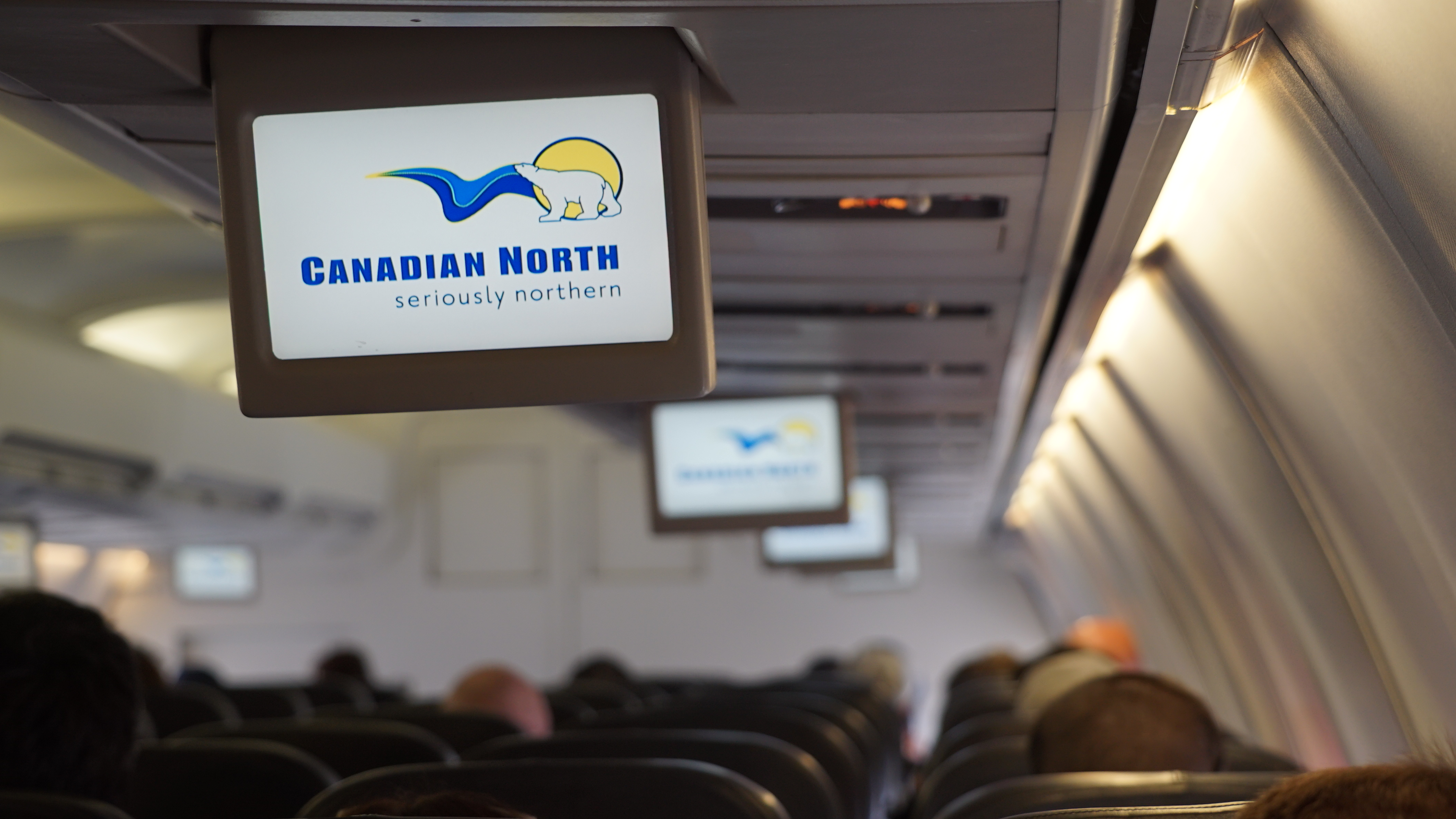
In-flight entertainment video displays on a Canadian North flight

Canadian North in-flight service includes leather seating, advanced seat selection, free newspapers and magazines, and free colouring books and crayons for children.

The airline offers Aeroplan rewards points, both to collect and to redeem. Passengers may redeem Air Miles points for travel on Canadian North. Canadian North has codeshare agreements with Air North and Calm Air.

Canadian North also has its own "Aurora Concierge" and Aurora Rewards program for frequent travellers. Benefits of being an Aurora Concierge member include: Priority check-in, baggage, and boarding, extra piece of checked luggage, free alcoholic beverages, no fee changes, personalized membership card and baggage tag, and more.

In 2005, the airline started offering a Pivut Fare ("ours") to beneficiaries of the Inuvialuit Final Agreement, part of the Inuvialuit Settlement Region.
