= Grise Fiord Airport =

Aerodrome in Nunavut, Canada

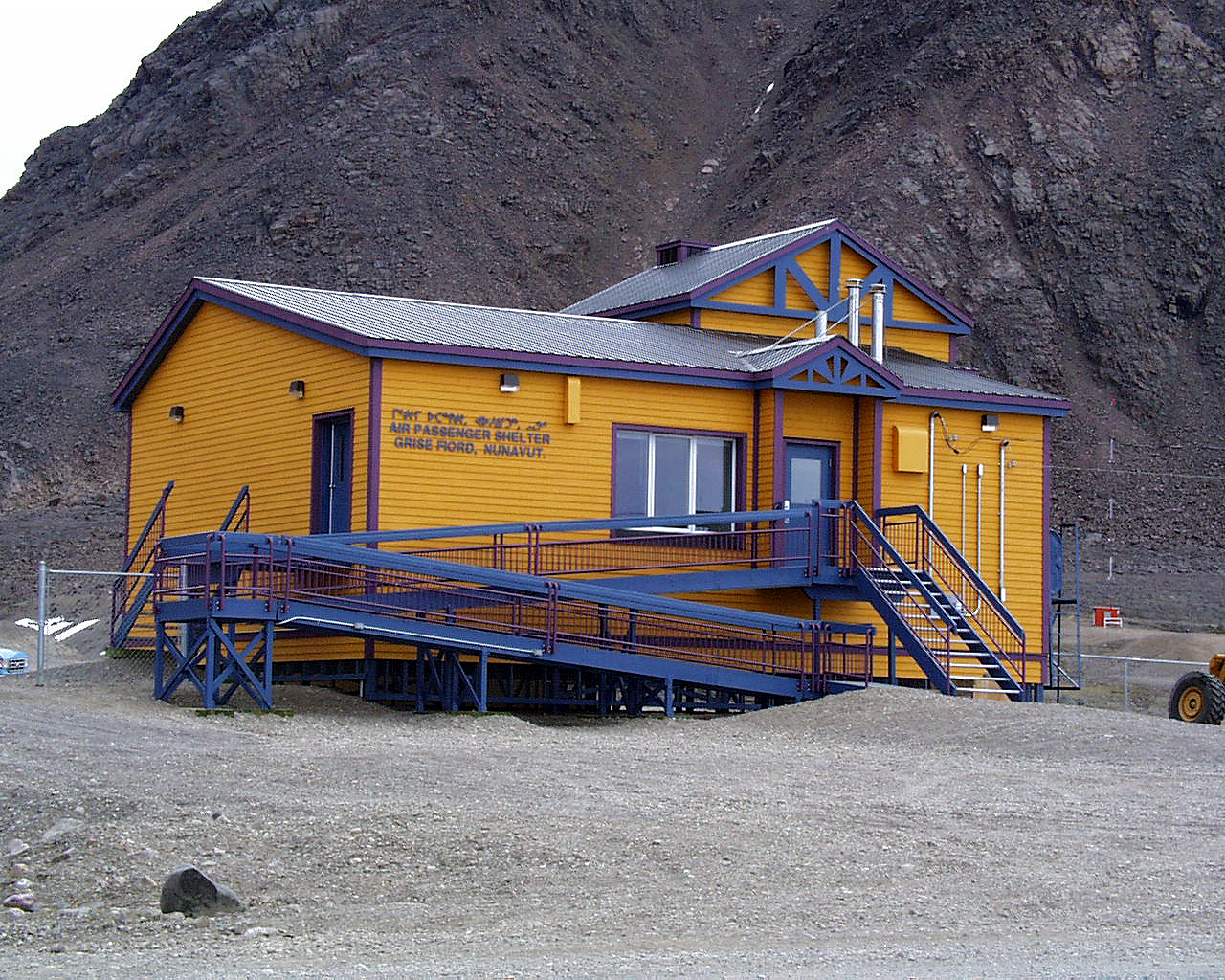
- IATA: YGZ; ICAO: CYGZ; WMO: 71971

Summary
- Airport type: Public
- Operator: Government of Nunavut
- Location: Grise Fiord, Nunavut
- Time zone: EST (UTC−05:00)
  - Summer (DST): EDT (UTC−04:00)
- Elevation AMSL: 135 ft / 41 m
- Coordinates: 76°25′33″N 082°54′29″W

Map
- Location in Nunavut

Runways
Direction	Length		Surface
Direction	ft	m	Surface
14/32	1,675	511	Gravel

Statistics (2010)
- Aircraft movements: 190
- Sources: Canada Flight Supplement; Environment Canada; Movements from Statistics Canada.

Grise Fiord Airport (IATA: YGZ, ICAO: CYGZ) is located in Grise Fiord, Nunavut, Canada, and is operated by the Government of Nunavut. All scheduled flights to Grise Fiord are operated by Canadian North. Flights to the airport are usually from Resolute Bay Airport, with most of them only carrying cargo with few to no passengers. There is an airport terminal building located at the airport.

== Airlines and destinations ==
Airlines	Destinations
Canadian North	Resolute

== Gallery ==
Grise Fiord Airport
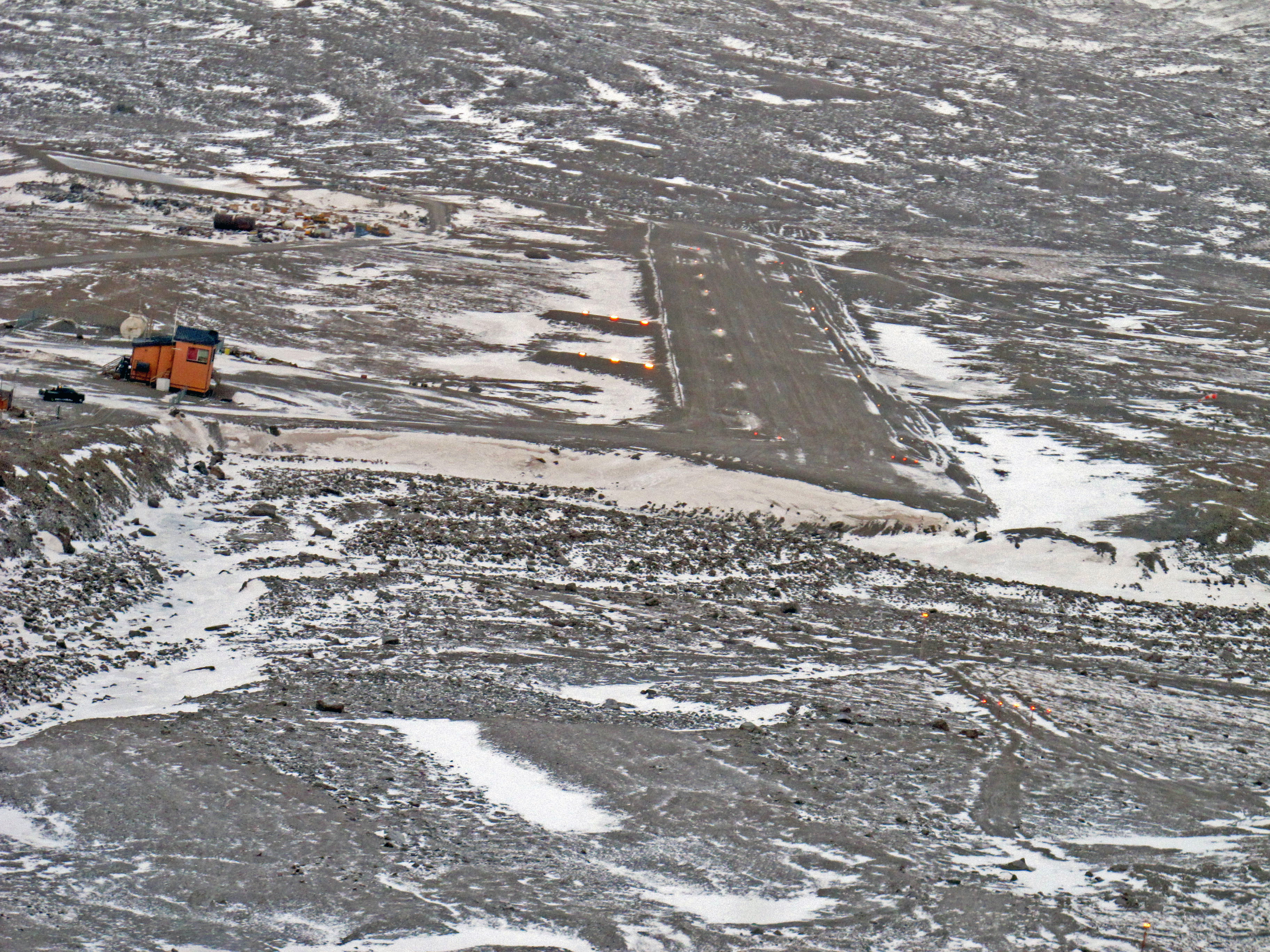
Final runway 32

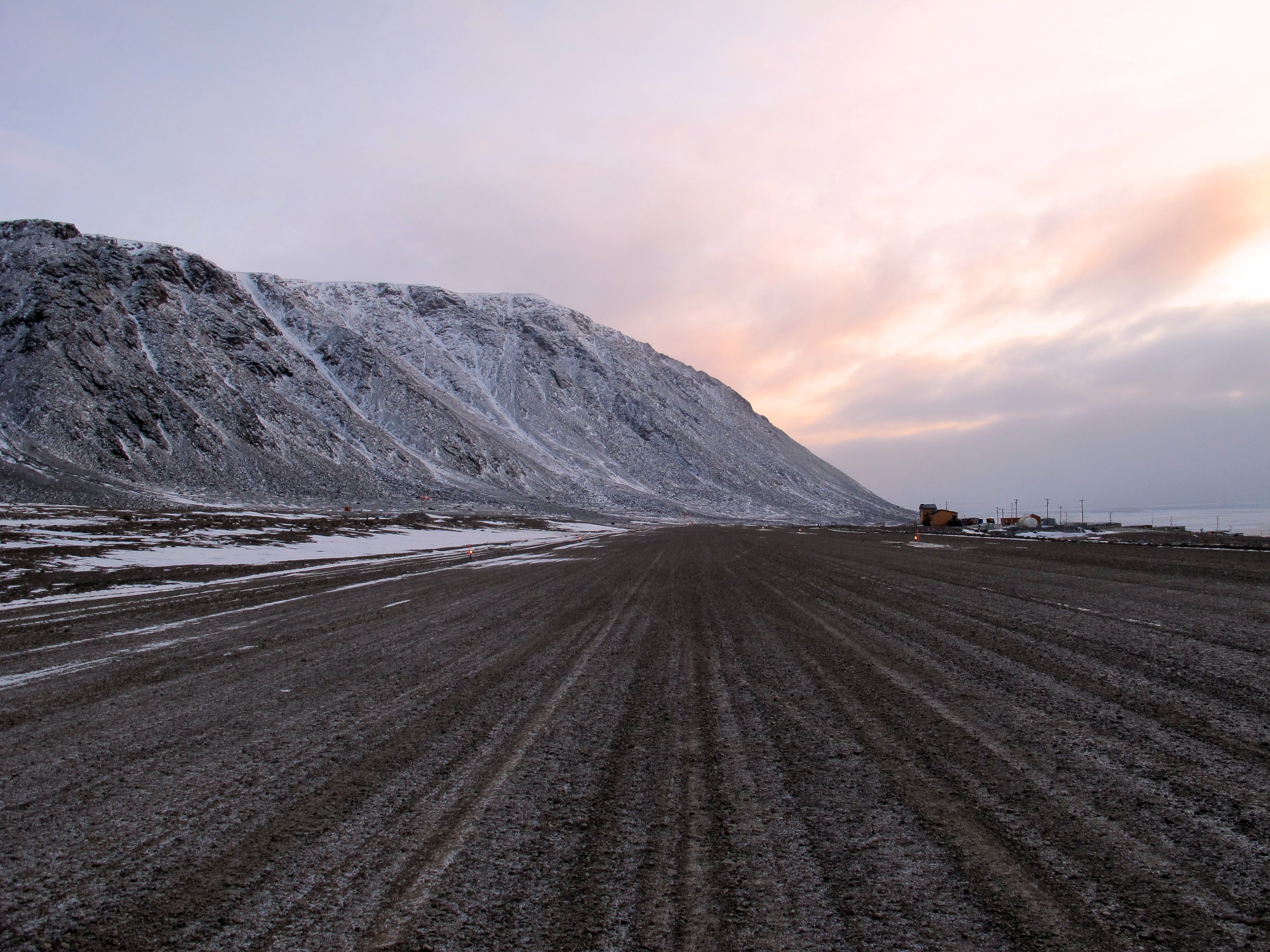
Runway 14

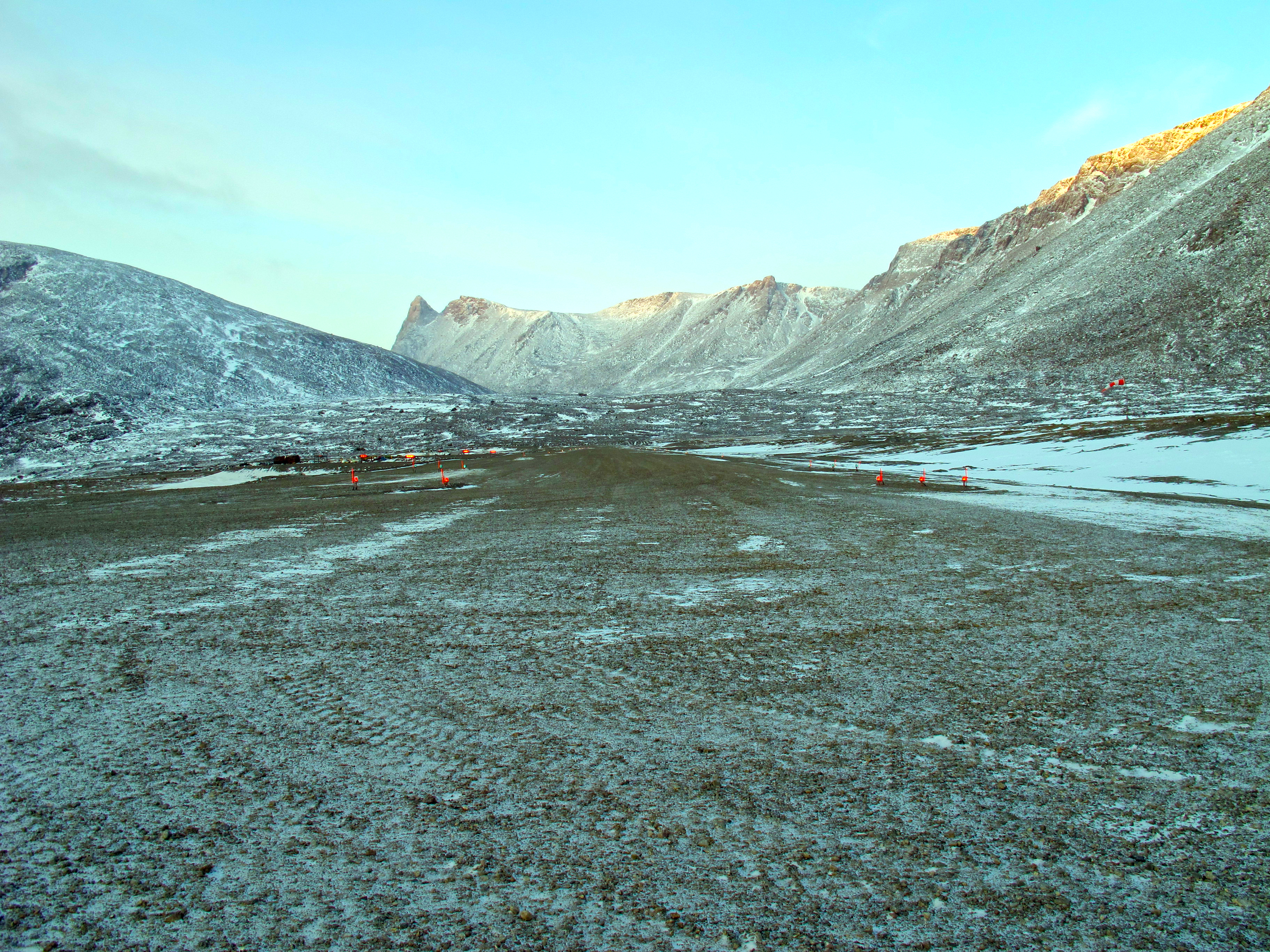
Runway 32

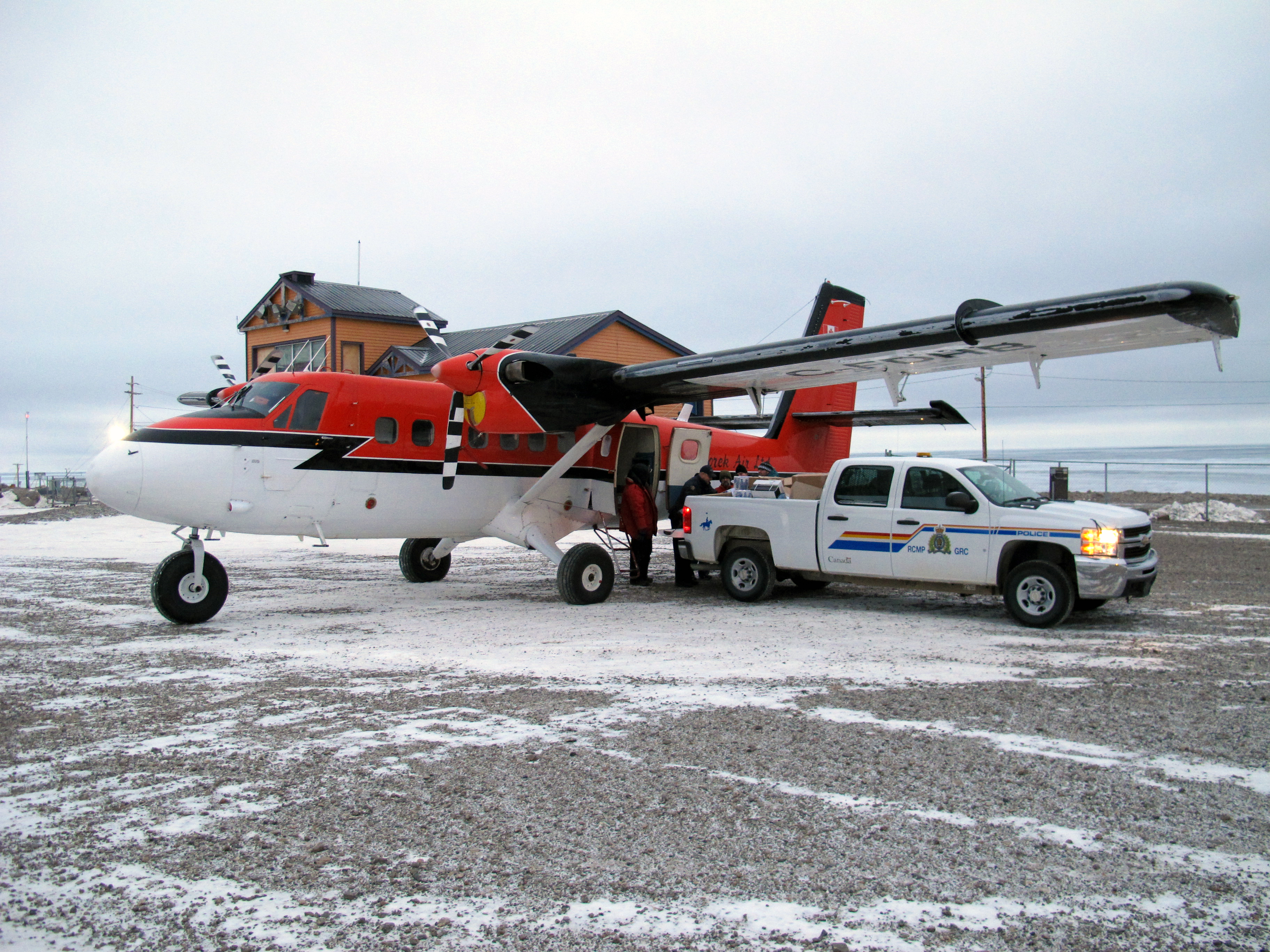
A Twin Otter belonging to Kenn Borek Air
