= Gravel kit =

Modification on an aircraft

External images
- A Canadian North Boeing 737 fitted with a gravelkit
- A First Air Boeing 737 fitted with a gravelkit
- An Alaska Air Boeing 737 fitted with a gravelkit

A gravel kit is a modification on an aircraft to avoid foreign object debris (FOD) damage or ingestion while operating on unpaved surfaces. Modifications generally include methods of preventing the nose gear spraying FOD into the engine and onto the underside of the fuselage or wings, and methods of preventing each engine from ingesting FOD from the ground directly in front of it.

The most notable application of this upgrade is the Boeing 737-200, which includes a gravel deflector (similar in appearance to a wide ski) mounted to the nose wheel, and vortex dissipators, using compressor bleed air, in front of each engine. This modification was used by Alaska Airlines for many years, and is still employed by Air Inuit, Canadian North, Air North, Nolinor Aviation in northern Canada. Some Boeing 727s were also fitted with specific gravel kits on the nose wheel, while the rest were fitted with devices in the form of smaller deflectors than those used on the 737, used on all wheels, to deflect FOD away so as to prevent the rear-mounted engines from ingesting FOD from a runway. Another rear-engined aircraft—the McDonnell Douglas DC-9/MD-80/MD-90 and Boeing 717 series—uses deflectors similar to those of the conventionally-equipped 727 on all their aircraft's landing gear to prevent FOD structural damage and ingestion. A gravel kit could also be fitted to BAe 146 aircraft.

== Gallery ==
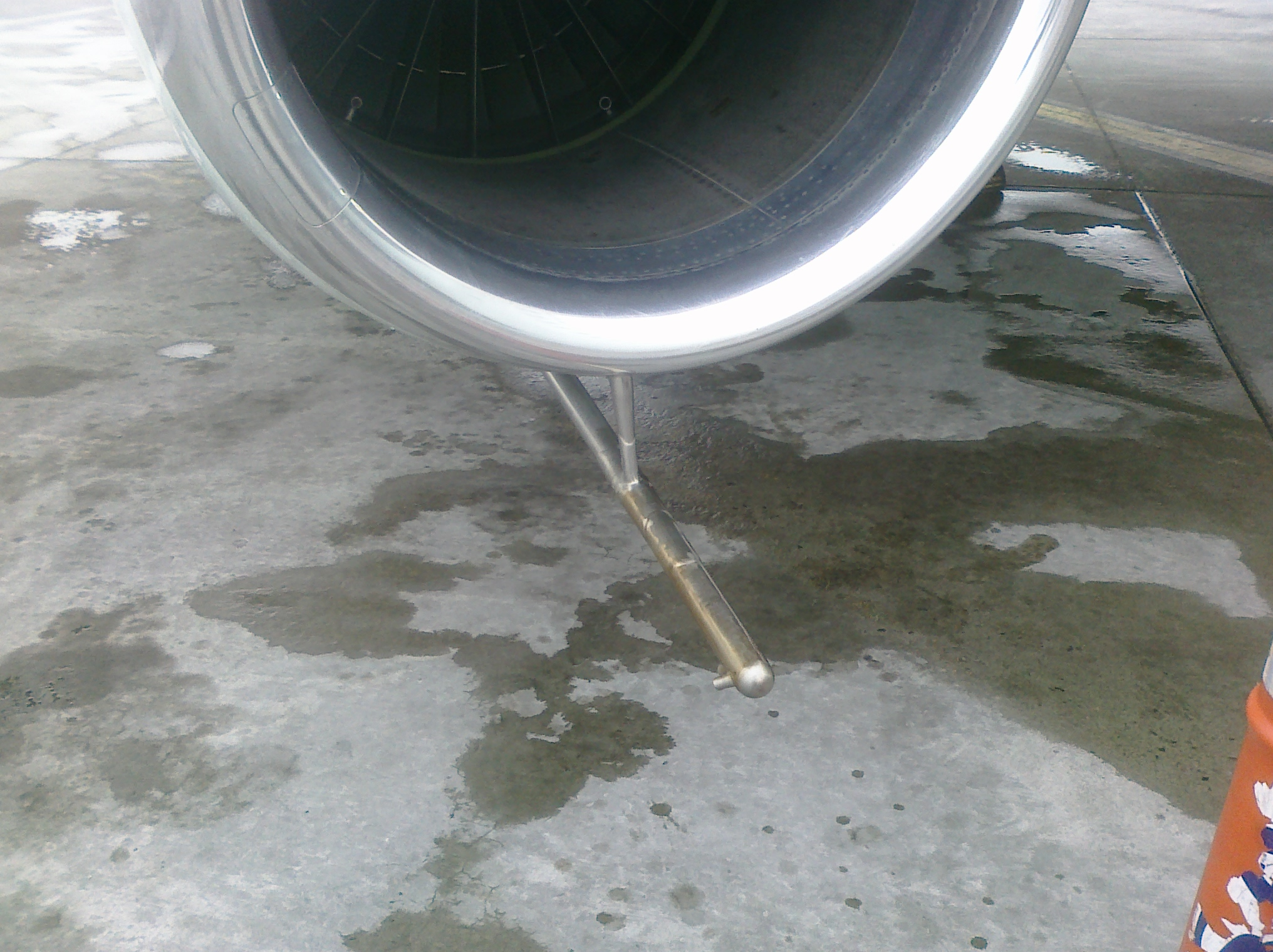
Canadian North 737-200 engine gravel kit vortex dissipator

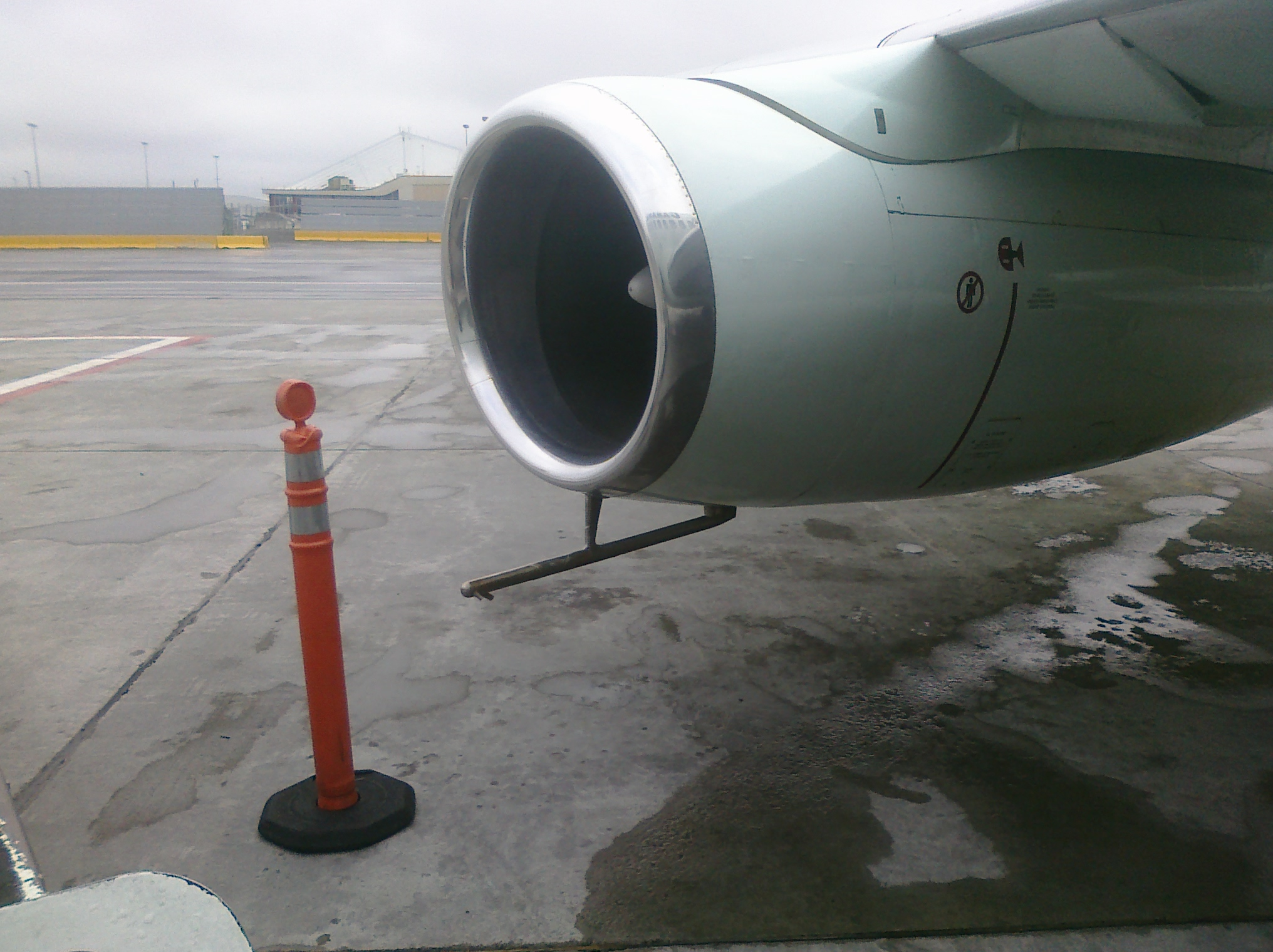
Canadian North 737-200 engine gravel kit vortex dissipator in profile view

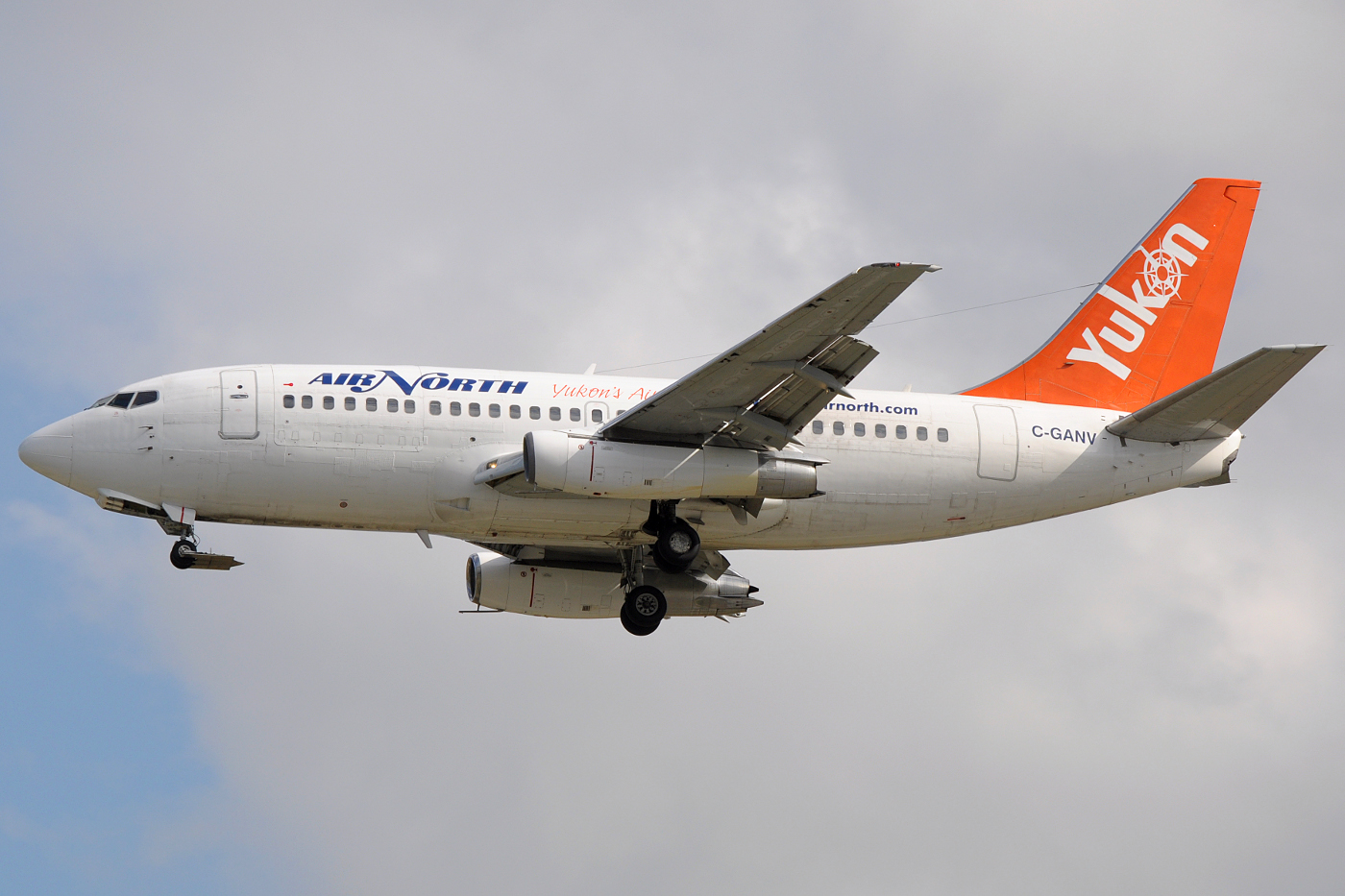
Gravel kit on a landing Air North 737-200

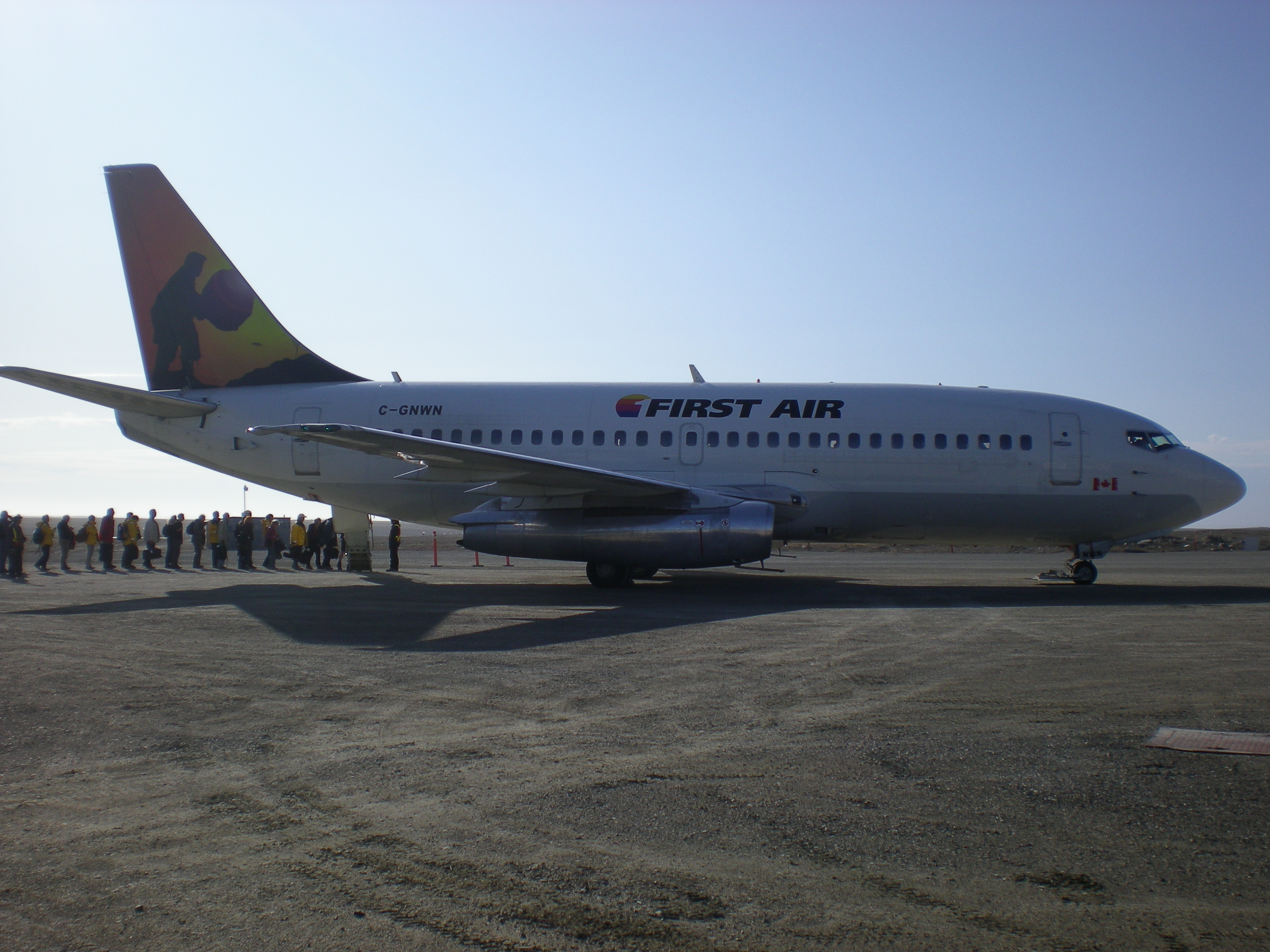
Gravel kit on a First Air 737-200

== See also ==
- Index of aviation articles
- Rough-field capability
