= List of airlines of Nunavut =

This is a list of airlines of Nunavut which have an air operator's certificate issued by Transport Canada, the country's civil aviation authority.

== Current airlines ==
Airline	Image	IATA	ICAO	Callsign	Hub airport(s) or headquarters	Notes
Adlair Aviation					Cambridge Bay	Charters. Registered with the Nunavummi Nangminiqaqtunik Ikajuuti Policy.
Air Nunavut			BFF	AIR BAFFIN	Iqaluit	Charters and MEDIVAC (air ambulance) only. Registered with the Nunavummi Nangminiqaqtunik Ikajuuti Policy and with Nunavut Tunngavik Incorporated as an Inuit firm.
Aqsaqniq Airways			DA	DISCOVERY AIR	Cambridge Bay	MEDIVAC (air ambulance) only. Partnership with Air Tindi (minority partner), a subsidiary of Discovery Air. Headquarters are in Taloyoak.
DAL Aviation					Cambridge Bay Water	Seasonal floatplane charters.
Keewatin Air		FK	KEW		Rankin Inlet, Winnipeg	Charters and MEDIVAC (air ambulance) only.
Kitikmeot Air					Cambridge Bay	Charters. Registered with the Nunavummi Nangminiqaqtunik Ikajuuti Policy and with Nunavut Tunngavik Incorporated as an Inuit firm.
Kitikmeot Helicopters					Cambridge Bay	Helicopter charters. The company is a joint venture between Bill and Jessie Lyall (51%) and Great Slave Helicopters (48%). Registered with the Nunavummi Nangminiqaqtunik Ikajuuti Policy and with Nunavut Tunngavik Incorporated as an Inuit firm.
Nunasi Helicopters					Yellowknife, Iqaluit	Helicopter charters. Registered with the Nunavummi Nangminiqaqtunik Ikajuuti Policy and with Nunavut Tunngavik Incorporated as an Inuit firm.
Ookpik Aviation					Baker Lake	Charters.
Unaalik Aviation					Resolute Bay	Scheduled passenger service to 5 destinations in Nunavut. Registered with the Nunavummi Nangminiqaqtunik Ikajuuti Policy, with bases in Cambridge Bay and Iqaluit.

== Defunct airlines ==
Airline	Image	IATA	ICAO	Callsign	Hub airport(s) or headquarters	Notes
Air Baffin			BFF	AIR BAFFIN	Iqaluit	1990 - 1997, now Air Nunavut

== Other ==
Airline	Image	IATA	ICAO	Callsign	Hub airport(s)	Notes
Calm Air		MO	CAV	CALM AIR	Thompson, Winnipeg James Armstrong Richardson	Serves 7 destinations in Nunavut with a secondary hub at Rankin Inlet Airport.
Canadian North	de Havilland Canada DHC-8 Dash 8	5T	MPE	EMPRESS	Yellowknife	Serves 14 destinations in Nunavut.
Kivalliq Air		FK			Winnipeg James Armstrong Richardson	Serves 8 destinations in Nunavut.
