= Discovery Air =

Canadian airline

- Industry: Specialized aviation
- Founded: 2004
- Founder: David Taylor 2004–2008
- Defunct: 2018
- Fate: Bankruptcy
- Headquarters: Toronto, Canada
- Key people: Jacob (Koby) Shavit, President and CEO; Paul Bernards, CFO

Discovery Air (DA), founded in 2004, was a specialized aviation company that operated primarily in Canada.

== History ==
=== Acquisitions and growth ===
In 2004, Discovery Air was created by David Taylor. It was incorporated by the Pacific & Western Bank of Canada, whose CEO and president was David Taylor. In December of the same year, Discovery Air acquired 50% of Hicks & Lawrence, later renamed "Discovery Air Fire Services", with the other 50% being acquired in 2005.

In April 2006, Discovery Air completed an initial public offering of $3.85 million. Discovery Air then purchased Great Slave Helicopters (GSH) in June 2006, Air Tindi in December 2006, the Wheel Division Assets of Walsten Air Service (through its subsidiary Hicks and Lawrence) in March 2007, Top Aces (later renamed Discovery Air Defence Services) in August 2007, and Discovery Mining Services in January 2008.

In 2008, David Taylor stated, "When we were ousted from the board and management, the wonderful business that we had created was promptly destroyed by the incompetent new board and management creating significant hardship for Discovery Air's loyal employees and wiping-out shareholder value." In September 2008, Discovery Air Announced a new interim chief executive officer.

In January 2009, Discovery Air received a Can$34 million loan from the Government of the NWT, which had been repaid by 2012.

In November 2009, Discovery Air announced appointment of financial officers.

In October 2010, Discovery Air started operations at Discovery Air Technical Services. In 2011, Discovery Air announced the opening of a new business unit, Discovery Air Innovations, which signed a provisional deal with Hybrid Air Vehicles to purchase hybrid airships for use in Northern Canada. The deal, which the companies hoped to have finalised by 2012, and could have involved up to 45 airships at $40 million per craft, with the first being delivered in 2014. In 2011, Discovery Air Fire Services announced the launch of a new subsidiary, Discovery Aviation Academy. On 8 August 2012, it was announced that Discovery Air had let the deal with Hybrid Air Vehicles lapse as they no longer wished to purchase the vehicles.

In 2012, Great Slave Helicopters acquired Servicios Aéreos Helicopters in Chile, which became Helicopters.cl SpA after the sale, and Great Slave Helicopters acquired Northern Air Support. In 2013, Discovery Air acquired Advanced Training Systems International Inc.

=== Debts and bankruptcy ===
In 2012, the company announced layoffs for its subsidiary Air Tindi.

In 2016, Premier Aviation completed purchase of Discovery Air Technical Services.

In 2017, Discovery Air completed the sale of Discovery Air Fire Services.

In 2017, Discovery Air completed a privatization transaction.

In December 2017, after Discovery Air Defence Services had a reorganized standalone financing plan laid out, two directors of Discovery Air left to become directors of Discovery Air Defence Services. Discovery Air Defence was acquired by the Clearvest investment firm through a questionable deal where cleared debts in return for shares in DA Defence, but without going through the approval process which should include all debt covenants. This led to a shareholders' debacle that precipitated the company's imminent bankruptcy. A group of investors was created to block Clearvest's progress in buying out Discovery Air's assets.

In March 2018, after declaring a bankruptcy for a $149 million debt, Discovery Air was granted creditor protection under the federal Companies' Creditors Arrangement Act. The Clairvest Group, the largest creditor of Discovery Air ($72.7 million) offered to acquire Air Tindi, Great Slave Helicopters and Discovery Mining Services Ltd. In April 2018, the court processed a sale solicitation process concerning Air Tindi, Great Slave Helicopters and Discovery Mining Services Ltd. On 27 April 2018, Discovery Air was delisted from the Toronto Stock Exchange.

In September 2018, Great Slave Helicopters, after obtaining a creditor's protection from Ontario Superior Court of Justice, initiated a restructuration program to prepare for its sale. In November 2018, Great Slave Helicopters was sold to Great Slave Helicopters 2018 Ltd. (formerly known as 11088211 Canada Corp), owned by Pat Campling Jr, a former interim CEO of West Wind Aviation.

== Description ==
Through its subsidiary companies, Discovery Air provided aviation and aviation related services for corporate customers, and for the federal and provincial governments of Canada. Discovery Air operated units provide fixed-wing and rotary-wing services, and logistics and remote operations management services. This included cargo and passenger air charter services throughout Canada, vital medivac air services in the north, and utility flying for mining exploration.

The Northern Services segment consisted of three operating units: Great Slave Helicopters (GSHL or GSH), Air Tindi ("Tindi") and Discovery Mining Services (DMS). Together, these had a customer base servicing companies and government entities in the business of mineral, base and precious metal exploration and production, wildlife services, forest fire suppression, oil and gas exploration, power line construction and maintenance, aerial surveys, seismic, air ambulance, scheduled charters and tourism.

== Operating units and fleet ==
=== Great Slave Helicopters ===
Founded in 1984, Great Slave Helicopters is a VFR and IFR helicopter operator in Canada with 64 helicopters in its fleet. It provided, alone and along with several First Nations and Inuit groups in the Northwest Territories and Nunavut, scheduled and chartered passenger and air cargo services to private sector companies and governments. Under the name Northlinx, Great Slave Helicopters had partnerships with Akaitcho Helicopters, Dehcho Regional Helicopters, Denendeh Helicopters, (49%, Evergreen Forestry Management has 51%), Gwich'in Helicopters, Havgun Helicopters, Hudson Bay Helicopters (100%), K'ahsho Got'ine Helicopters (majority First Nations owned), Kitikmeot Helicopters (49%, Bill and Jessie Lyall own 51% ) Kivallingmiut/Kivalliq Aviation (majority Inuit owned, Air Tindi is also a minority share holder), Sahtu Helicopters (49%, various land corporations have 51%), Superior Helicopters and Tlicho Helicopters. As per the Civil Aircraft Register, the Great Slave fleet consists of 64 helicopters. The Great Slave website also listed the Bell 407 that is not shown in the Transport Canada registration list. Numbers correct as of January 4, 2013:

Great Slave Helicopters fleet
| Aircraft | No. of aircraft | Variants | Notes |
|---|---|---|---|
| Astar 350 | 23 | AS350 B2, AS350 B3, AS350 BA | |
| Bell 205 | 6 | 205-A1, 205B | The Great Slave Helicopters website lists 205A1++ |
| Bell 206 | 24 | 206B, 206L, 206L-1, 206L-3, 206L-4 | The 206L-1 is not listed at the Great Slave Helicopters website. |
| Bell 212 | 9 | 212 Single, 212/212HP | |
| Bell 412 | 1 | 412EP | |
| Eurocopter EC130 | 1 | EC130 B4 | |

=== Air Tindi ===
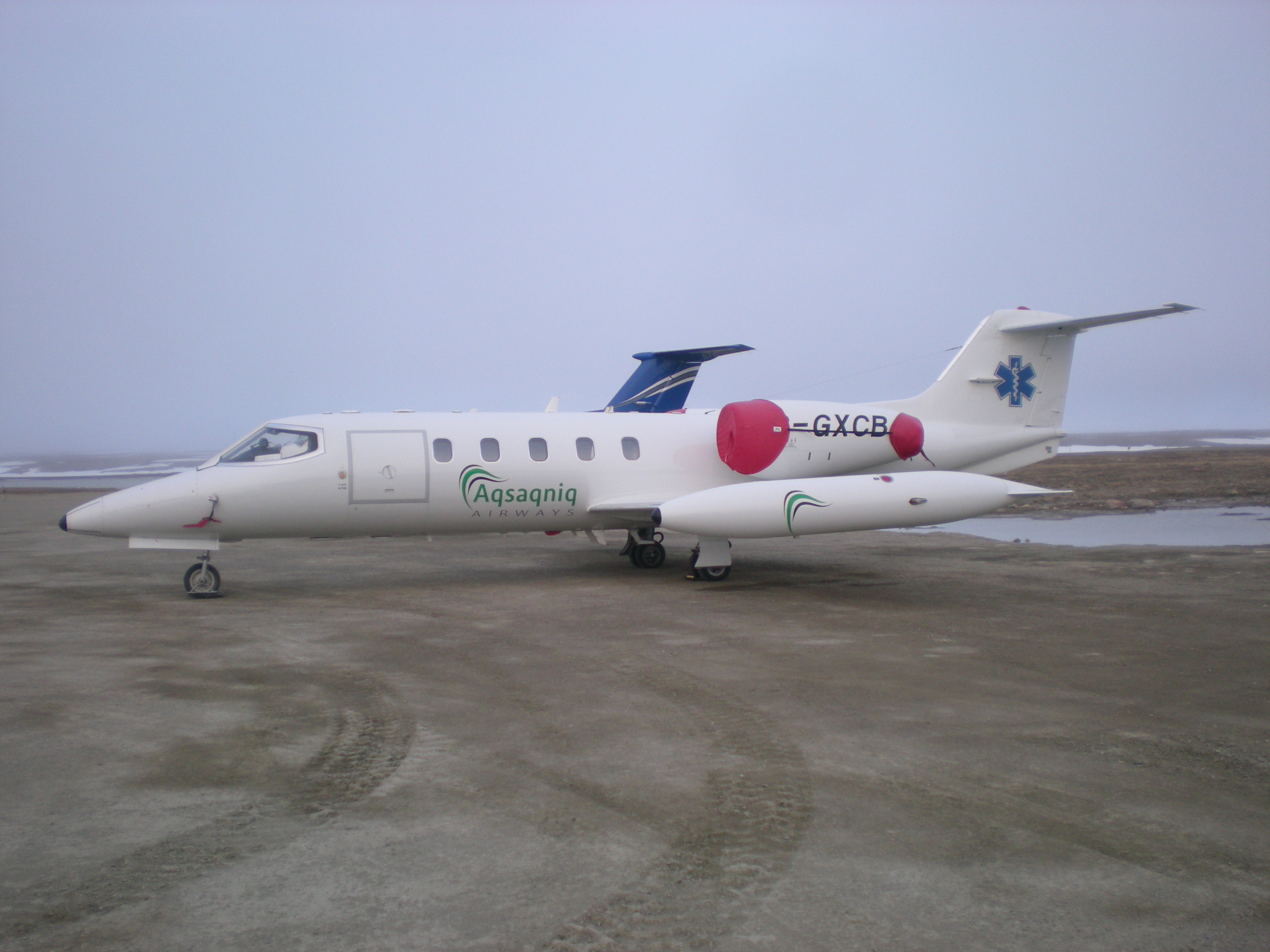
Aqsaqniq Airways, registered to Air Tindi, at Cambridge Bay Airport

Air Tindi, founded in 1988, was a charter airline based in Yellowknife, NT. With their main base as the Yellowknife Airport, the company provided scheduled and on demand charter services throughout Northern and Western Canada. With 24 fixed-wing aircraft in their fleet, they are capable of transporting 46 passengers or 10,000 pounds of cargo. Tindi had the largest medivac fleet in Northern Canada. As of January 2016, Air Tindi had the following 27 aircraft registered with Transport Canada and listed with Air Tindi:

Air Tindi fleet
| Aircraft | No. of aircraft (TC list) | No. of aircraft (AT list) | Variants | Notes |
|---|---|---|---|---|
| Beechcraft Super King Air | 11 | N/A | Model 200, Model 200C, Model 300 | Listed on the Air Tindi site as 200 Catpass, B-200C and 350 |
| Cessna 208 | 4 | N/A | 208 Caravan, 208B Grand Caravan | 7 and 9 passengers |
| de Havilland Canada DHC-3 Otter | 1 | 0 | | Not listed at the Air Tindi website |
| de Havilland Canada DHC-6 Twin Otter | 5 | N/A | Series 300 | 19 passengers |
| Dash 7 | 5 | N/A | DHC-7-102, DHC-7-103 | Combi aircraft, 46 passengers |
| Learjet 35 | 1 | N/A | | 7 - 8 passengers |

=== Northern Air Support ===
Great Slave Helicopters acquired Northern Air Support on February 21, 2012, which is based in Kelowna, British Columbia with a base in Rocky Mountain House, Alberta. As per the Civil Aircraft Register, the Northern Air Support fleet consists of 10 aircraft. Numbers correct as of January 4, 2013:

Northern Air Support fleet
| Aircraft | No. of aircraft | Variants | Notes |
|---|---|---|---|
| Astar 350 | 4 | AS350 B2 | |
| Bell 206 | 2 | 206B | |
| Bell 407 | 3 | | |
| MD 500 | 1 | | Listed by Transport Canada as Hughes 369D |

=== Discovery Mining Services ===
Founded in 1991, Discovery Mining Services is a NWT-based company that provides remote exploration camps, expediting, logistics and staking services to primarily diamond and mineral exploration companies.

== Hawk One ==
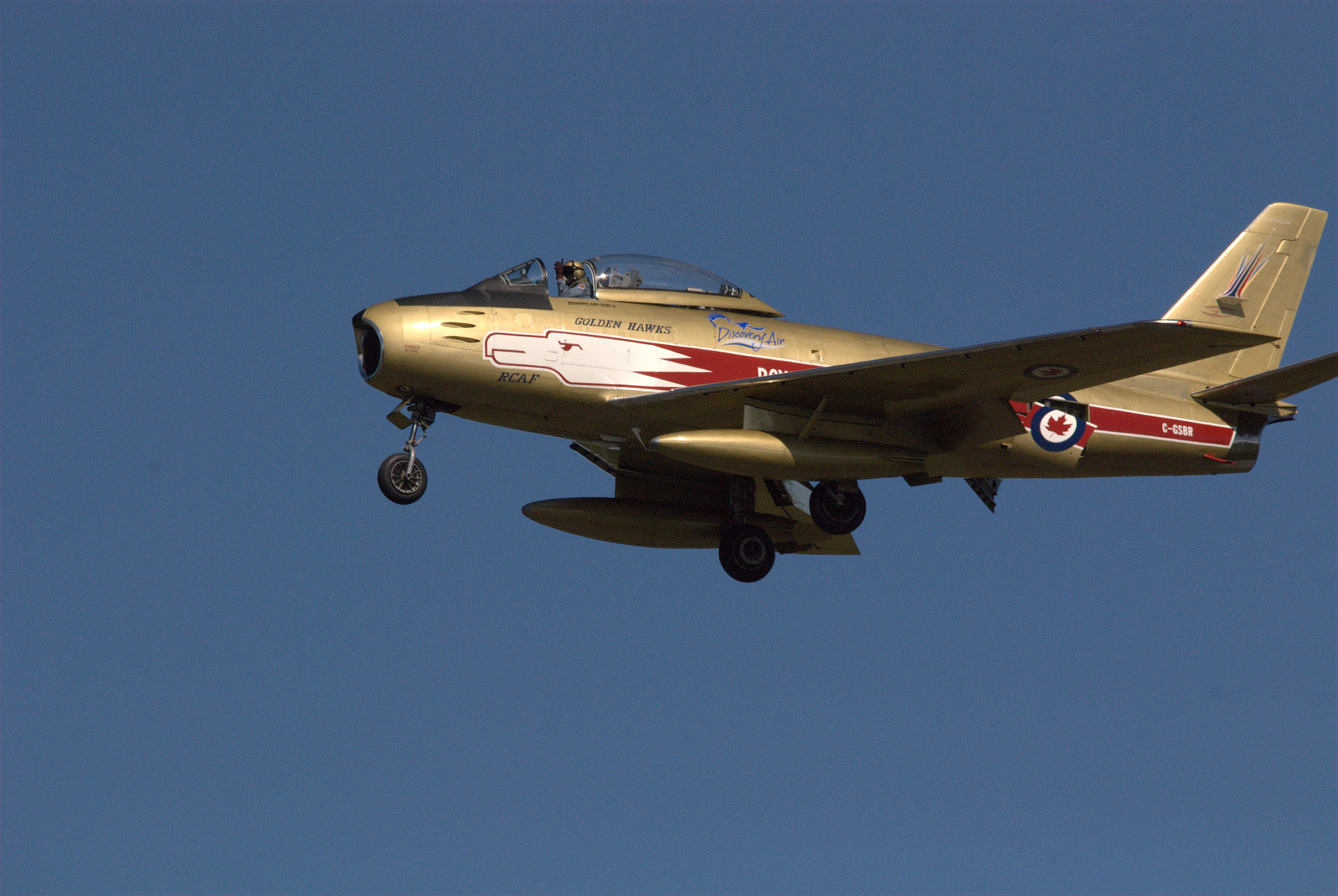
Discovery Air "Hawk One" Sabre over Gatineau Executive Airport

Hawk One, officially Discovery Air Hawk One, is a Canadair Sabre owned by Vintage Wings of Canada that, in partnership with Discovery Air and the Department of National Defence has been refurbished. The aircraft, a Mk.5, was given an Orenda 14 engine and wings with leading-edge slats, making it closer to a Mk.6, and has been painted in the colours of the Golden Hawks. Hawk One, which tours Canada with the Snowbirds, has been flown on several occasions by astronaut Chris Hadfield.

== Destination ==
- Discovery Air Head Office - Toronto, Ontario, Canada
- Great Slave Helicopters - Kapuskasing • Dryden • Churchill • Calgary • Rankin Inlet • Fort Simpson • Cambridge Bay • Inuvik • Norman Wells • Fort Liard • Hay River • Yellowknife
- Air Tindi - Fort Simpson • Yellowknife • Cambridge Bay
- Discovery Mining Services - Yellowknife • Nunavut

== See also ==
- List of defunct airlines of Canada
