= Fern Villeneuve =

Canadian aviator (1927–2019)

Joseph Gerard Fernand Villeneuve
- Born: 2 July 1927; Buckingham, Quebec, Canada
- Died: 25 December 2019 (aged 92)
- Military career
- Allegiance: Canada
- Branch: Royal Canadian Air Force; Canadian Armed Forces
- Service years: 1950–1982
- Rank: Lieutenant Colonel
- Nickname: "Fern"
- Commands: Golden Hawks
- Awards: RCAF Air Force Cross; Canadian Aviation Hall of Fame

Lt. Col (Ret.) Joseph Armand Gerard Fernand Villeneuve (2 July 1927 – 25 December 2019) was a Canadian aviator who joined the Royal Canadian Air Force (RCAF) in 1950 and was the first leader of the RCAF's Golden Hawks aerobatic team. He flew for 32 years as a military jet fighter pilot Villeneuve was inducted into the Canadian Aviation Hall of Fame in 2006.

== Aviation career ==
Villeneuve was born in Buckingham, Quebec (now Gatineau, Quebec). He learned to fly as a civilian in a Piper J-3 Cub. In 1946 he obtained his Canadian Private Pilot Licence, and in 1948, he went on to acquire his Canadian Commercial Pilot Licence. In 1950, Villeneuve joined the RCAF in which he had a long and distinguished career as a fighter pilot. He flew the Harvard propeller trainer, the North American P-51 Mustang Second World War piston fighter, and several fighter jets over the decades: Canadair CT-133 Silver Star, de Havilland DH.100 Vampire, Canadair Sabre, Avro Canada CF-100 Canuck, McDonnell CF-101 Voodoo, and the Mach 2+ Canadair CF-104 Starfighter. Villeneuve was a squadron leader three different times, on the CF-104, T-33 and CF-101. He retired as a Lieutenant-Colonel in 1982, having logged more than 13,000 hours.

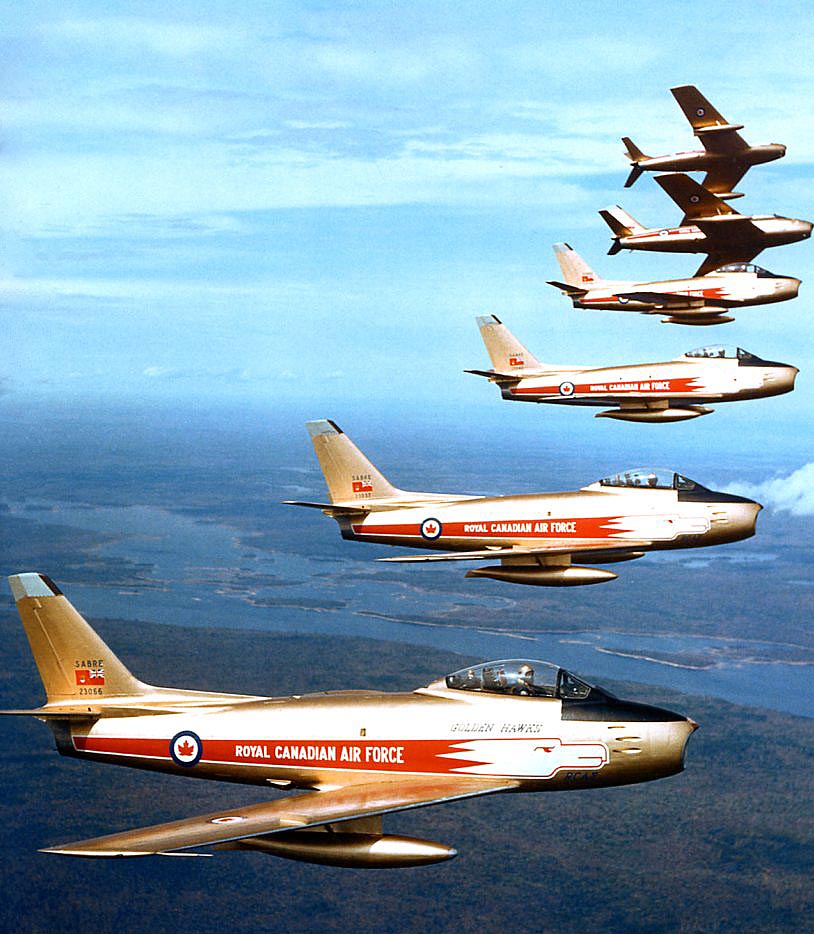
The Golden Hawks air demonstration team

=== Golden Hawks ===
The "Golden Hawks" were a Canadian military aerobatic flying team established in 1959 to celebrate the 35th anniversary or the Royal Canadian Air Force (RCAF) and the "Golden" 50th anniversary of Canadian flight. Initially a six-plane team was envisioned as performing for only one year with the Canadair Sabre 5, but the Golden Hawks were so popular after their 1959 show season that the team was re-established for 1960, under the command of W/C Jack Allan with Villeneuve flying as the lead pilot with the team.

Villeneuve yielded the lead position to F/L Jim McCombe for the 1961 season. He had to leave the team when he married, as there was a rune that married men could serve the team for only two years. He then went on to Training Command. Villeneuve was awarded the rare RCAF Air Force Cross for his skillful piloting of a disabled F-86 Sabre in 1960.

=== Later career ===
Villeneuve joined the reserve force of the Canadian Forces in 1983, becoming Regional Cadet Air Operations Officer for Central Region. He served as commanding officer of Central Region Gliding School from 1984 to 1987, and remained in uniform as a tow pilot and gliding instructor until 1992. Following his retirement, he continued flying with the Air Cadet Gliding Program as a civilian instructor for a further ten years.

Villeneuve was the Honorary Team Leader of the "Hawk One" F-86 Sabre project at Vintage Wings of Canada in Gatineau, Quebec from 2009-2013. In 2012 he was still flying his civilian Globe Swift with the registration C-GLYN, 66 years after he first soloed in 1946.

== Honours and recognition ==
Villeneuve was awarded the RCAF Air Force Cross on 20 May 1961 for an engine-out landing of a Canadair F-86 Sabre. In 1997 he became one of two living people to have their image on Canadian coins, the other being the Queen. Villeneuve was inducted into the Canadian Aviation Hall of Fame in 2006, he was appointed as Honorary Colonel of 8 Air Maintenance Squadron in Trenton, Ontario, from 2008 to 2012 and in 2015 was inducted as an Honorary Snowbird by 431 (AD) Squadron, the Snowbirds in Moose Jaw, SK. .
