= Financeit =

Canadian financial technology company

- Type: Private
- Industry: Financial technology
- Founded: 2011; 15 years ago
- Founders: Michael Garrity, Casper Wong, Paul Sehr
- Headquarters: Toronto, Ontario, Canada
- Key people: Casper Wong (CEO)
- Products: Installment plans, buy now, pay later plans, loans
- Website: www.financeit.io

Financeit is a Canadian financial technology company based in Toronto, Ontario. Founded in 2011, it provides point-of-sale financing services to merchants in sectors such as home improvement, retail, and recreational vehicles. The company facilitates installment payment plans for consumers and manages loan origination, funding, and servicing.

== History ==
CommunityLend was launched by Michael Garrity in 2007 as a peer-to-peer lending platform. In 2011, the business shifted its focus to point-of-sale consumer financing under the name Financeit, operating as a subsidiary of CommunityLend Holdings Inc. In 2013, Financeit raised approximately CAD $13 million in a Series A funding round. In 2015, Goldman Sachs invested in the company through its merchant banking division, acquiring a minority stake.

In 2016, Financeit secured an additional CAD $17 million in equity financing from new and existing investors. That year, it partnered with Concentra Bank to acquire the indirect home improvement financing portfolio of TD Bank Group, which included around 45,000 loans and approximately 800 merchant dealers, representing a total book value of roughly CAD $339 million.

In 2017, Goldman Sachs increased its investment, becoming the majority owner of Financeit.

Later that year, Financeit acquired Centah Inc., a provider of customer relationship management software for the home improvement industry. By 2019, the company's cumulative loan originations reached CAD $2 billion.

In 2021, Financeit reported that cumulative loan originations had surpassed CAD $2 billion.

In February 2022, Financeit was acquired by Wafra Capital Partners, an investment firm based in New York and affiliated with Kuwait’s sovereign wealth fund, purchasing the company from Goldman Sachs Asset Management. Although the transaction amount was not officially disclosed, media reports estimated it at between USD $350 million and $500 million.

In February 2023, Casper Wong, co-founder of Financeit, was appointed Chief Executive Officer (CEO), succeeding Michael Garrity. In June 2023, the company acquired the consumer loan businesses of the Simply Group, including Simply Group Financial, SNAP Home Finance, and certain assets of EcoHome Financial, representing over CAD $1.5 billion in assets.

In July 2024, Financeit launched a direct-to-consumer personal loan program aimed at home improvement financing. In October 2024, the company announced a $200 million expansion of its securitization warehouse with Goldman Sachs, joining existing securitization lenders CIBC and Equitable Bank, ultimately increasing its capacity to a total of CAD $700 million. Later in 2024, Financeit obtained an additional CAD $500 million securitization facility, bringing its total financing capacity to more than CAD $2 billion. In total the company has almost $2.5 billion in funding capacity to fuel the growth of its rapidly growing home improvement financing business.

In 2025, Financeit announced a partnership with Charge Solar to introduce a nationwide financing program for residential solar installations in Canada.

In June 2026, Financeit completed a C$201 million term asset-backed securitization (ABS) transaction. Issued through Financeit Securitization Limited Partnership, the Series 2026-1 notes were backed by consumer home improvement loans and rated by Morningstar DBRS. The transaction expanded the company's annual funding capacity to approximately C$2.5 billion.

== Operations ==
Financeit's platform allows merchants to provide financing options to customers during purchase. The company administers the associated loan origination, funding, and servicing processes. Its lending activities utilize financing facilities from institutions including the VersaBank, Equitable Bank, Sunlife Financial, Bank of Montreal, CIBC and Goldman Sachs.
