= CYCB =

CYCB may refer to:

- CYCB the ICAO code for Cambridge Bay Airport.
- CycB, a cyclin protein.
