= Jim McCombe =

James David McCombe
- Nickname: "Jim"
- Born: 10 July 1932; Summerside, Prince Edward Island, Canada
- Died: 7 January 2011 (aged 78) Halifax, Nova Scotia
- Allegiance: Canada
- Branch: Royal Canadian Air Force
- Service years: 1951–1974
- Rank: Major
- Commands: Golden Hawks
- Other work: Inspector, Chief Pilot

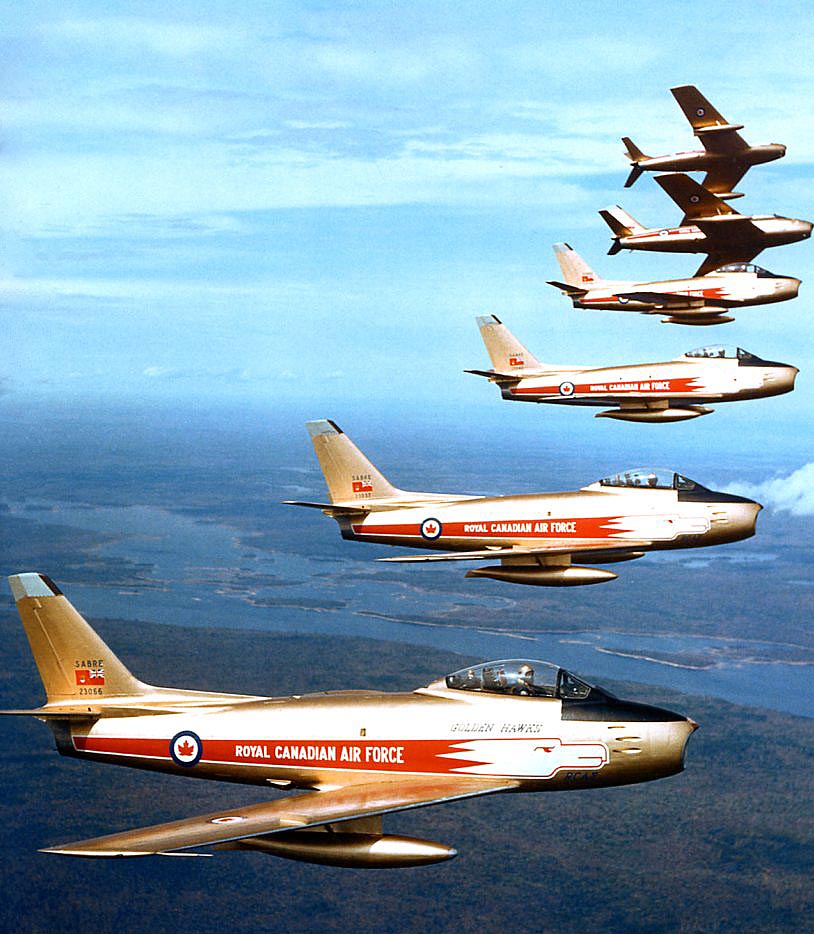
The Golden Hawks air demonstration team

James David McCombe (10 July 1932 – 7 January 2011) was a Royal Canadian Air Force (RCAF) pilot who was a commander of the Golden Hawks aerobatics team. His career with the RCAF spanned 23 years.

== Early years ==
James David McCombe was born on 10 July 1932 in Summerside, Prince Edward Island. After high school graduation from Sault Collegiate High School in Sault Ste. Marie, Ontario, he entered military service with the RCAF in 1951.

== Aviation career ==
Following conversion onto the Canadair F-86 fighter, McCombe was stationed at RCAF Station Chatham, New Brunswick. His first major posting was to No. 3 Fighter Wing in Zweibrücken, West Germany where he served on 434 (F) Squadron. After a transfer back to RCAF Chatham, he would instruct at the OTU on the F-86. In his RCAF career, McCombe would have over 900 hours of aerobatic flying on the Sabre.

=== Golden Hawks ===
In 1959, to celebrate the 35th anniversary of the RCAF and the 50th or "Golden" anniversary of Canadian flight, a team of Canadair F-86 Sabres, the "Golden Hawks" was created to fly at air shows. In February 1959, McCombe was selected by team leader S/L Fern Villeneuve to fly the right wing position on the newly formed team. (Note: The Golden Hawks were so popular after their 1959 show season that the team was re-established for 1960.)

McCombe spent three years on the team, his last as team leader in 1961. (Note: The Golden Hawks had a rule of three years for single men, max two years for married men, since the schedule was hard on their families.) McCombe eventually would fly in over 200 Golden Hawk air shows.

=== Later career ===
Following his posting on the Golden Hawks, McCombe transferred in 1961 to CFB Trenton in the Personnel Division but then went to Air Division Headquarters in Metz, France in the same department. In 1966, he spent 9 months at the Army Staff College in Kingston, Ontario, and from there went on to CFB Rivers, Manitoba to fly as an instructor for weapons training and air fighting on Canadair T-33 Silver Star jet trainers.

In 1970, McCombe reported to USAF HQ-TAC in Langley, Virginia as a Canadian exchange officer in the Doctrine Division. TAC was the designated agency for Tactical Doctrine for the Air Force and McCombe was part of the task force for revising and publishing it; Jim brought a great deal of experience to the job and the fresh perspective of another country. He also flew North American T-39 Sabreliners. In 1974, he chose a posting at CFB Summerside, flying the De Havilland Canada DHC-5 Buffalo for Search and Rescue and MedEvac duties, continuing until his early request for release from the military in response to policies within the RCAF on unification and other issues.

When McCombe retired from the Forces, he served 12 years with Transport Canada, ending his career there as a Regional Inspector for large aircraft. In 1986, he joined up with the new Air Atlantic as Chief Pilot, reluctantly retiring through disability in 1988.

In later years, McCombe maintained his interest in aviation through spending generous amounts of time with the Atlantic Canada Aviation Museum in Halifax. In 1995, he was instrumental in the recovery and restoration of Canadair Sabre 5 #23355 that was flown by the Golden Hawks. After being originally dedicated in 1986 as a gate guardian at the former CFB Chatham, the original home of the Golden Hawks, it has been on display at the Atlantic Canada Aviation Museum in Halifax, Nova Scotia since 2009.

== Personal life ==
McCombe married Ferne (née Stewart). The couple had four children together: Karyn, Sheila, Jim and Bill.

McCombe died on 7 January 2011 in Halifax, Nova Scotia.

== Bibliography ==
- Dempsey, Daniel V. A Tradition of Excellence: Canada's Airshow Team Heritage. Victoria, British Columbia: High Flight Enterprises, Second edition 2007, First edition 2002. ISBN 978-0-9687817-1-5.
- Fast, Beverley G. Snowbirds: Flying High, Canada's Snowbirds Celebrate 25 Years. Saskatoon, Saskatchewan: Lapel Marketing & Associates Inc., 1995. ISBN 0-96993-270-7.
- Mummery, Robert. Snowbirds: Canada's Ambassadors of the Sky. Edmonton, Alberta, Canada: Reidmore Books, 1984. ISBN 0-919091-37-7.
