= Dassault Falcon 10 =

Light business jet

Falcon 10 (Mystère 10)
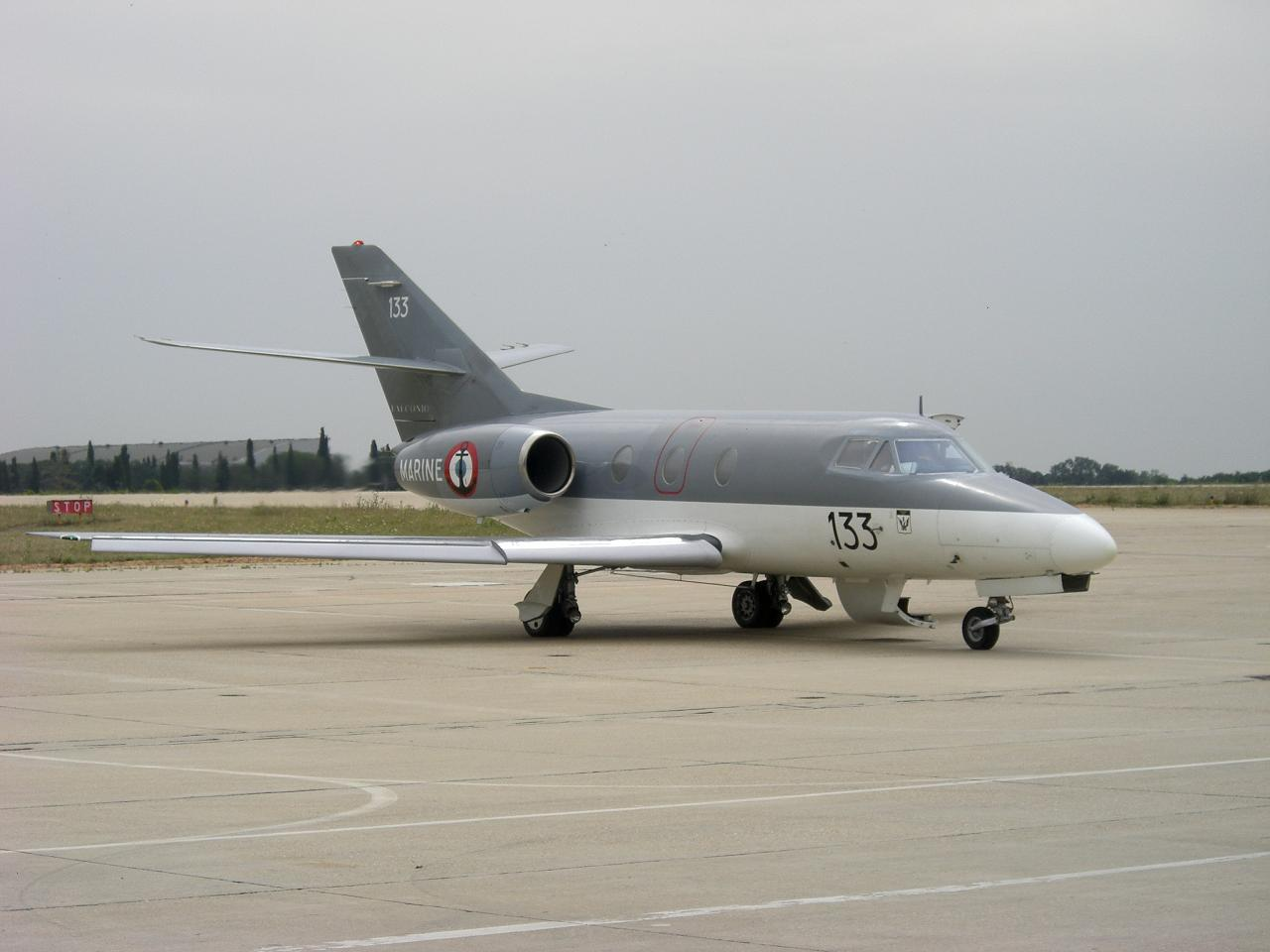
- Falcon 10MER of the French Navy, 2007

General information
- Type: Business jet
- National origin: France
- Manufacturer: Dassault Aviation
- Status: Active service
- Primary user: Corporate owners
- Number built: 226

History
- Manufactured: 1970–1989
- Introduction date: 1971
- First flight: 1 December 1970
- Developed from: Dassault Falcon 20

The Dassault Mystère/Falcon 10 is an early corporate jet aircraft developed by French aircraft manufacturer Dassault Aviation. Despite its numbering sequence it was actually developed after the Falcon 20, and although it is sometimes considered as a scaled-down version of that aircraft, it was totally redesigned with a non-circular fuselage, a new wing with slotted flaps, a split passenger door and many simplified circuits compared to the Falcon 20.

Production began in 1971 and ceased in 1989, but it remains a popular business jet on the second hand market.

By 2018, Falcon 10s from the 1970s were priced at $300,000 to $600,000.

== Variants ==
Minifalcon
This was the original name of the Dassault Falcon 10.
Falcon 10
Executive transport aircraft.
Falcon 10MER
Seven aircraft were used by the French Navy as instrument trainers, VIP transports, and communications and liaison aircraft up to 2026 when they were replaced by Pilatus PC-24 aircraft. MER stood for ‘Marine Entraînement Radar – Navy Radar Training’.
Falcon 100
Designed to replace the Falcon 10, the Series 100 had an increased takeoff weight, larger luggage compartment, and glass cockpit.

== Operators ==
=== Civil operators ===
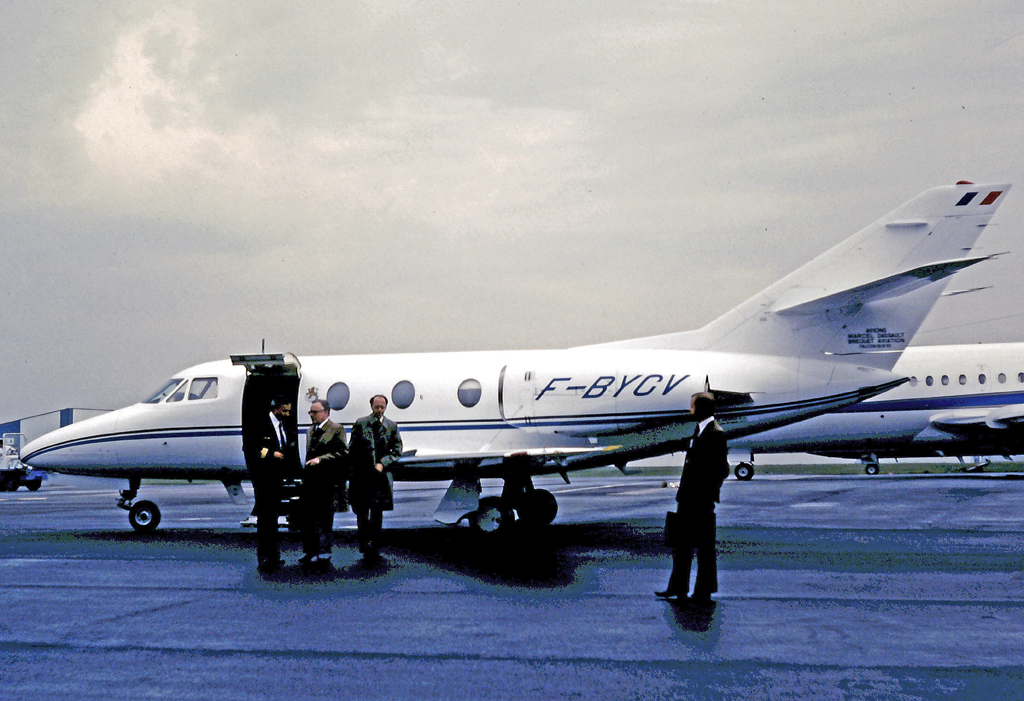
Corporate Falcon 10

Canada

- Air Nunavut

Croatia

- Government of Croatia – Former operator.

=== Military operators ===
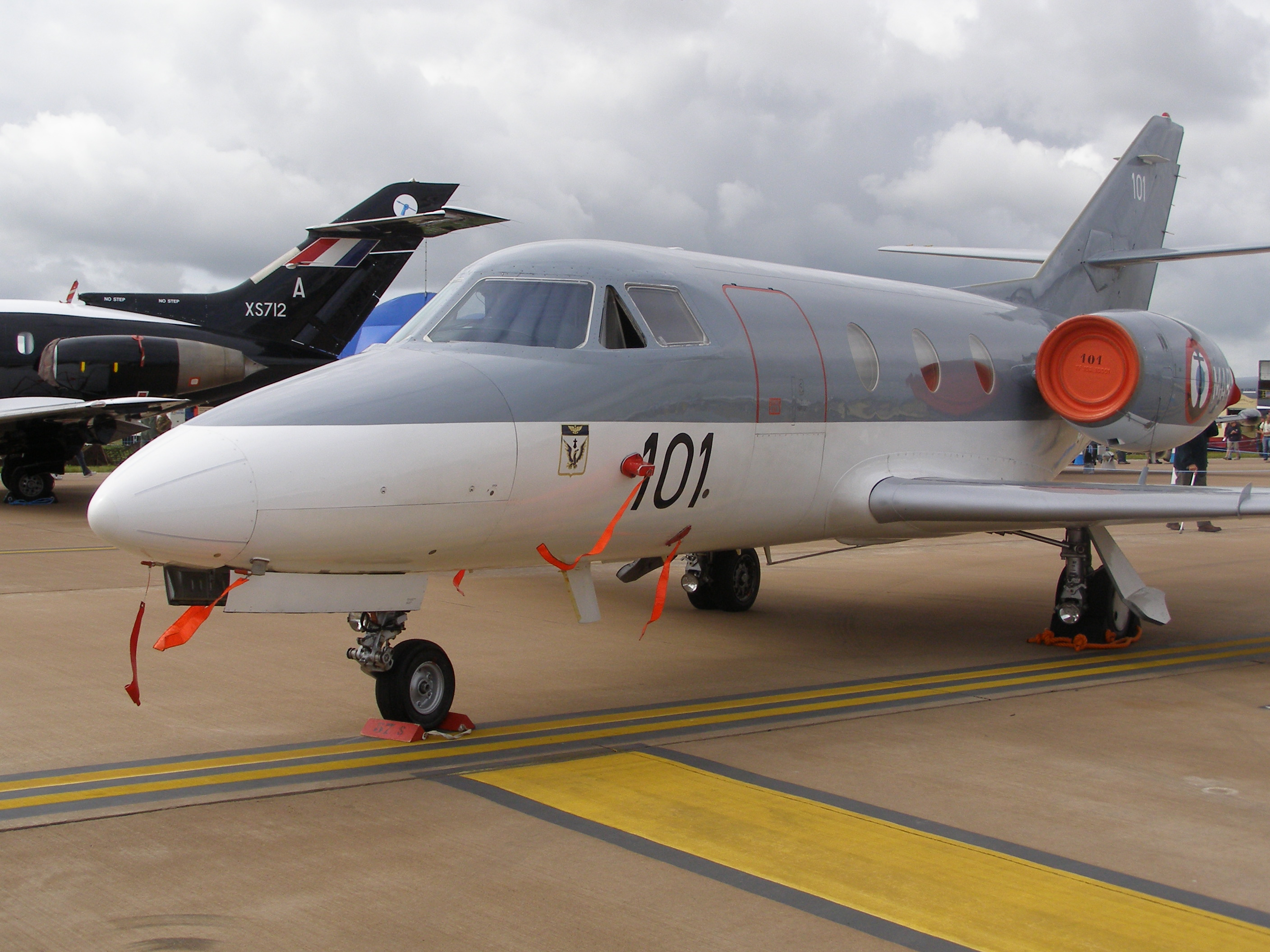
French Navy Falcon 10

France

- French Navy - received seven Falcon 10MER aircraft, of which six remained operational with Escadrille 57S as instrument trainers, VIP transports and liaison aircraft until 2026. Retired in November 2026.

Morocco

== Specifications ==
Data from Jane's All the World's Aircraft 1980–81

General characteristics

- Crew: 2
- Capacity: 4–7
- Length: 13.85 m (45 ft 5 in)
- Wingspan: 13.08 m (42 ft 11 in)
- Height: 4.61 m (15 ft 1 in)
- Wing area: 24.1 m^{2} (259 sq ft)
- Aspect ratio: 7.1:1
- Empty weight: 4,880 kg (10,759 lb)
- Max takeoff weight: 8,500 kg (18,739 lb)
- Fuel capacity: 3,340 L (730 imp gal; 880 US gal)
- Powerplant: 2 × Garrett TFE731-2 turbofans, 14.4 kN (3,230 lbf) thrust each

Performance

- Cruise speed: 915 km/h (569 mph, 494 kn) (max cruise)
- Never exceed speed: 650 km/h (400 mph, 350 kn) at sea level;
- Max Mach Number: 0.87
- Range: 3,555 km (2,209 mi, 1,920 nmi)
- Service ceiling: 13,800 m (45,300 ft) (Max. operating altitude)

== See also ==
Related development

- Dassault Falcon 20
- Dassault Falcon 50

Aircraft of comparable role, configuration, and era

- Aérospatiale Corvette
- Learjet 35

Related lists

- List of civil aircraft
