= VersaBank =

Canadian bank

- Type: Public
- Traded as: TSX: VBNK; Nasdaq: VBNK
- Industry: Banking
- Founded: 1980
- Headquarters: London, Ontario; 140 Fullarton Street Suite 2002 N6A 5P2
- Key people: David Taylor, President & CEO
- Products: Commercial banking; Mortgage loans; Structured credit
- Revenue: ▲ C$125 million (2025)
- Net income: ▼ C$28 million (2025)
- Total assets: ▲ C$5.81 billion (2025)
- Total equity: ▲ C$0.53 billion (2025)
- Number of employees: 200
- Website: www.versabank.com

VersaBank is a Canadian chartered bank headquartered in London, Ontario.

Formerly known as the Pacific & Western Bank of Canada, it was founded as a trust company in Saskatoon, Saskatchewan, in 1980 and later moved its head offices to London, Ontario. On August 1, 2002, it was granted a Schedule I Canadian chartered bank licence by the Canadian federal government, the first in approximately 18 years. The bank is publicly traded as VBNK on both the Toronto Stock Exchange and on the Nasdaq.

== History ==
In 1993, David Taylor and a group of investors acquired Pacific & Western Trust, a small trust company with six branches and a need for capital investment, and transformed it into the world's first branchless, electronic bank. In 2002, it became a Schedule 1 bank.

By 2013, the bank became Canada's tenth largest publicly traded bank when it began trading on the Toronto Stock Exchange.

The bank's deposits are raised digitally by way of a comprehensive broker network situated throughout Canada. In 2016, there were over 120 deposit broker firms raising its deposits, including many of the in-house brokerage firms of the big six Canadian banks. Its lending portfolio consists of commercial and corporate lending, real estate and development financing, and an innovative, electronic receivable purchase program.

In May 2016, the bank changed its name to VersaBank because Versa is the prefix for versatile and because Pacific & Western had little direct relevance given the Bank’s national and virtual focus. In 2017 the bank completed a revision of its ownership structure that included a merger with its largest stockholder, PWC Capital, reported to be "the first merger between a Schedule 1 bank and a holding company operating under the Canadian Business Corporations Act". In 2018, the company launched the construction of a digital vault to store cryptocurrencies and other valuable digital assets.

In 2022, VersaBank bought a single-branch bank in Holdingford, Minnesota, from Stearns Financial Services for $13.5 million, thus entering the US market for the first time. The Federal Reserve, the Office of the Comptroller of the Currency and Canada's Office of the Superintendent of Financial Institutions approved the deal in June 2024, two years after it was announced.

== See also ==
- Discovery Air
- List of Canadian banks
