= Air Nunavut =

Airline based in Iqaluit, Nunavut, Canada

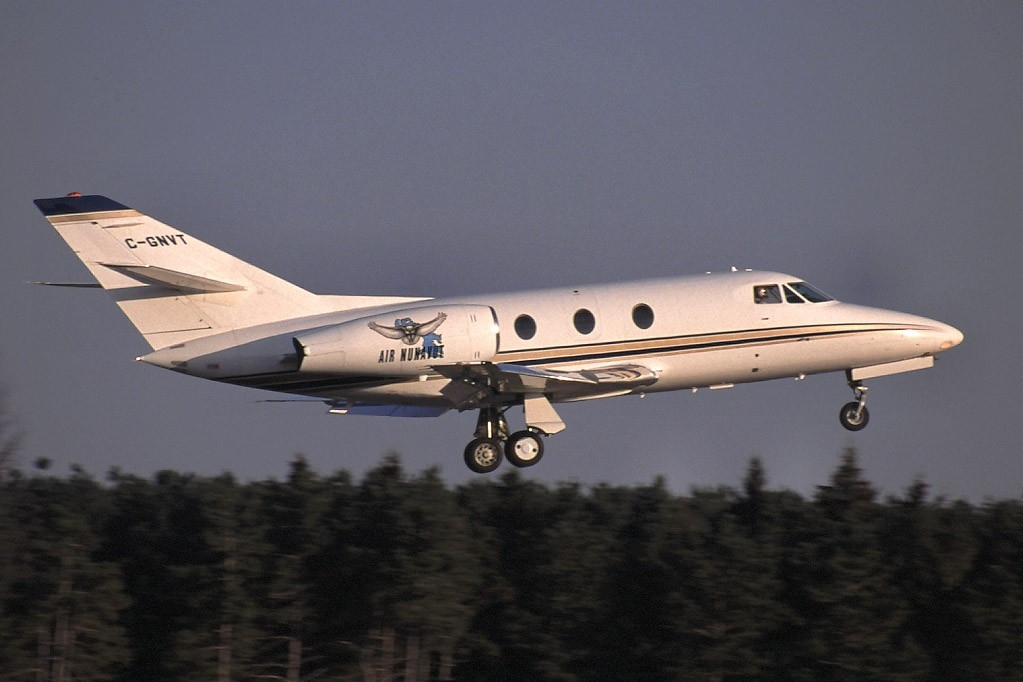
- Air Nunavut Dassault Falcon 10
IATA	ICAO	Call sign
N/A	BFF	AIR BAFFIN
- Founded: 1989
- AOC #: Canada: 5343; United States: Q1NF069F
- Hubs: Iqaluit Airport; Oshawa Executive Airport
- Fleet size: 15
- Destinations: Air charter/MEDEVAC
- Headquarters: Iqaluit, Nunavut and Oshawa, Ontario
- Key people: Jeff Mahoney (president)
- Website: Air Nunavut / SmoothAir Charter

Air Nunavut (Inuktitut: ᓄᓇᕗᑦ ᕐᑲᖓᑕᓲᖏᑦ; Nunavut Qangatasuungit), trading as Smooth Air, is an airline based in Iqaluit, Nunavut, Canada. It is the only local and Inuit-owned air carrier in the eastern Arctic, operating charter services throughout Canada's Arctic, northern Quebec, Greenland and Iceland. Its main base is Iqaluit Airport.

== History ==
The airline was established and started charter operations in 1989 as Air Baffin. Scheduled services were inaugurated in May 1992. It was renamed to Air Nunavut in 1996. In February 1998, Transport Canada temporarily suspended Air Nunavut's services due to flaws on its aircraft maintenance procedures following numerous incidents involving its fleet throughout the 90s, and specifically an incident involving its Piper PA 31-350 a month prior.

In April 2018, Air Nunavut was given a warning by the Canadian Transportation Agency due to contraventions of the Canada Transportation Act and Air Transportation Regulations based on investigations done in previous February. In 2019, an aircraft temporarily stopping at Clyde River Airport for refueling in a charter flight from Qaanaaq in Greenland to Iqaluit brought Air Nunavut to a penalty by the Canada Border Services Agency (CBSA) after letting its passengers out for a bathroom break in the airport, thus being considered as an immigration breach; the airport was alleged to be barely staffed at the time other than airport regulators, but was noticed by a CBSA staff. Air Nunavut argued that the "breach" was necessary for the passengers' dignity and safety, and fought back against the penalty as of 2022.

== Operations ==
The airline also has two main bases of operations, Oshawa Executive Airport and Iqaluit Airport. Under the division company name SmoothAir Charter operate Dassault Falcons out of Oshawa Executive Airport offering charter services. The Beechcraft King Air 200s remain in Iqaluit servicing the surrounding communities.

== Fleet ==
According to Transport Canada the Air Nunavut fleet consists of the following aircraft (as of February 2025):

Air Nunavut fleet
Aircraft	Number	Variants	Notes
Beechcraft Super King Air	4	200	8, 11 or 13 passengers, gravel strip capable.
Dassault Falcon 10	7	Falcon 10	Listed by Air Nunavut as Falcon 10 Jet, 7 passengers, gravel strip capable. One aircraft is listed by Transport Canada as having an expired temporary registration certificate. Only two listed at the SmoothAir Charter site.
Dassault Falcon 20	4	Mystère/Falcon 20F5; Falcon 200; Fan Jet Falcon	Only two listed at the SmoothAir Charter site.

The first Falcon 10 was purchased in 2001, making it the first small charter jet to operate out of Iqaluit within Nunavut. Air Nunavut obtained its first Falcon 900EX aircraft in December 2024, which was purchased from an American private ownership.
