= Keewatin Air =

Canadian airline

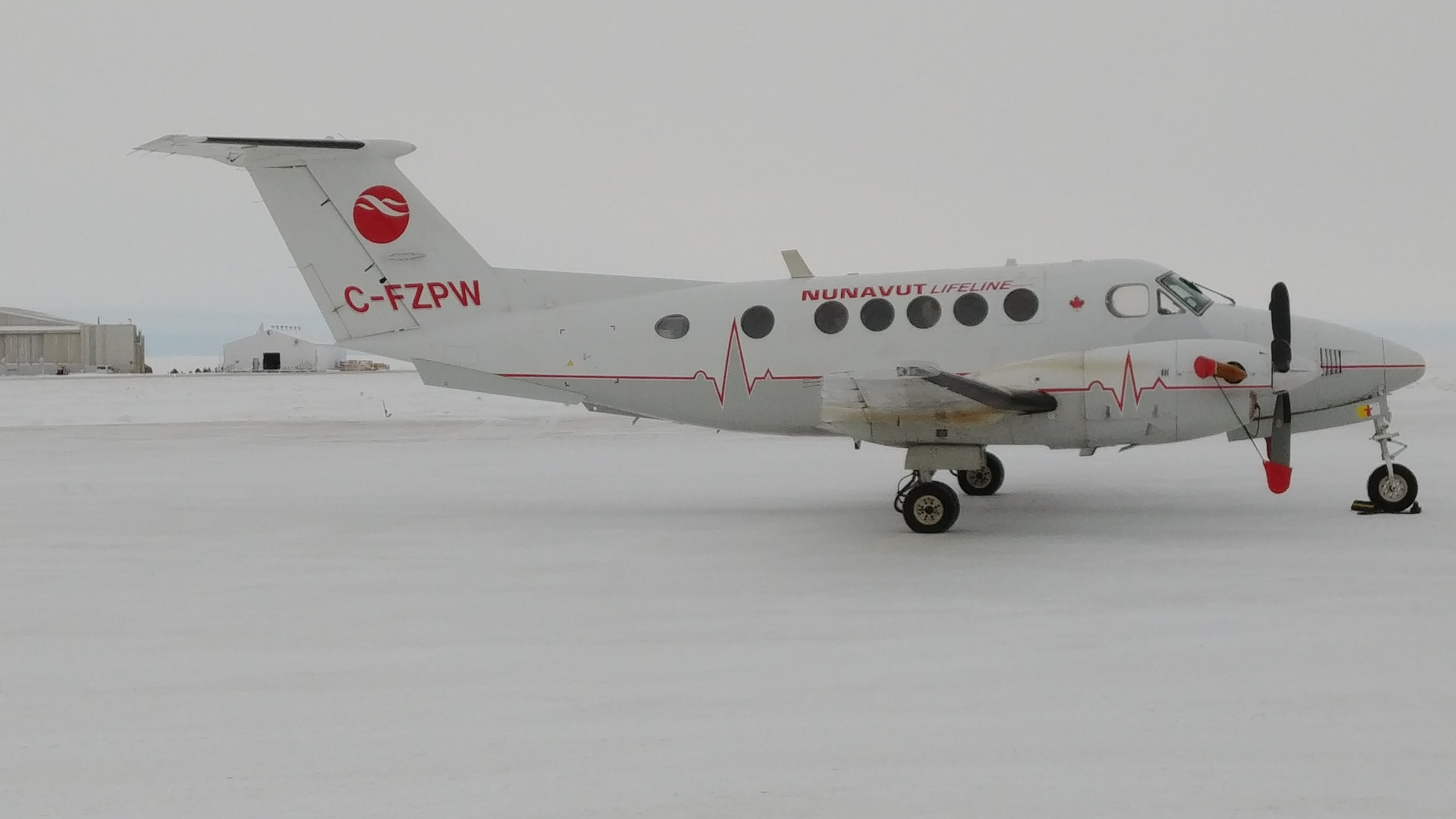
- Keewatin Air Beech 200
IATA	ICAO	Call sign
FK	KEW	BLIZZARD
- Founded: 1998
- AOC #: 782
- Operating bases: Winnipeg Richardson International Airport
- Secondary hubs: Churchill Airport, Thompson Airport, Cambridge Bay Airport, Igloolik Airport, Iqaluit Airport, Rankin Inlet Airport, Yellowknife Airport
- Fleet size: 26, 15 (min)
- Parent company: Exchange Income Corporation
- Headquarters: Winnipeg, Manitoba, Canada
- Website: https://www.keewatinair.ca/

Keewatin Air (IATA: FK) is an airline that operates from Winnipeg, Manitoba, Canada. The airline was started by Frank Robert May (who had been a pilot for Lamb Air) and his wife Judy Saxby in 1971, in the Keewatin Region, then part of the Northwest Territories.

It was formed as "Keewatin Air Limited" to provide charter services to the region. It was the first airline to have a permanent base in Nunavut (then known as the Keewatin Region of the Northwest Territories). In 1987 it expanded to include medical evacuation (MEDEVAC) services, to what would become the Kivalliq Region, using a fleet of aircraft that began with a Tradewind aircraft - a multi-modified Beech 18 with a turbine engine and tricycle gear. This aircraft was followed by a Westwind, another modified Beech 18 with turbine engines and eventually these were replaced by Merlin IIA aircraft that had the added benefit of being pressurized and had turboprops. The MEDEVAC service is now known as "Nunavut Lifeline". Currently three Kingair 200 aircraft are based in Rankin Inlet, one in Churchill, Manitoba. and two in Iqaluit, where the airline also bases a Lear 35 for the long hauls to Ottawa and a Pilatus PC-12 to access the short strips.

In 1998 the company formed Kivalliq Air to provide scheduled air service within the Kivalliq Region and to Winnipeg and Churchill. That service has since been cancelled.

In 2005 the company was sold to Exchange Industrial Income Fund (now Exchange Income Corporation), owners of Perimeter Aviation, Bearskin Airlines and Calm Air. May and Saxby continued to manage the airline for a short period after the sale.

== Destinations ==
Keewatin Air does not have specific destinations, but works primarily as a charter airline. They also provide aeromedical services.

Bases of operations
Aircraft	Service	City	Province/Area
Citation 560, PC-24, PC-12, King Air B200	Medevac, Administration hub, Maintenance	Winnipeg	Manitoba
King Air B200	Medevac and Passenger Terminal	Thompson	Manitoba
King Air B200	Medevac and Maintenance	Churchill	Manitoba
King Air B200, PC-12, Citation 560	Medevac and Maintenance	Iqaluit	Nunavut
King Air B200	Medevac	Igloolik	Nunavut
King Air B200	Medevac and Maintenance	Rankin Inlet	Nunavut
King Air B200	Medevac	Cambridge Bay	Nunavut
King Air B200	Medevac and Maintenance	Yellowknife	Northwest Territories

== Fleet ==
As of 4 October 2026 the following 27 aircraft were registered with Transport Canada and at least 10 listed with Keewatin Air.

Keewatin Air fleet
Aircraft	No. of aircraft Keewatin	No. of aircraft TC	Variants	Notes
Beechcraft Super King Air	15	16	3 - Model 200; 12 - Model B200; 11 - Model B200C	All 15 aircraft are listed at Keewatin Air as Beechcraft King Air 200/B200
Cessna Citation V	n/a	5	3 - Model 560 / 560 Citation V 1 - Model 560 Ultra; 1 - Model 560 Citation Encore	7-8 passengers. The Model 560 is the only one listed on the Keewatin Air site.
Pilatus PC-12	n/a	4	1 - PC-12/45; 3 - PC-12/47E	Air charter, single engine up to six passengers
Pilatus PC-24	n/a	2	First dedicated MEDEVAC jets, up to six passsengers.	
Total	15+	27		

== Accidents and incidents ==
- On December 22, 2012, a Fairchild Metro 3/23 twin-engine turboprop aircraft belonging to Perimeter Aviation but chartered by Kivalliq Air crashed near the end of the runway at Sanikiluaq Airport in northern Canada, killing a six-month-old baby and injuring the eight other people on board. The cause was not immediately known.
