= Gatineau-Ottawa Executive Airport =

Airport in Gatineau, Quebec, Canada

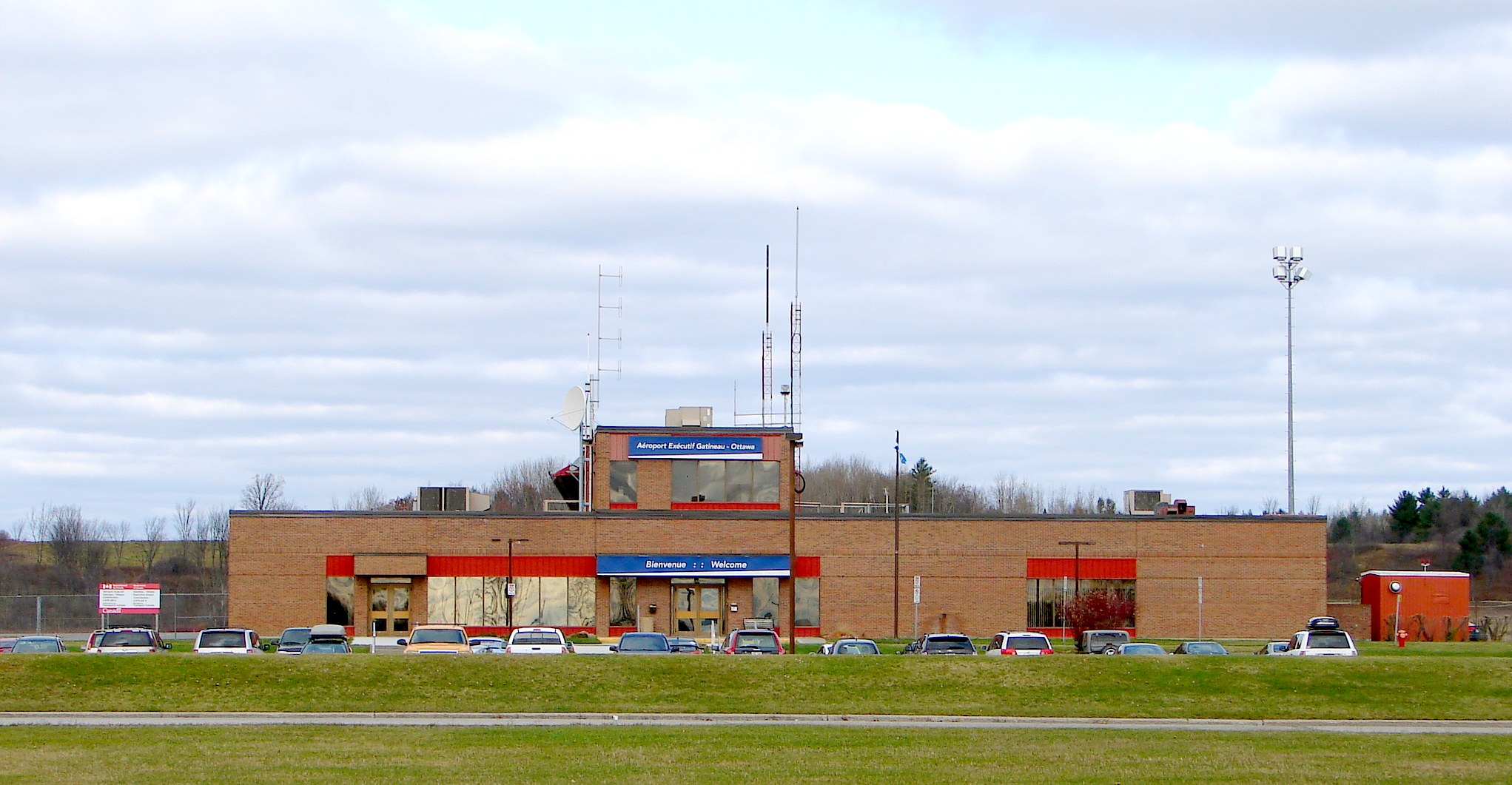
- IATA: YND; ICAO: CYND

Summary
- Airport type: Public
- Operator: La Corporation de l'Aéroport Exécutif Gatineau-Ottawa
- Location: Gatineau, Quebec, Canada
- Time zone: EST (UTC−05:00)
  - Summer (DST): EDT (UTC−04:00)
- Elevation AMSL: 211 ft / 64 m
- Coordinates: 45°31′18″N 075°33′49″W
- Website: www.aeroportdegatineau.com

Map
- Location in Quebec CYND (Canada)

Runways
Direction	Length		Surface
Direction	ft	m	Surface
09/27	6,000	1,829	Asphalt

Statistics (2012)
- Aircraft movements: 48,323
- Sources: Canada Flight Supplement; Movements from Statistics Canada

Gatineau-Ottawa Executive Airport (French: Aéroport Exécutif Gatineau-Ottawa or Ottawa/Gatineau Airport) (IATA: YND, ICAO: CYND) is an international airport serving Gatineau, Quebec, Canada, and its metropolitan area known as the National Capital Region.

The airport is classified as an airport of entry (for general aviation aircraft not exceeding 15 passengers) and is staffed by the Canada Border Services Agency. The airport also has car rental counters and restaurant services. It has a single, 6,000 ft × 150 ft (1,829 m × 46 m) asphalt runway oriented east–west. Most residents of Gatineau use the nearby Ottawa Macdonald–Cartier International Airport, or travel to Montréal-Pierre Elliott Trudeau International Airport.

The airport was inaugurated in 1978 and transferred to the City of Gatineau in 1991.

The airport houses the Vintage Wings of Canada, a nationwide non-for-profit organization that educates youth by use of vintage aircraft. The airport hosts an annual Aero Gatineau-Ottawa air show.

== Airlines and destinations ==
Airlines	Destinations
Propair	Montréal–Trudeau, Rouyn-Noranda

== Tenants ==
- Vintage Wings of Canada - historical aircraft collection and youth education organization
- Go SkyDive - skydiving
- Hélicraft 2000 Inc. - helicopter pilot training
- International Pilot Academy - private, commercial and airline pilot license training
- Select Aviation College - private, commercial and airline pilot license training as well as helicopter pilot training

== See also ==
- List of airports in the Ottawa area
- Executive airport
