= Golden Hawks =

Canadian military flight demonstration team 1959–1964

- Golden Hawks team patch
- Active: 1959–1964
- Country: Canada
- Branch: Royal Canadian Air Force
- Role: Aerobatic flight demonstration team
- Size: 7 aircraft
- Garrison/HQ: RCAF Station Chatham, RCAF Station Trenton
- Colors: Gold

Aircraft flown
- Fighter: Sabre

The Golden Hawks were a Royal Canadian Air Force (RCAF) aerobatic flying team established in 1959 to celebrate the 35th anniversary of the RCAF and the "Golden" 50th anniversary of Canadian flight, which began with the AEA Silver Dart in 1909.

== History ==
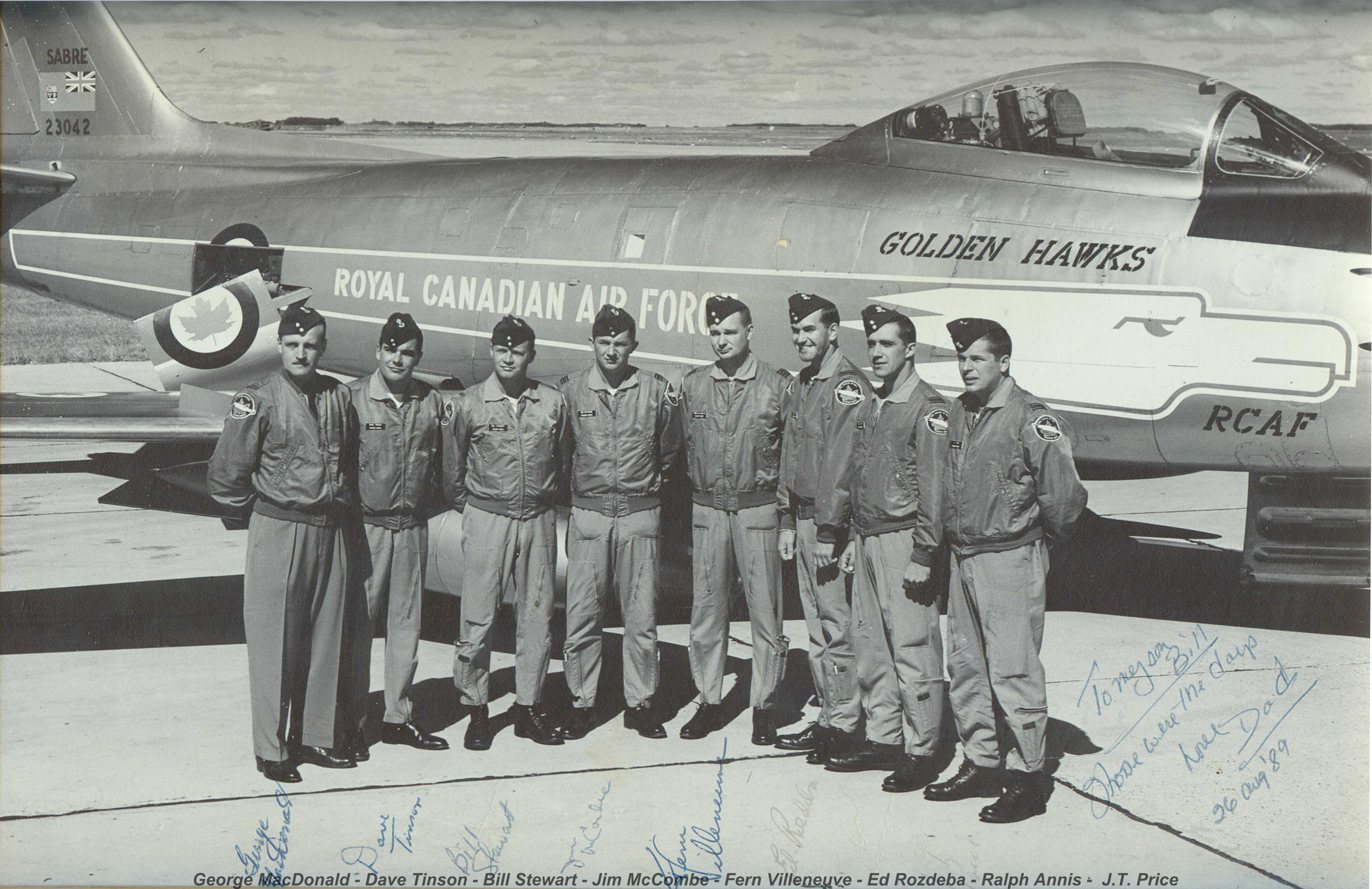
Signed team photograph

Initially, a six-plane team was envisioned as performing for only one year with the Canadair Sabre 5. The Golden Hawks originally had eight pilots led by Squadron Leader Fern Villeneuve, but the Golden Hawks were so popular after their 1959 show season that the team was re-established for 1960. The team, under the command of W/C Jack Allan, and the lead of S/L Villeneuve, included pilots: F/L James McCombe, F/L Edward Rozdeba, F/L Jeb Kerr, F/L Ralph Annis, F/L Sam Eisler, F/O Jim Holt and F/O William (Bill) Stewart.

In 1961, F/L McCombe became the leader of the team, as Villeneuve left the team when he married. (Note: Villeneuve and F/O Price both had to leave the team because the Golden Hawks had a rule of three years for single men, max two years for married men, since the schedule was hard on their families.) Two deaths altered the makeup of the team: F/O John T. Price joined the Hawks in 1959 after F/O Eisler died, and served as second solo. When F/L Kerr died in a crash in Calgary, F/O John T. Price moved to lead solo.

F/O Stewart's routine as lead solo was often the one most remembered since his low-level aerobatics looked to the crowd to be particularly dangerous. The Golden Hawks continued performing for three more seasons until they were disbanded, ostensibly for financial reasons, on February 7, 1964, having flown a total of 317 shows across North America.

Not only did the team perform standard loops and rolls in very tight formation, they also introduced their own trademark maneuvers. The Golden Hawks pioneered a two-aircraft head-on coordinated solo program which virtually every military team since has adopted in various ways. They also invented the Card 5 Maneuver, where five aircraft fly in a card formation, two up front, one in the middle, two in the back. They also created the Coordinated Two Aircraft 360, where two aircraft fly in opposite directions at low level at about 350 miles per hour (560 km/h), at about seven gravities, in a horizontal circle and pass each other on both sides of the circle.

The legacy of the Golden Hawks lives on with the Canadian Forces Snowbirds.

== Accidents and incidents ==
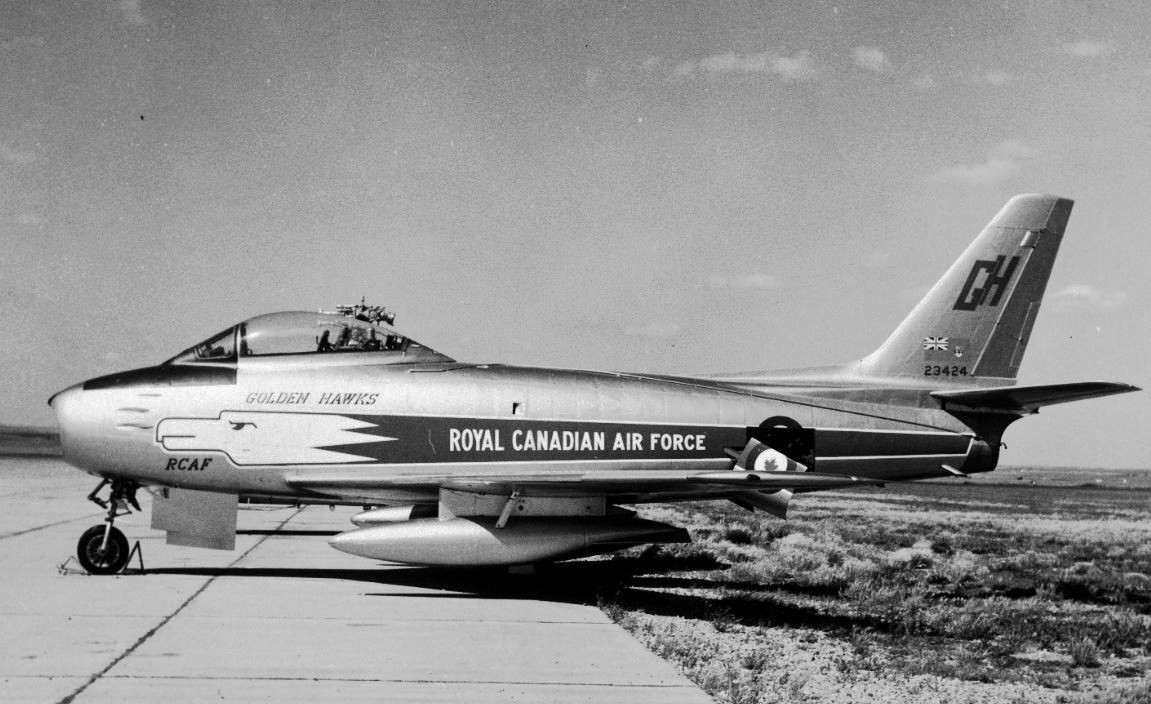
23424 one of 2 ex-Golden Hawk Sabres purchased by Lynn Garrison for his collection in July, 1964

- 12 March 1959: A Golden Hawks Sabre crashed into a wooded area near RCAF Station Chatham while practising a co-solo routine, killing F/L Sam Eisler.
- 21 June 1959: A solo Golden Hawk Sabre piloted by F/L J.T. Price was struck by a bird over Bedford Basin, Halifax, Nova Scotia, shattering the windscreen and canopy. Although the pilot's helmet visor was torn away and his vision was temporarily impaired, F/L Price was able to land safely with the assistance of F/L R.H. Annis, the other solo pilot.
- 10 August 1959: A Golden Hawks Sabre landing at McCall Airfield, Calgary, Alberta, with the rest of the team collided with a Piper Tri-Pacer while turning base leg about 2 miles (3.2 km) west of the field. The Sabre pilot, F/L Jeb Kerr, and two occupants of the Pacer were killed. The Pacer had not been authorized to enter the control zone.
- 22 February 1961: Golden Hawks Sabre pilot F/O Jim McCann was killed during formation practice after the right wing of his aircraft was severely damaged during a collision with another Sabre.
- April 1961: Golden Hawks pilot F/O Bill Stewart ejected at low altitude during a practice routine near Chatham because of an engine malfunction.

== Aircraft on display ==
Original Golden Hawks aircraft are found in several locations including Canadair Sabre 6 #23651 on display at the Canadian Warplane Heritage Museum in Mount Hope, Ontario. The original Golden Hawks Sabre 6 is on loan from the Canada Aviation and Space Museum, and is displayed with Plexiglas panels on the port side. (Note: Sabre 6 #23651 was built in 1956, flew overseas with NATO and in Canada with the Golden Hawks aerobatic team. It was transferred to the Canada Aviation and Space Museum in 1964.) The National Air Force Museum of Canada has a Golden Hawks Canadair Sabre 6 (#23641) that was formerly mounted on a pylon at CFB Mountainview and is now on display at CFB Trenton, Ontario. Canadian Sabre 5 #23355 that was flown by the Golden Hawks is on display at the Atlantic Canada Aviation Museum in Halifax, Nova Scotia, after being originally dedicated in 1986 as a gate guardian at the former CFB Chatham, and ultimately restored at the museum. (Note: James McCombe, former lead on the Golden Hawks, was a volunteer at the museum and assisted in the aircraft restoration.) A Canadair Sabre 6 painted as (#23042) that flew with the Golden Hawks is also on display at the Technik Museum Speyer in Speyer (Rhineland-Palatinate), Germany.

In 2009, Canadair T-33 "133500" Golden Hawk Support Aircraft was acquired by the Jet Aircraft Museum.

Golden Hawks aircraft serial number 23053 resides at Zwick’s Park in Belleville, Ontario.

A Golden Hawk, recently re-furbished aircraft, can be found at the waterfront in Brockville, ON.

Serial number 23164 resides at Germain Park in Sarnia, Ontario, and was refurbished in 2014.

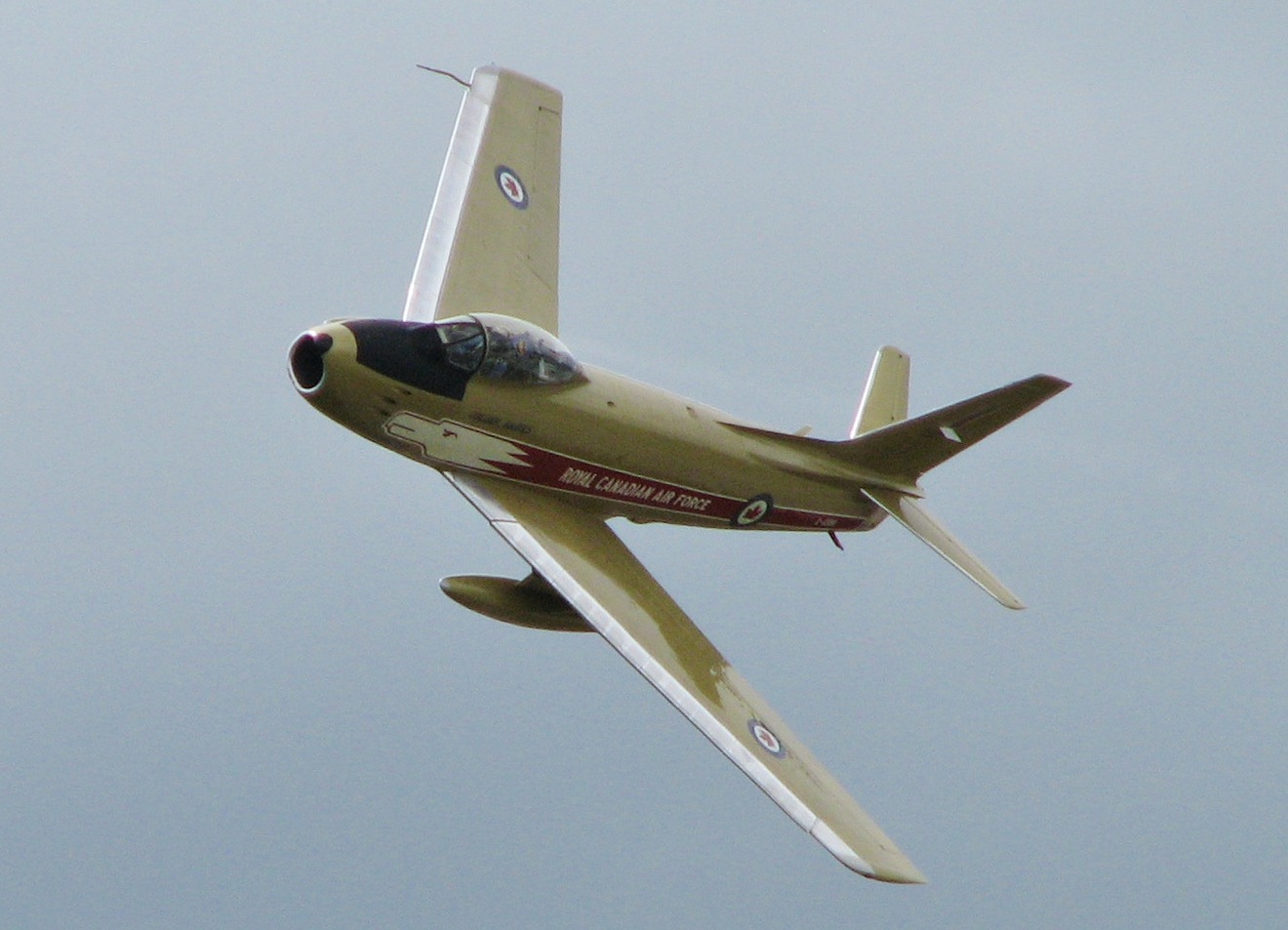
Hawk One performing at the Portage-la-Prairie airshow, 2009

== Tributes and honours ==
In Oakville, Ontario, 540 Golden Hawks Royal Canadian Air Cadet Squadron is named for the air demonstration team. After their formation in 1951, the squadron chose to petition the Canadian federal government in 1964 to assume the RCAF unit's name and identity as its own. The Department of National Defence granted permission in 1968 and since that time, 540 RCAC Squadron "has been proud to officially carry the Golden Hawks name."

At the former home base for the team, the Junior A hockey team in Trenton, Ontario, takes its name from the Golden Hawks. The symbol of the team features a Sabre jet outlined in gold. Similarly, the Chatham-Kent Secondary School sport teams in southern Ontario all take the name Golden Hawks.

In 2009, Hawk One, a fully refurbished Canadair Sabre 5 (#23314) in Golden Hawk colours owned by Vintage Wings of Canada, helped to celebrate the Centennial of Flight in Canada.
