= Adlair Aviation =

Charter airline of Canada

Adlair Aviation (1983) Ltd.

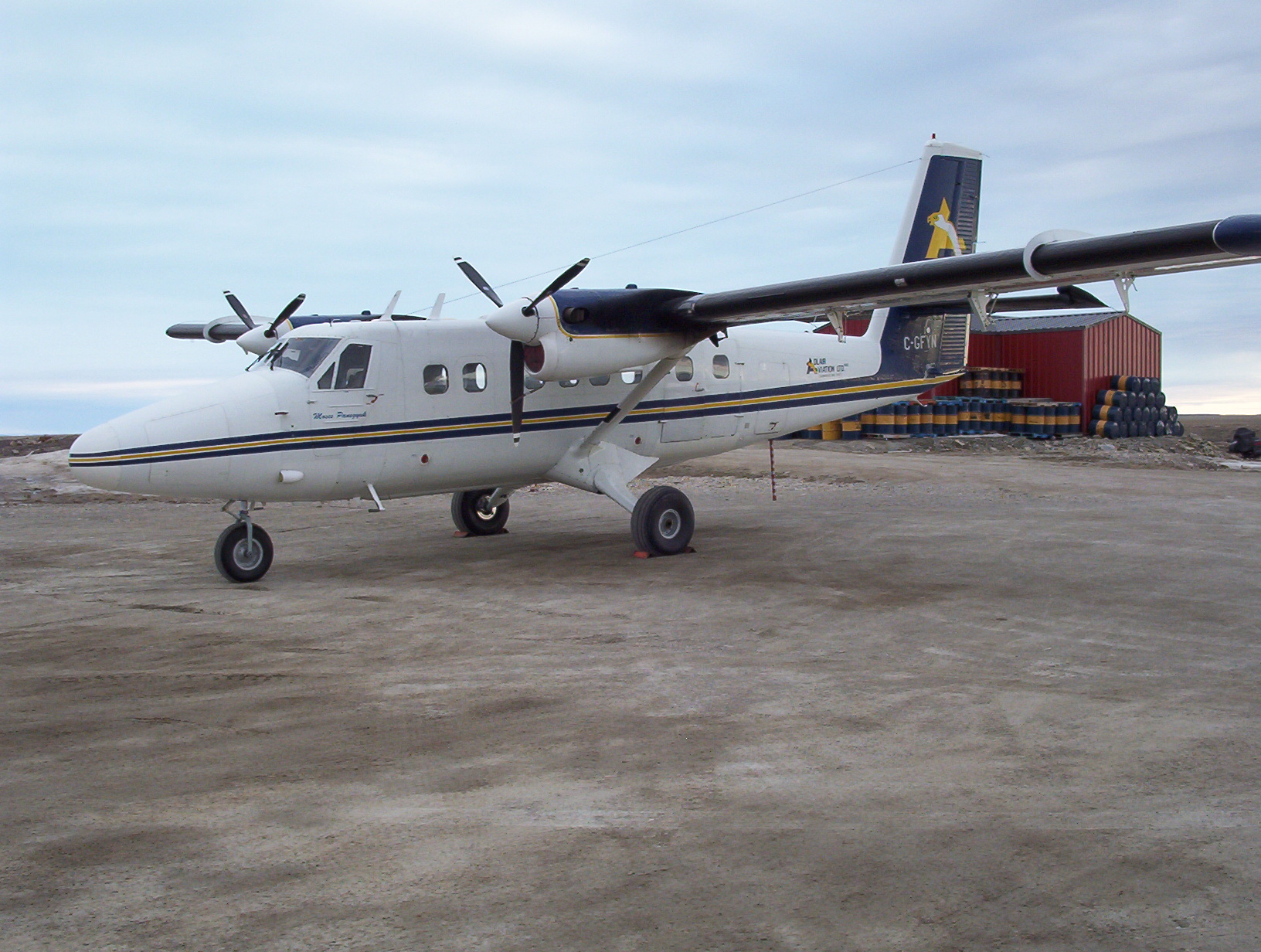
- Adlair Aviation Twin Otter
- Founded: 1983
- Commenced operations: 1984
- AOC #: 3350
- Hubs: Cambridge Bay Airport
- Secondary hubs: Yellowknife Airport
- Fleet size: 2
- Headquarters: Cambridge Bay
- Website: https://adlair.ca/

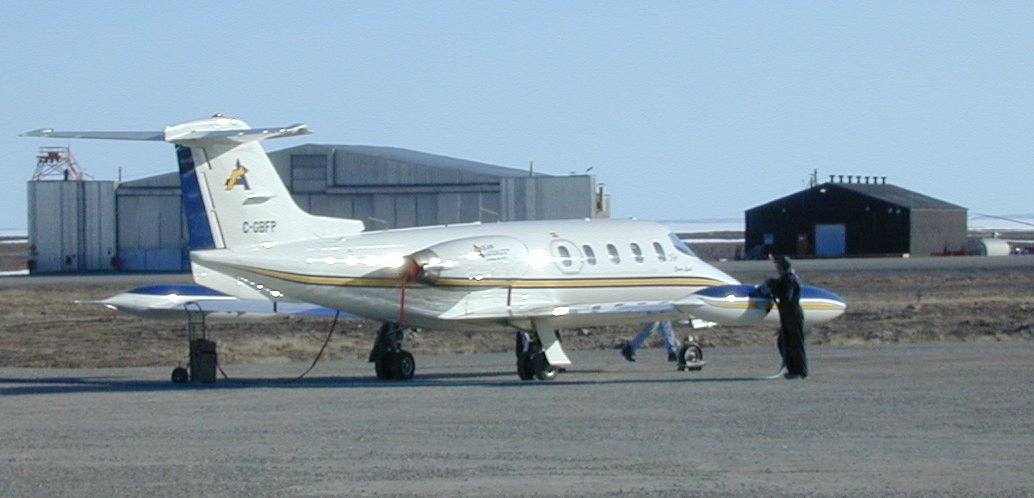
Adlair's Learjet 25B

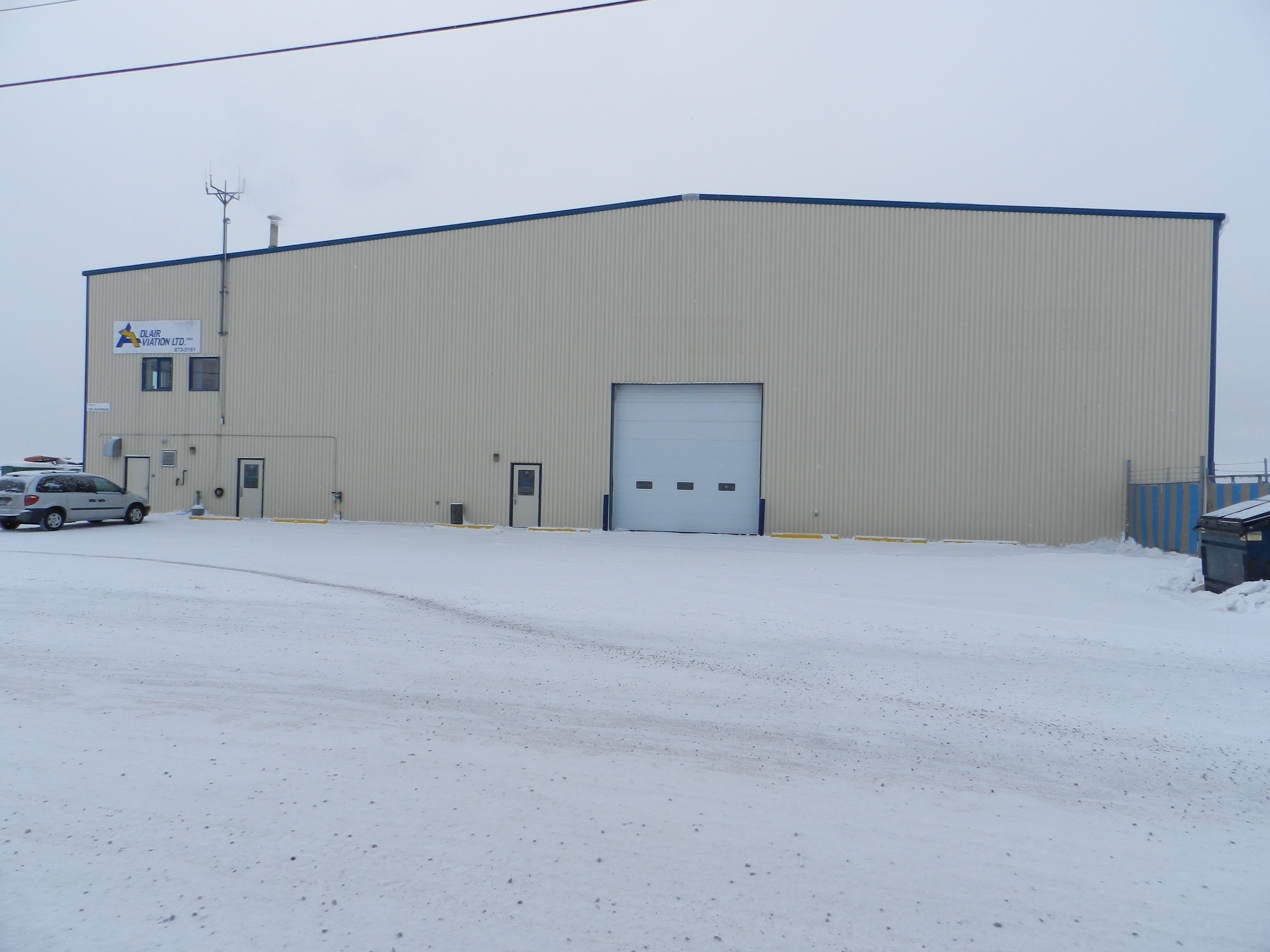
Yellowknife base of Adlair Aviation

Adlair Aviation (1983) Ltd. is a family-owned charter airline in Cambridge Bay, Nunavut, Canada. Adlair Aviation was established in 1983 by pilot Willy Laserich and his family. Adlair has bases at Cambridge Bay Airport and Yellowknife Airport.

== History ==
=== Founding ===
Adlair Aviation was founded in 1973 by Wilhelm Adolph "Willy" Laserich, a German immigrant and pilot, initially incorporating as Adlair Aviation Ltd. Adlair flew passengers and cargo from their base in Cambridge Bay. One regular charter that Adlair undertook was the transportation of Arctic char. The fish was caught at various sites in the North, and Adlair would fly the fish to a processing plant in Cambridge Bay. Adlair flew sixty thousand pounds of Arctic char per year at its peak. During this time, Adlair provided medevac service, and performed other charter services.

Laserich and Adlair performed these services without an approved operating license. Laserich applied for an operating license multiple times in the 1970s, but was refused each time. Despite these refusals, Laserich and Adlair continued to perform commercial aviation services. As a result, in 1977, Laserich was charged with over two hundred offenses by the Air Transport Committee of the Canadian Transport Commission. Laserich was tried for these charges in 1981 and was convicted for one offense of running an illegal charter service in 1982.

Despite avoiding a majority of the charges, the legal fees strained Laserich and Adlair's finances. A loan call resulted in Adlair giving up five of its aircraft. However, shortly before his trial, Laserich finally able to obtain a charter license. With this license, Laserich and his family re-incorporated the airline as Adlair Aviation (1983) Ltd.

=== Kitikmeot Region medevac contract ===
Adlair Aviation was contracted by the Government of Nunavut to provide medevac or air ambulance services to the Kitikmeot Region between the territory's creation in 1999 and 2011. It was previously contracted provide the same services for the Northwest Territories before Nunavut was created. The medevac services accounted for 70% of Adlair Aviation's business as of 2011. In total, Adlair Aviation completed approximately two thousand medevac flights between 1983 and 2001.

Beginning in 1992, Adlair Aviation's medevac flights were staffed by nurses based in Cambridge Bay and Yellowknife who were employed by Medflight. Medflight itself was founded when Adlair Aviation asked Patricia O'Connor, a registered nurse, to set up a nursing base in Cambridge Bay. In 2007, O'Connor was named a member of the Order of Canada for founding Medflight, and for advancing medevac practices in Arctic Canada.

In August 2011, the Government of Nunavut announced that the medevac contract for the Kitikmeot Region had been given to Air Tindi, along with its partner Aqsaqniq. Adlair Aviation appealed the decision to the Nunavummi Nangminiqaqtunik Ikajuuti, but the appeal was dismissed on October 29, 2011. Adlair Aviation was given an extension on their contract until the end of November 2011.

In December 2012, Adlair Aviation filed a $31.5 million lawsuit against the Government of Nunavut over the loss of the medevac contract. In October 2017, the lawsuit was dismissed.

== Fleet ==
The Adlair fleet consists of the following aircraft (as of September 2022) registered with Transport Canada:

Adlair Aviation fleet
Aircraft	No. of aircraft	Variants	Notes
Beechcraft Super King Air	1	200	Charters
Learjet 25	1	25B	

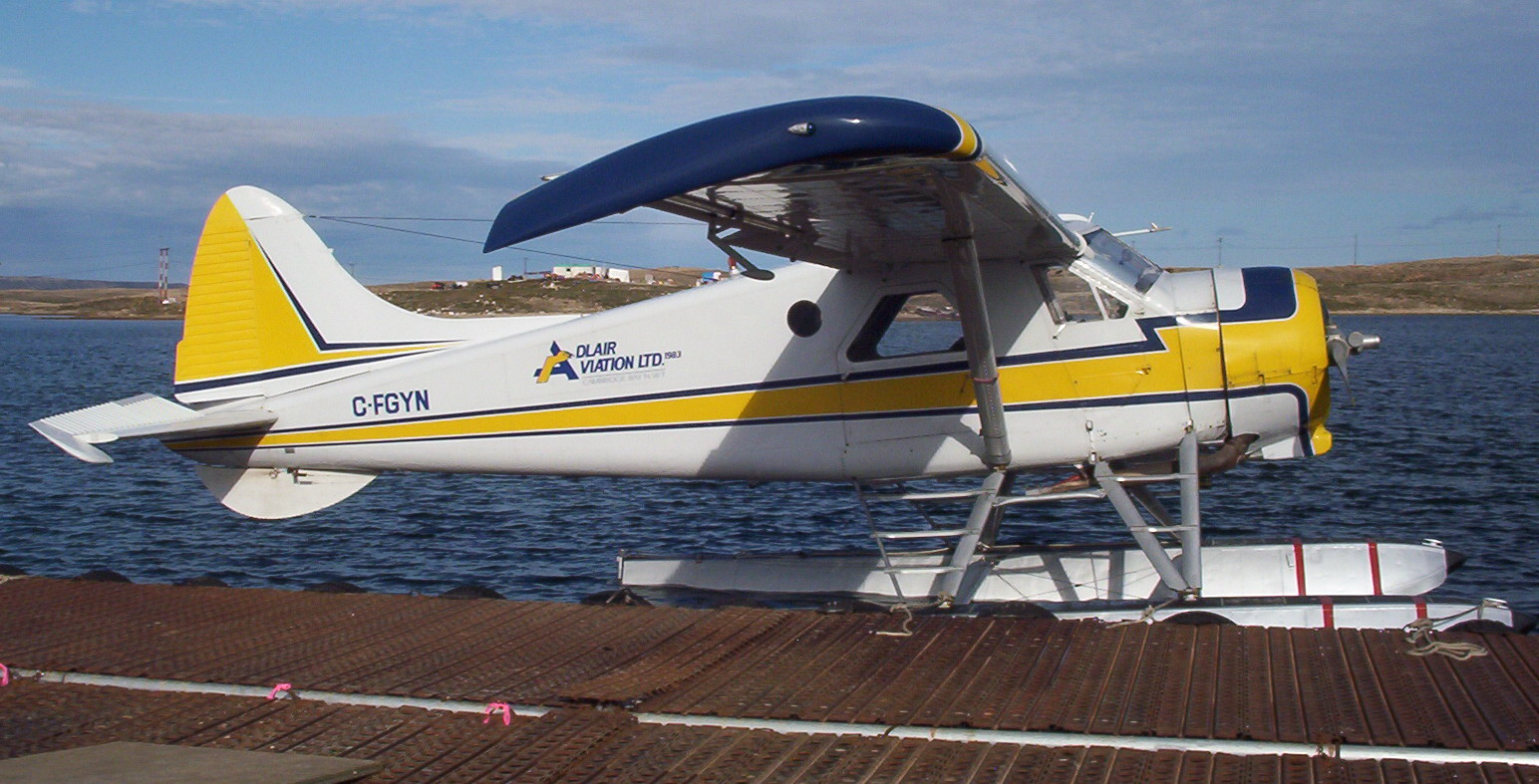
Adlair Aviation's DHC Beaver (former)

== Incidents ==
On April 15, 2009, an Adlair Aviation flight was returning from Yellowknife to Cambridge Bay. The plane in the incident was a Beechcraft King Air 200 with tail number C-GCYN. While about 180 km (110 mi) from the airport, and at 23,000 ft (7,000 m), one of the two passengers, Julian Tologanak-Labrie, (Note: Some sources give the victim's first name as Julien, and the victim's last name as Tologanak.) became upset, opened the cabin door and jumped to his death. The aircraft landed in Cambridge Bay with the damaged door partially open and no injuries to the flight crew or the other passenger.

An inquest was called by Nunavut's chief coroner in June 2009. The inquest concluded in April 2010, and ruled that Tologanak committed suicide. The inquest recommended that Adlair Aviation install rear-view mirrors in its medevac aircraft, and have a nurse onboard during medical charter flights, although Adlair Aviation already instituted a policy requiring such a nurse as a result of the incident. The Transportation Safety Board of Canada declined to investigate the incident.
