= Cambridge Bay Airport =

Airport in Nunavut, Canada

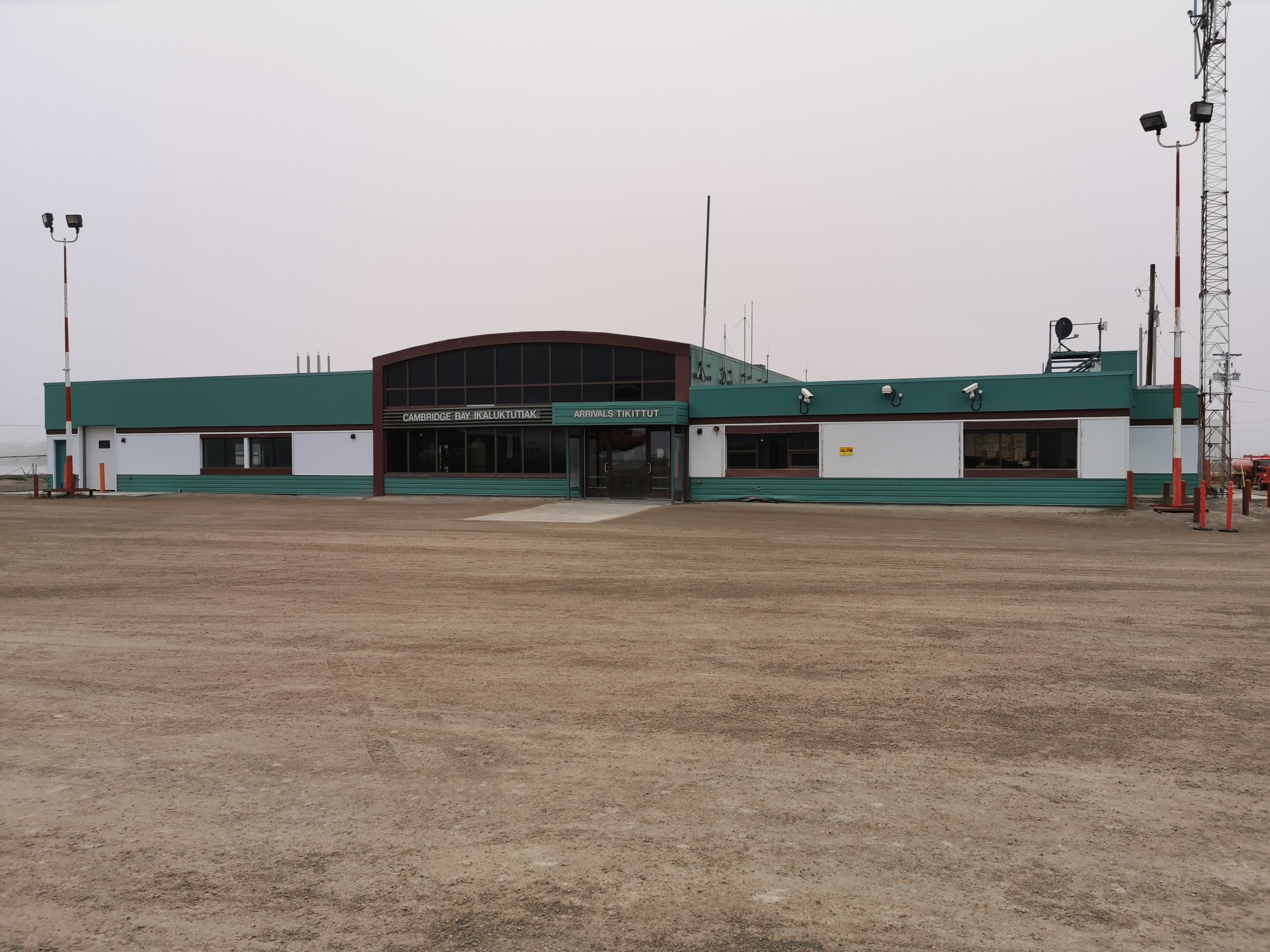
- IATA: YCB; ICAO: CYCB; WMO: 71925

Summary
- Airport type: Public
- Owner/Operator: Government of Nunavut
- Location: Cambridge Bay, Nunavut, Canada
- Time zone: MST (UTC−07:00)
  - Summer (DST): MDT (UTC−06:00)
- Elevation AMSL: 102 ft / 31 m
- Coordinates: 69°06′29″N 105°08′14″W

Maps
- Interactive map of Cambridge Bay Airport

Runways
Direction	Length		Surface
Direction	ft	m	Surface
13/31	5,076	1,547	Gravel

Statistics (2010)
- Aircraft movements: 6,215
- Source: Canada Flight Supplement and Transport Canada; Movements from Statistics Canada. Environment and Climate Change Canada

Cambridge Bay Airport (IATA: YCB, ICAO: CYCB) is located 1.6 nautical miles (3.0 km; 1.8 mi) southwest of Cambridge Bay, Nunavut, Canada, and is operated by the government of Nunavut.

== History ==
In December 2005 the Government of Nunavut announced that they would spend $18 million to pave the runway.

On 14 May 2008 a press release from the then Premier of Nunavut, Paul Okalik, and Member of the Legislative Assembly, Keith Peterson, indicated that over the next three years the runway would be widened and lengthened.

On 6 May 2023, Canadian North operated its last flight into Cambridge Bay Airport with a Boeing 737-200 jet, a combi aircraft equipped for gravel runway operations, as this specific jetliner type was then retired from its fleet with the airline continuing to serve the airport, as of 2023, with ATR 42 turboprop aircraft.

== Airlines and destinations ==
=== Scheduled ===
Airlines	Destinations
Canadian North	Gjoa Haven, Kugaaruk, Kugluktuk, Taloyoak, Yellowknife

=== Charter ===
Airlines	Destinations
Adlair Aviation / Kitikmeot Air	Charters
Kivalliq Air	MEDIVAC
Canadian Helicopters	North Warning System contract

=== Cargo ===
Airlines	Destinations
Buffalo Airways	Yellowknife

=== Historical airline jet service ===
Besides Canadian North, several other airlines operated Boeing 737 jet service, all the 200 series, into the Cambridge Bay Airport in the past. Airlines include Pacific Western Airlines, Northwest Territorial Airways (also known as NWT Air), codesharing with Air Canada, and First Air, purchaser of NWT Air and also codesharing Air Canada.

== Gallery ==
Aircraft at Cambridge Bay
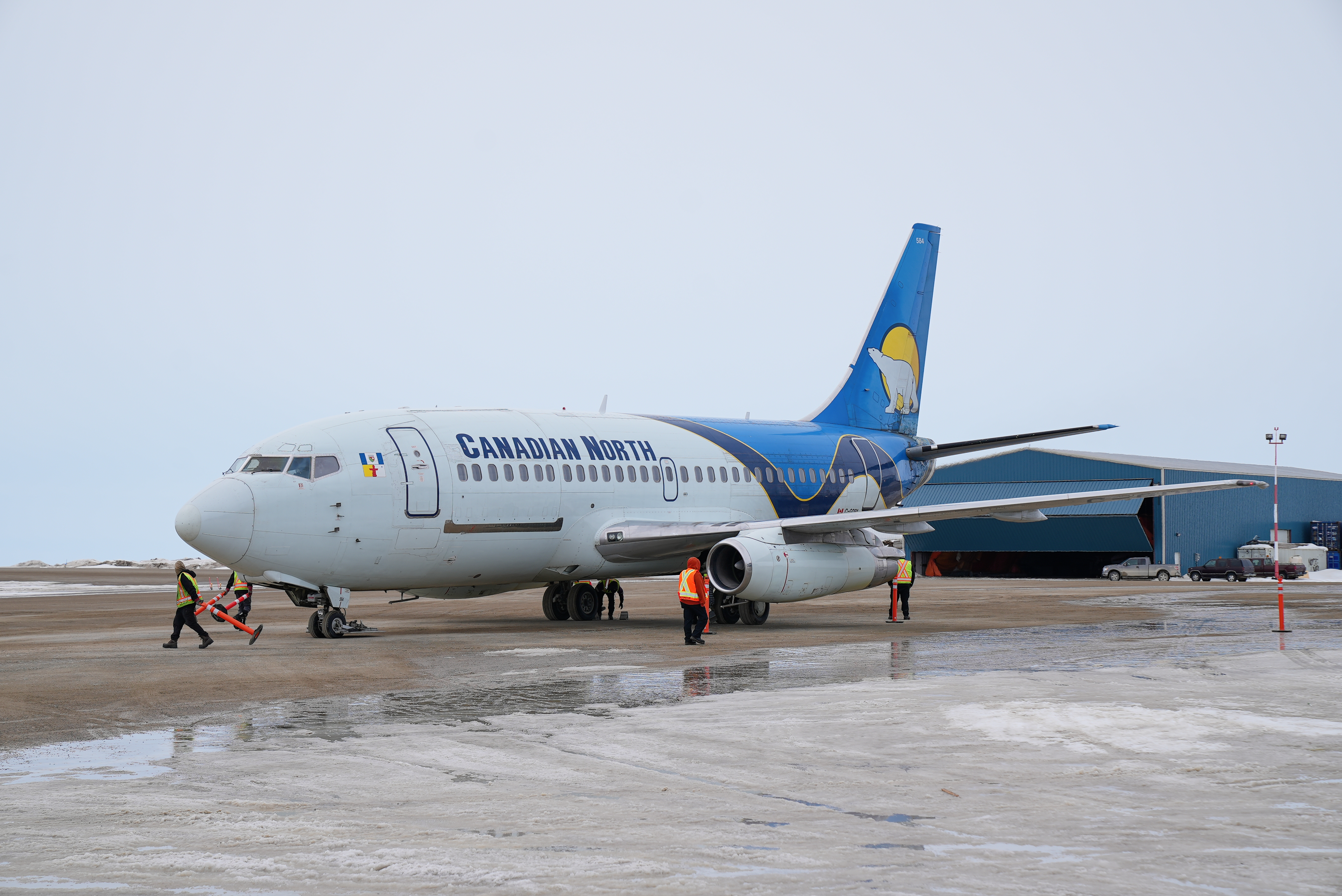
Canadian North (GDPA) operating its final Boeing 737-200 in 2023

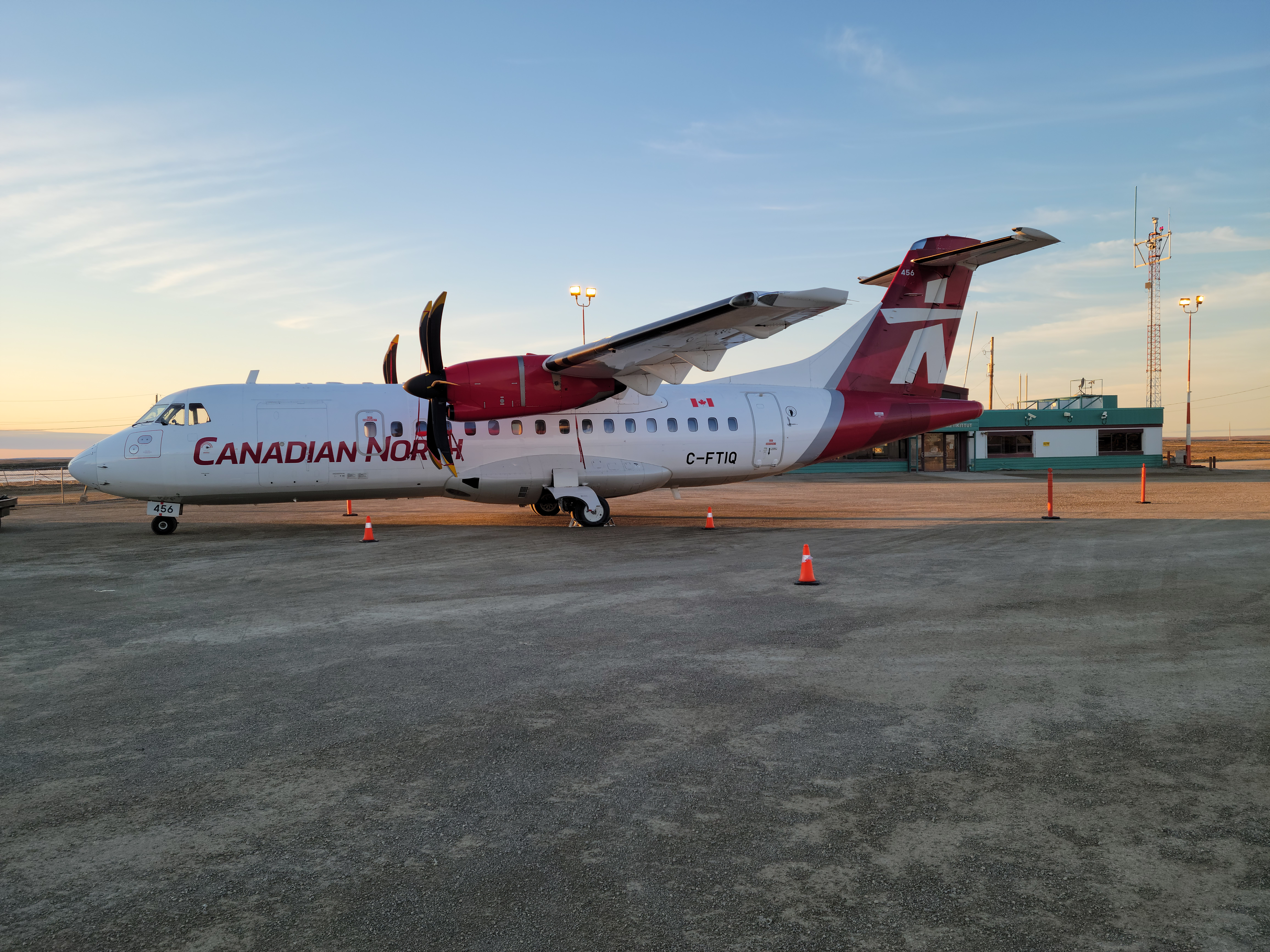
Canadian North ATR 42

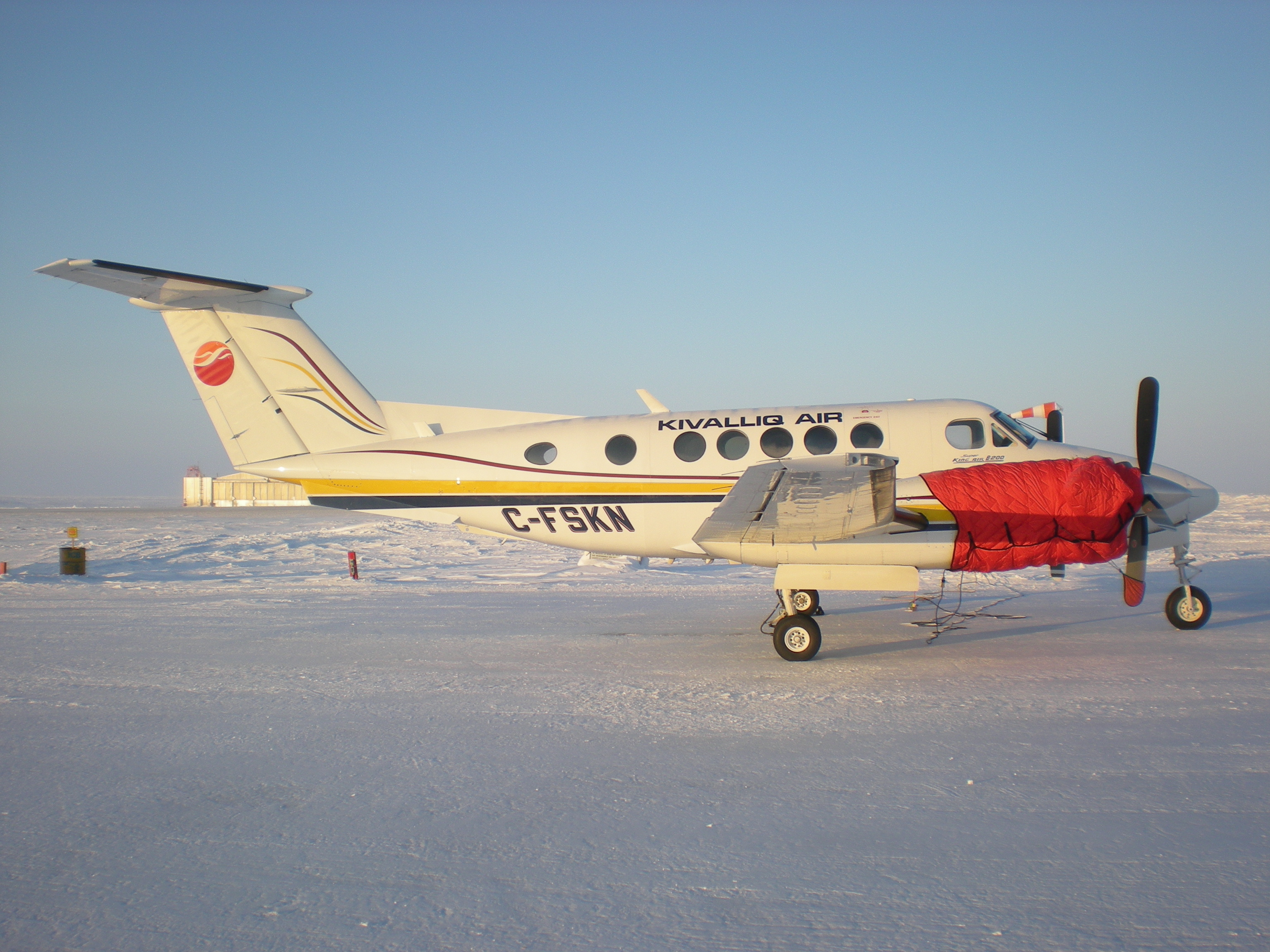
A Beech 200 of Kivalliq Air, operating as Blizzard 203 (medevac)

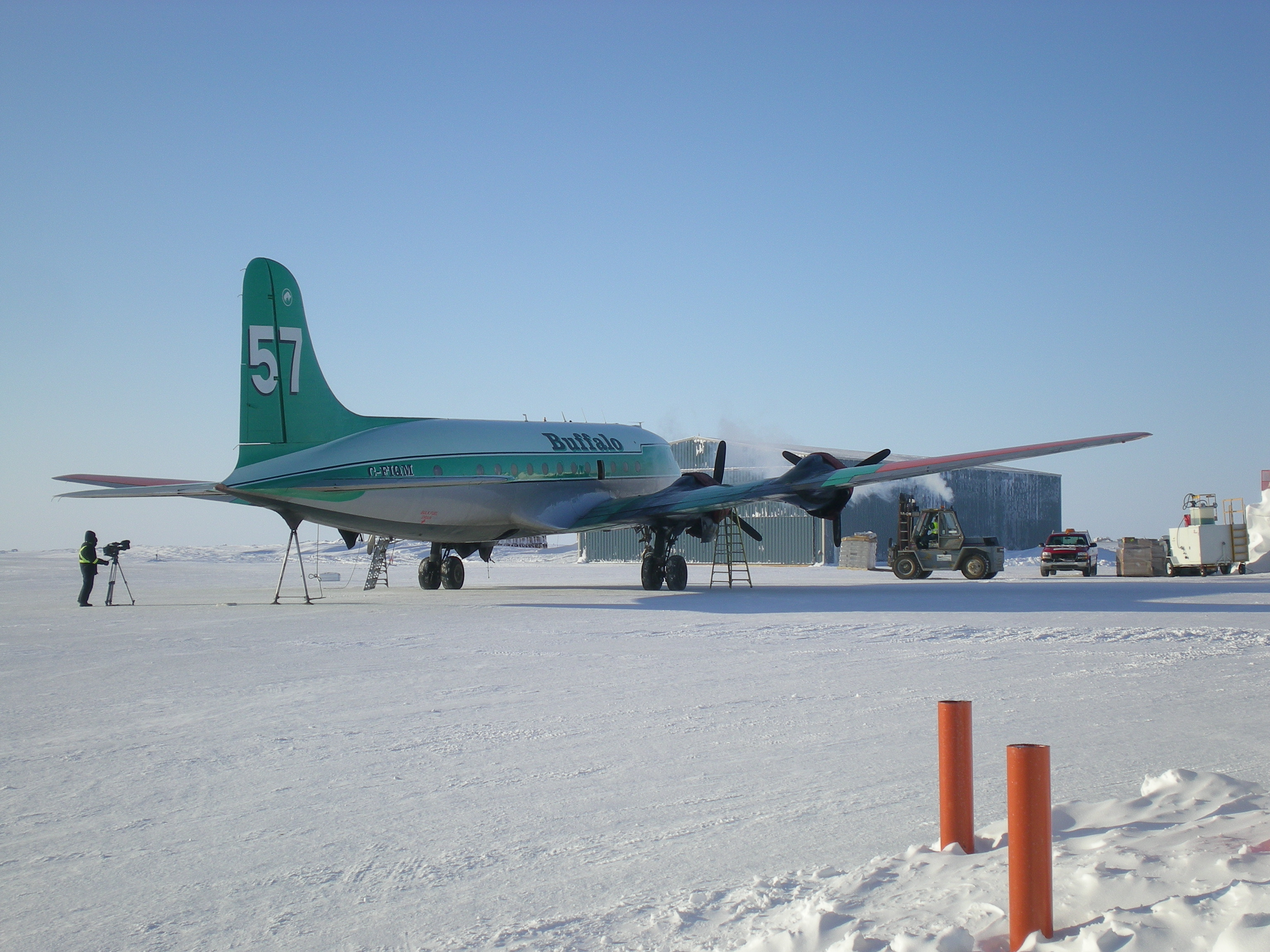
A Douglas C-54 Skymaster of Buffalo Airways while filming for Ice Pilots NWT

== Accidents ==
- On 13 December 2008, a Dornier 228 C-FYEV with 14 people on board operated by Summit Air Charters, was on approach at Cambridge Bay after a flight from Resolute Bay Airport when the aircraft collided with terrain about 1.5 nautical miles (2.8 km; 1.7 mi) short of runway 31. One flight crew member and one passenger received minor injuries.

== See also ==
- Cambridge Bay Water Aerodrome
