= Vintage Wings of Canada =

- Location: Gatineau, Quebec, Canada
- Coordinates: 45.5178°N 75.5638°W
- Type: Aviation Museum
- Director: Michael Potter
- Curator: Ryan Silverson (Hangar Systems Manager)
- Website: www.vintagewings.ca

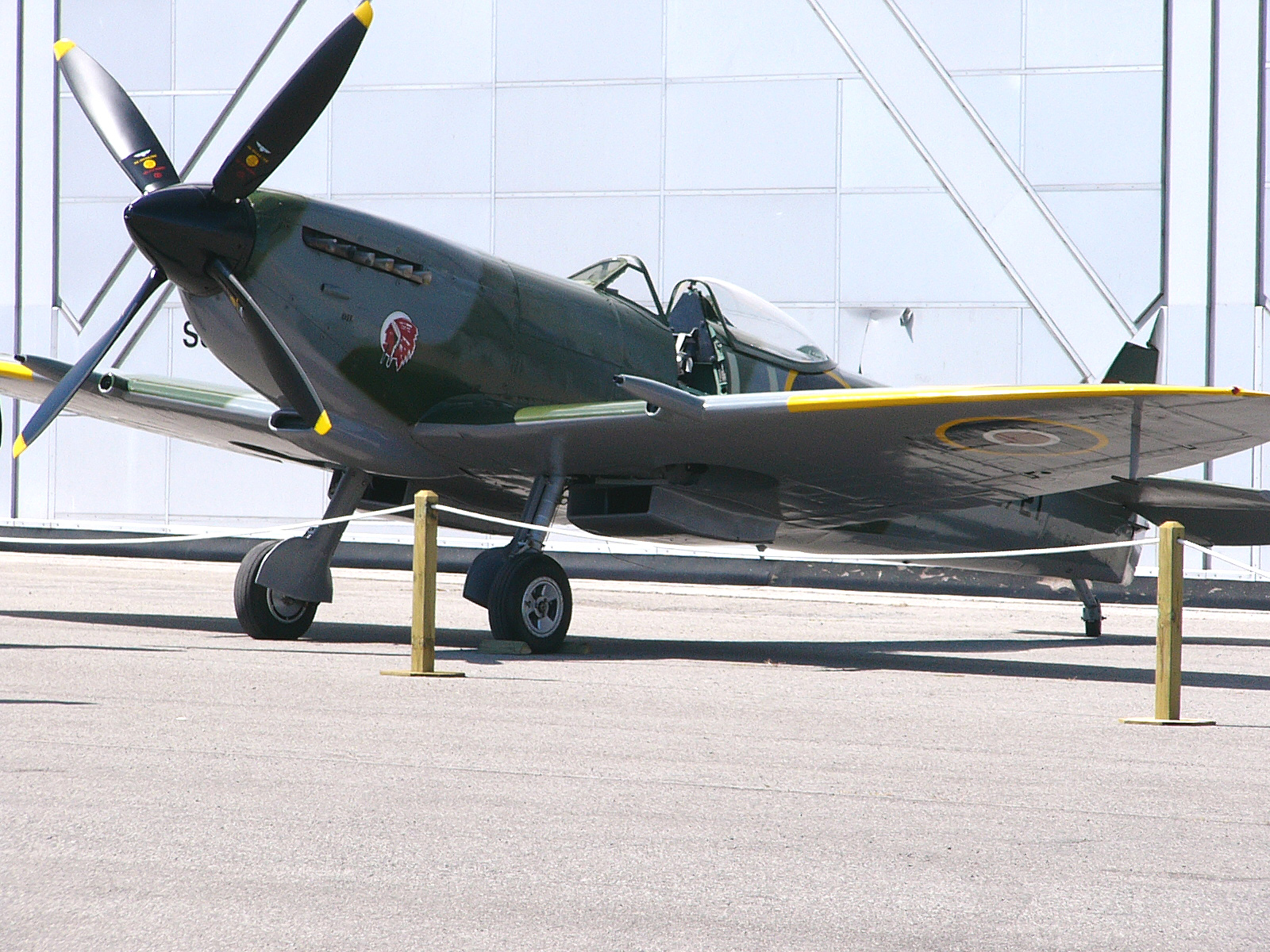
Vintage Wings Spitfire Mark XVI

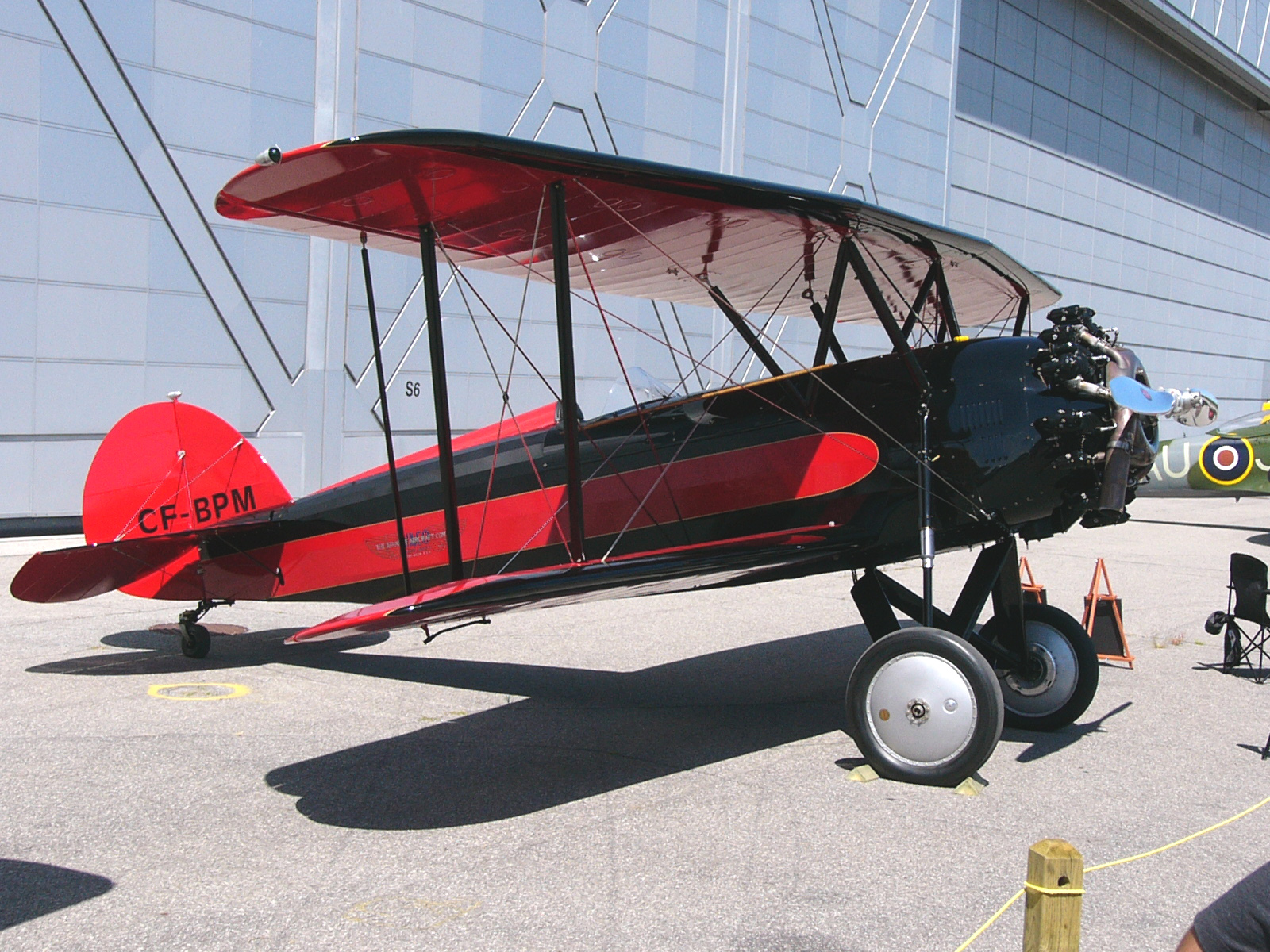
Advance Aircraft Company Taperwing ATO of Vintage Wings

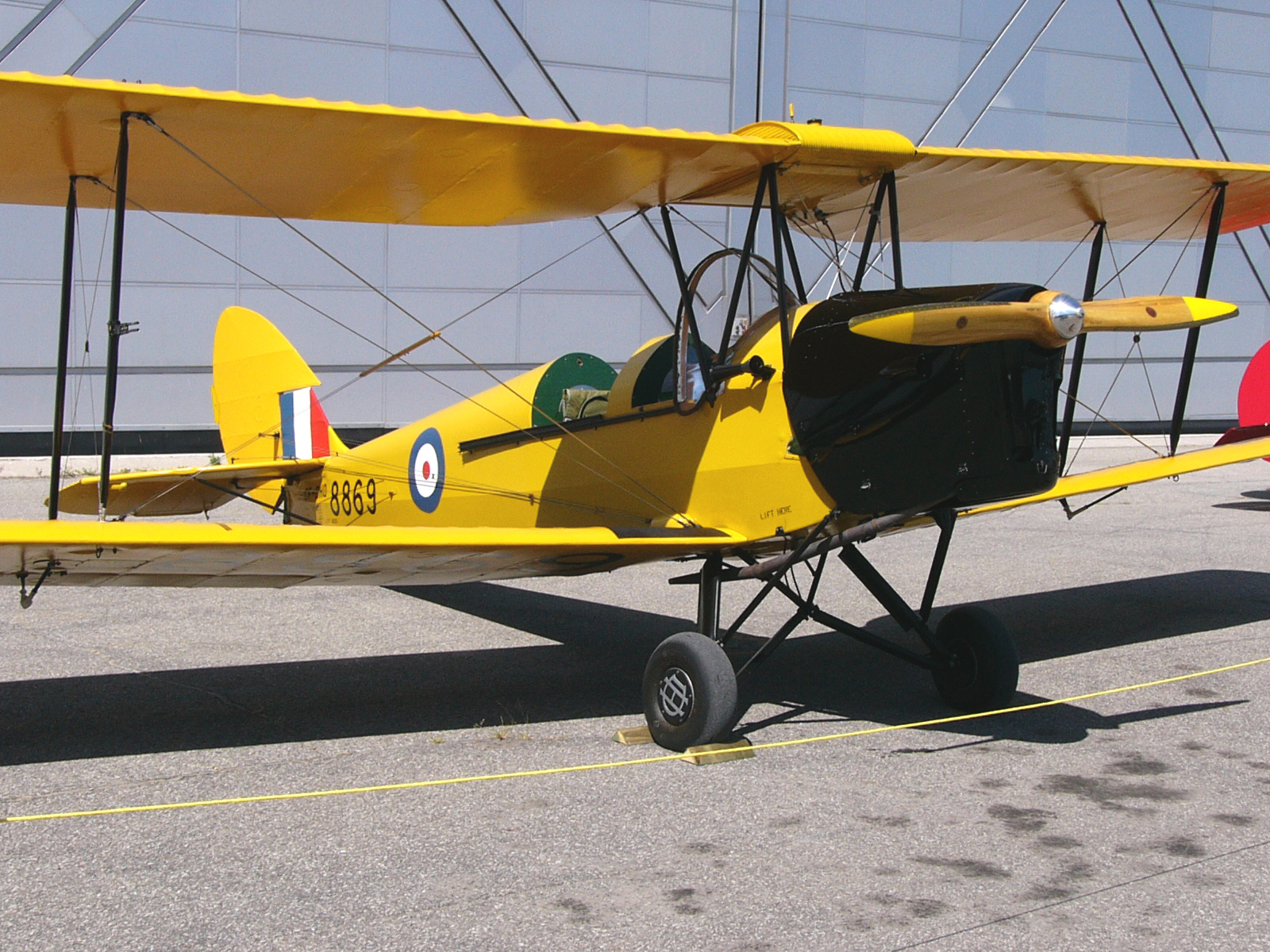
de Havilland DH 82C Tiger Moth of Vintage Wings

Vintage Wings of Canada is a not for profit, charitable organization, with a collection of historically significant aircraft. The facility is located at the Gatineau-Ottawa Executive Airport in Gatineau, Quebec, Canada. It was founded by former Cognos CEO and philanthropist Michael U. Potter. Most aircraft in the collection are in flying condition, or being restored to flying condition.

The facility is located in a 23,000 sq ft (2,100 m^{2}) hangar that was designed to resemble a wartime military hangar.

Vintage Wings is a flying museum, which displays its aircraft in the air and on the ground at many airshows and other events such as Royal Military College of Canada graduation parades, Battle of Britain Sunday parades and many other air shows in Canada and the USA.

== Mission ==
The organization states its mission as:

...to acquire, restore, maintain and fly classic aircraft significant to the early history of powered flight...It is our goal to inspire and educate future generations about the historical significance of our aviation heritage and to demonstrate that these aircraft are more than just metal, fabric, and wood artifacts. We seek to keep the souls of these aircraft alive through the thundering sound of engines, the smell of leather, glycol, oil and sweat, as well as the laughter of their pilots as they dance with them in their natural element in the skies over Canada.

== History ==
Vintage Wings was created by former Cognos CEO and founder Michael Potter, following his retirement from the company. After retiring Potter developed an interest in collecting "exotic vintage aircraft", starting in 2000. As the collection grew Potter decided to form a foundation to acquire, manage, maintain and fly the aircraft. Potter recruited a cadre of professional pilots, including a number from the Canadian Harvard Aircraft Association and the National Research Council Flight Test Laboratory, to assist in managing, displaying and flying the aircraft.

In November 2024, Potter announced that he was selling his personal collection of aircraft. However, Vintage Wings, which is a separate organization, would continue operating.

== Aircraft ==
Vintage Wings owns and operates many classic aircraft, most notably various Allied World War II era aircraft.

The aircraft owned by Vintage Wings are:

As of February 2023, Vintage Wings of Canada has three aircraft registered with Transport Canada and operate as ICAO airline designator GHK, and telephony GOLDEN HAWK.B List of aircraft operated in July 2022:

- de Havilland Canada DHC-1 Chipmunk – two, one of which is registered with Transport Canada
- de Havilland Canada DHC-2 Beaver
- de Havilland Fox Moth
- Fleet-built Fairchild Cornell
- Fleet 80 Canuck – registered with Transport Canada
- Fleet Finch II – Model 16B – registered with Transport Canada
- Hawker Hurricane XII
- Hawker Fury II (under restoration)
- North American Harvard Mk IV
- North American Mustang IV
- Westland Lysander IIIA
- Goodyear FG-1D Corsair
- Supermarine Spitfire Mk IX

Aircraft for sale, sold or no longer in the collection include:

- Beechcraft D17S Staggerwing (sold 2011)
- Bellanca Citabria
- Boeing Stearman
- Canadair Sabre Mk 5 in the markings of the Golden Hawks (up for sale in March 2017)
- Curtiss P-40N Kittyhawk
- de Havilland Canada DHC-2 Beaver
- de Havilland Tiger Moth
- Fairchild Cornell
- Fairey Swordfish Mk III
- Hawker Hurricane Mk IV
- Supermarine Spitfire Mk XVI
- Waco Taperwing ATO (sold in 2011)

== Accidents and incidents ==
The Vintage Wings de Havilland Tiger Moth crashed at the Gatineau Airport on 28 August 2009. The visiting English pilot, Howard Cook, received serious injuries in the accident. He was practicing for the Classic Air Rallye the next day when the aircraft suffered an engine problem and crashed 50 m (164 ft) from the airport runway.

== See also ==
- List of aviation museums
