= Manhattan Project feed materials program =

Program of the Manhattan Project to convert uranium ores into feed materials

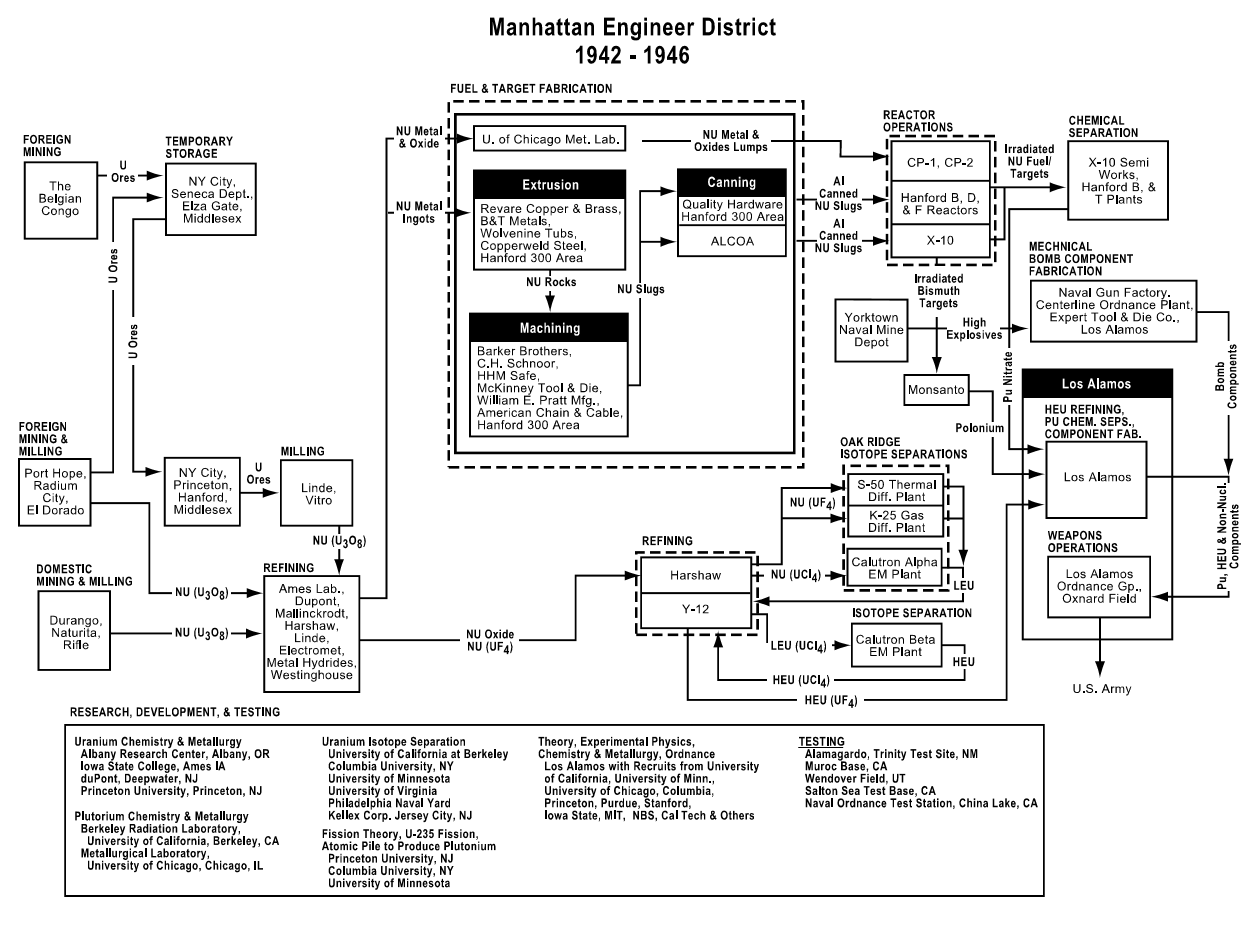
Chart describing the processing of uranium

The Manhattan Project feed materials program located and procured uranium ores, and refined and processed them into feed materials for use in the Manhattan Project's isotope enrichment plants at the Clinton Engineer Works in Oak Ridge, Tennessee, and its nuclear reactors at the Hanford Engineer Works in Washington state. The highly enriched uranium product of the enrichment plants and the plutonium from the reactors was used to make atomic bombs.

The original goal of the feed materials program in 1942 was to acquire approximately 1,500 metric tons (1,700 short tons) of triuranium octoxide (U_{3}O_{8}) (black oxide). By the time of the dissolution of the Manhattan District on 1 January 1947, it had acquired about 9,100 metric tons (10,000 short tons), 68.3% of which came from the Belgian Congo, 13.2% from the Colorado Plateau, and 11.1% from Canada. An additional 7.3% came from "miscellaneous sources", which included quantities recovered from Europe by the Manhattan Project's Alsos Mission.

Beyond their immediate wartime needs, the American and British governments attempted to control as much of the world's uranium deposits as possible. They created the Combined Development Trust in June 1944, with the director of the Manhattan Project, Major General Leslie R. Groves Jr. as its chairman. The Combined Development Trust procured uranium and thorium ores on international markets. A special account not subject to the usual auditing and controls was used to hold Trust monies. Between 1944 and his resignation from the Trust in 1947, Groves deposited a total of $37.5 million (equivalent to $685.85 million in 2025). In 1944, the Combined Development Trust purchased 3,440,000 pounds (1,560,000 kg) of uranium oxide ore from the Belgian Congo.

The raw ore was dissolved in nitric acid to produce uranyl nitrate, which was reduced to highly pure uranium dioxide. By July 1942, Mallinckrodt was producing a ton of oxide a day, but turning this into uranium metal initially proved more difficult. A branch of the Metallurgical Laboratory was established at Iowa State College in Ames, Iowa, under Frank Spedding to investigate alternatives. This became known as the Ames Project, and the Ames process it developed to produce uranium metal became available in 1943. Uranium metal was used to fuel the nuclear reactors. Uranium tetrachloride was produced as feed for the calutrons used in the Y-12 (electromagnetic) isotope separation process, and uranium hexafluoride for the K-25 (gaseous diffusion) separation process.

== Background ==
Uranium was discovered in 1789 by the German chemist and pharmacist Martin Heinrich Klaproth, who also established its useful commercial properties, such as its coloring effect on molten glass. It occurs in various ores, including pitchblende, torbernite, carnotite, and autunite. In the early 19th century it was recovered as a byproduct of mining other ores. Mining of uranium as the principal product began in Joachimsthal in Bohemia in about 1850, at the South Terras mine in Cornwall in 1873, and in Paradox Valley in Colorado in 1898.

Uranium-bearing minerals
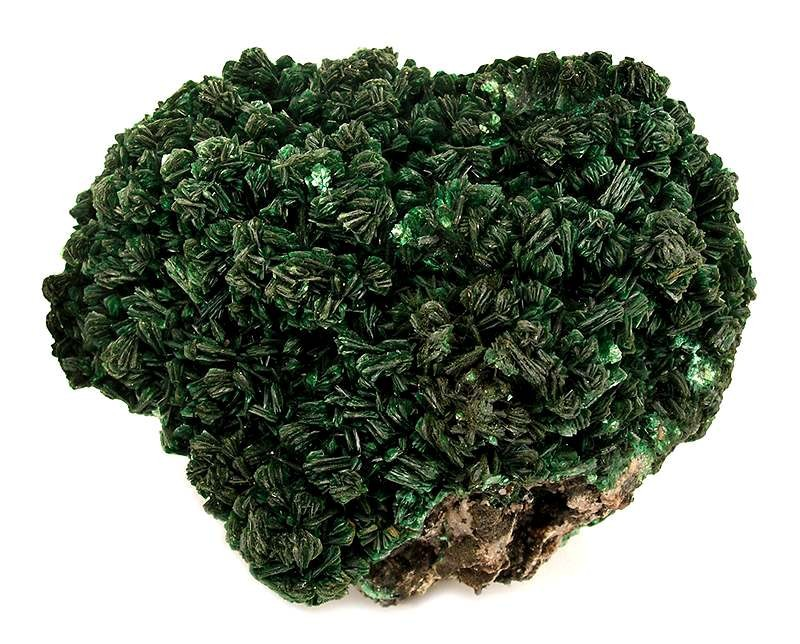
Torbernite from the Shinkolobwe mine in the Congo

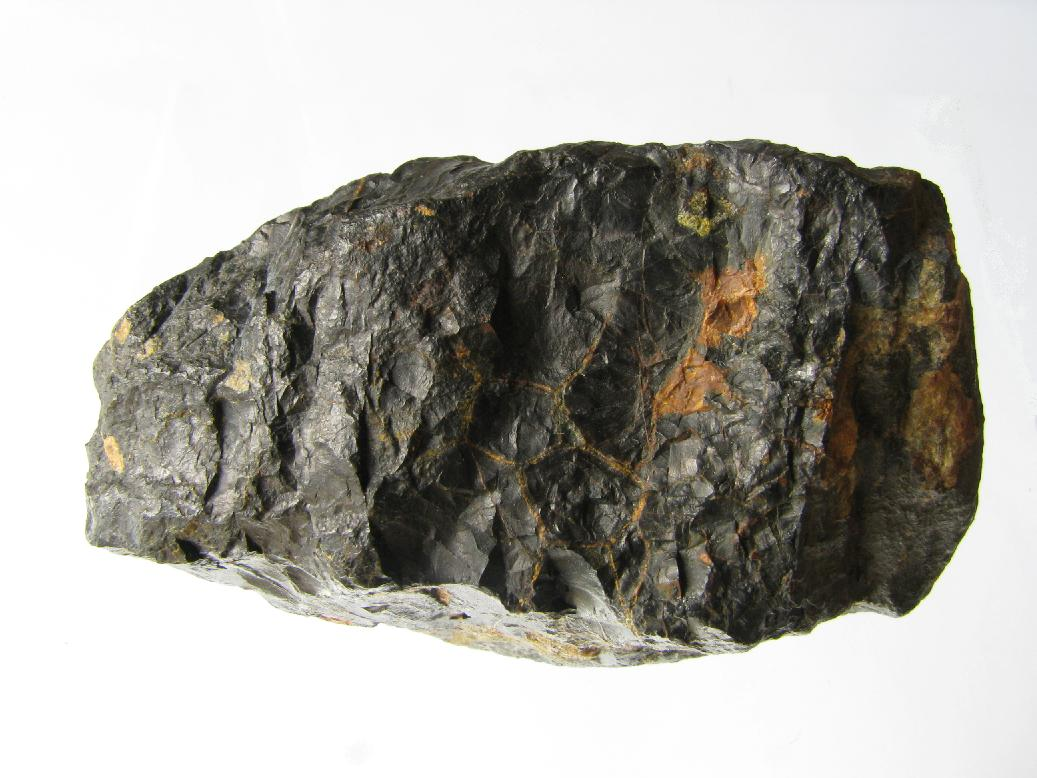
Pitchblende from Czechia

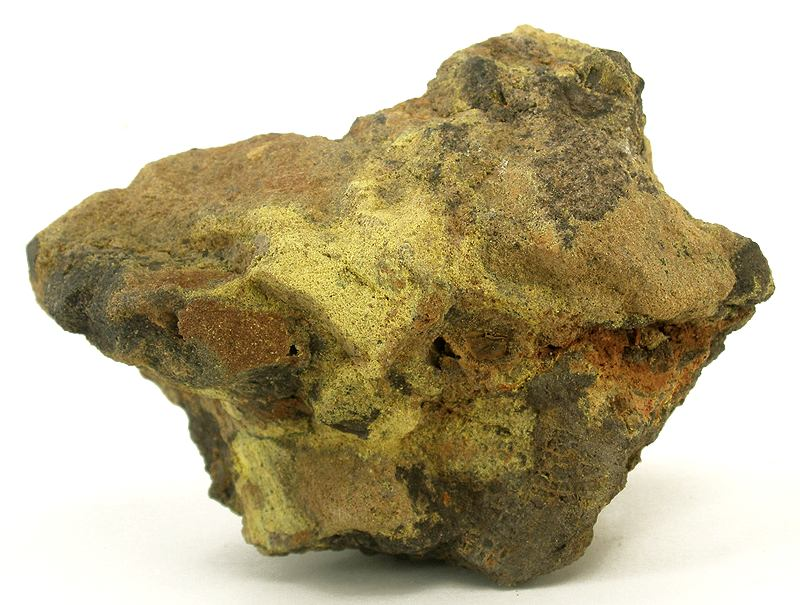
Carnotite from Uravan, Colorado, US

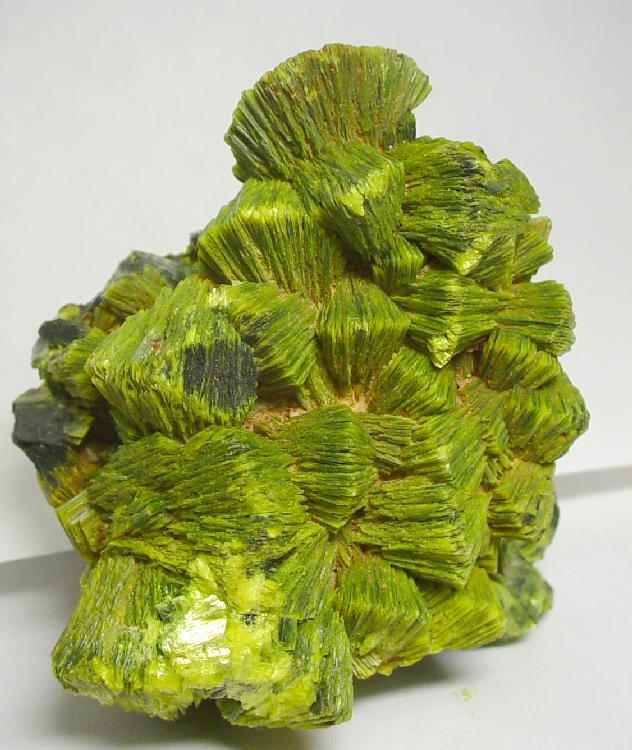
Autunite from Spokane County, Washington, US

A major deposit was found at Shinkolobwe in what was then the Belgian Congo in 1915, and extraction was begun by a Belgian mining company, Union Minière du Haut-Katanga, after the First World War. The first batch of uranium ore arrived in Belgium in December 1921. Only the richest uranium-bearing ore was exported to Olen, Belgium for the production of radium, a natural decay product of uranium, by Biraco, a subsidiary company of Union Minière du Haut Katanga. Uranium was an important export of Belgium from 1922 up until World War II.

The high grade of the ore from the mine—65% or more triuranium octoxide (U_{3}O_{8}), known as black oxide, when most sites considered 0.03% to be good—enabled the company to dominate the market. Even the 2,000 metric tons (2,200 short tons) of tailings from the mine considered too poor to bother processing contained up to 20% uranium ore. Black oxide was mainly used as a glaze in the ceramics industry, which consumed about 140 metric tons (150 short tons) annually as a coloring agent for uranium tiles and uranium glass, and in 1941 sold for US$4.52 per kilogram ($2.05/lb) (equivalent to $99/kg in 2025). Uranium nitrate (UO_{2}(NO_{3})_{2}) was used by the photographic industry, and sold for US$5.20 per kilogram ($2.36/lb) (equivalent to $114/kg in 2025). The market for uranium was quite small, and by 1937, Union Minière had thirty years' supply on hand, so the mining and refining operations at Shinkolobwe were terminated.

The discovery of nuclear fission by chemists Otto Hahn and Fritz Strassmann in December 1938, and its subsequent explanation, verification and naming by physicists Lise Meitner and Otto Frisch, opened up the possibility of uranium becoming an important new source of energy. In nature, uranium has three isotopes: uranium-238, which accounts for 99.28 percent; uranium-235, 0.71 percent; and uranium-234, less than 0.001 percent. In Britain, in June 1939, Frisch and Rudolf Peierls investigated the critical mass of uranium-235, and found that it was small enough to be carried by contemporary bomber aircraft, making an atomic bomb possible. Their March 1940 Frisch–Peierls memorandum initiated Tube Alloys, the British atomic bomb project.

In June 1942, Colonel James C. Marshall was selected to head the Army's part of the American atomic bomb project. He established his headquarters at 270 Broadway in New York City; Lieutenant Colonel Kenneth Nichols became his deputy. The United States Army Corps of Engineers is divided into divisions and the divisions into districts. Engineer districts normally carry the name of the place where their headquarters was located, so Marshall's command was called the Manhattan District. Unlike the other engineer districts, though, it had no geographic boundaries, and Marshall had the authority of a division engineer. Over time the entire project became known as "Manhattan". Brigadier General Leslie R. Groves became the director of the Manhattan Project in September 1942. Marshall remained the district engineer until 13 August 1943, when he was replaced by Nichols.

One of Groves's first concerns upon taking charge was securing the supply of raw materials, particularly uranium ore. At the time, there was insufficient uranium even for experimental purposes, and no idea how much would ultimately be required. As it turned out, a Little Boy gun-type fission weapon, using about 60 kilograms of highly enriched uranium, required 8,300 kilograms of natural uranium to produce in the isotope separation processes at the Clinton Engineer Works. A Fat Man implosion-type nuclear weapon used about 6 kilograms of plutonium, but this required the irradiation of about 24,000 kilograms of uranium slugs in the nuclear reactors at the Hanford Engineer Works.

== Organization ==
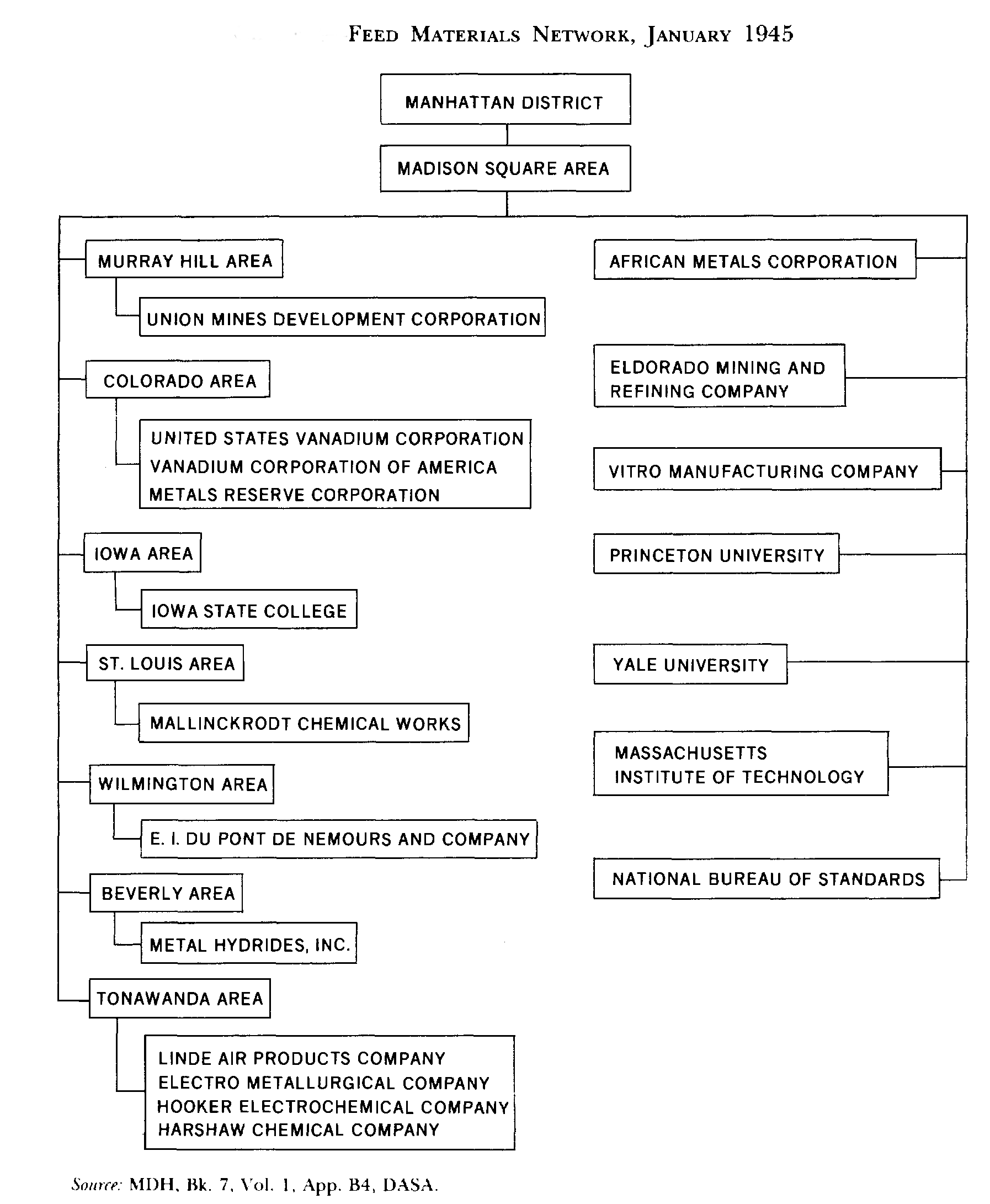
Feed Material Network - organization chart

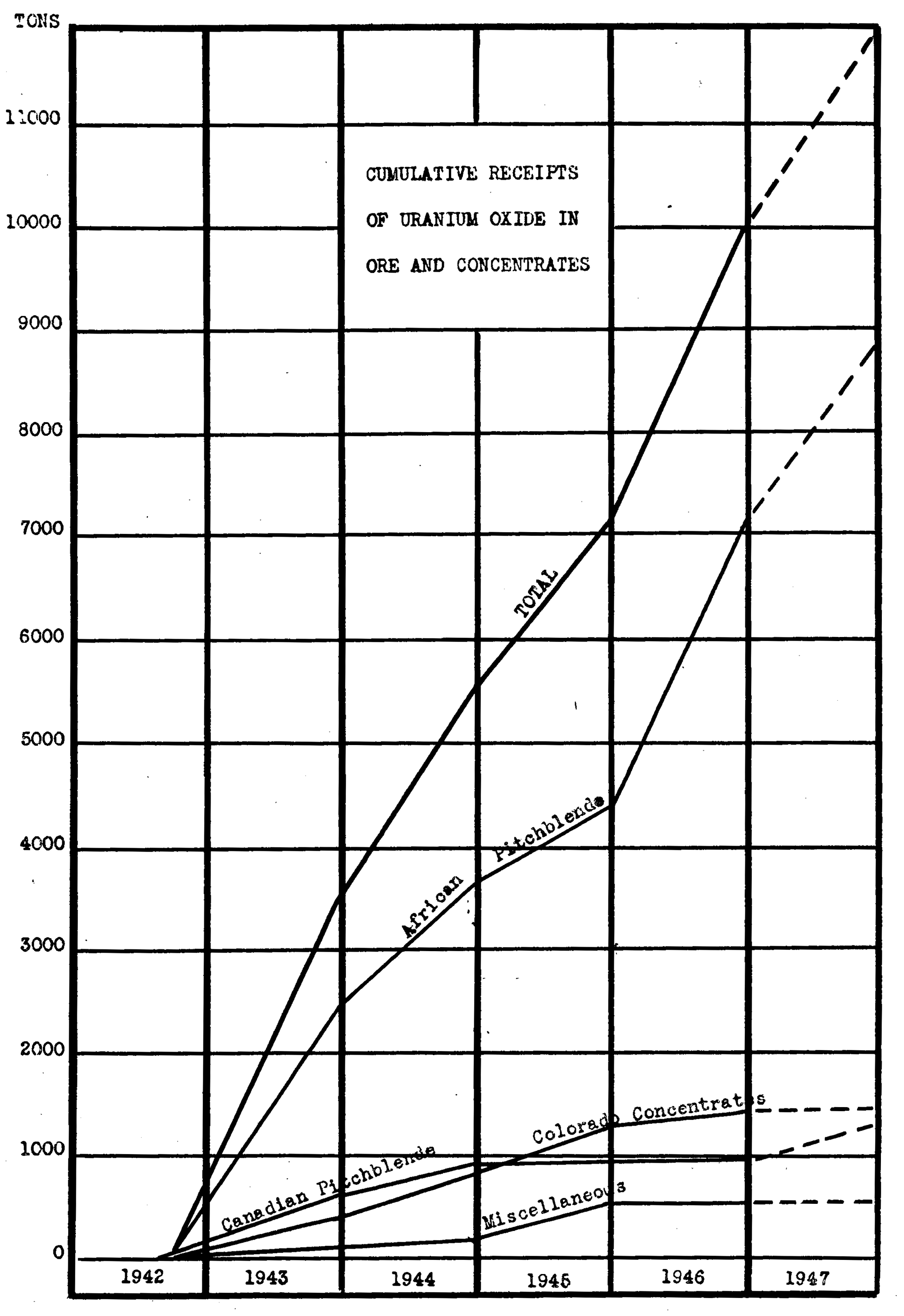
A graph showing the cumulative receipts of uranium oxide in ore and concentrates for the Manhattan Project (1942-1947). Numbers are in tons of uranium oxide.

Initially, the firm of Stone & Webster made arrangements for the procurement of feed materials, but as the project grew in scope, it was decided to have that company concentrate on the design and construction of the Y-12 electromagnetic plant, and arrangements for procurement and refining were handled by Marshall and Nichols.

In October 1942, Marshall established a Materials Section in the Manhattan District headquarters under Lieutenant Colonel Thomas T. Crenshaw Jr., an architect. To assist him, he had Captain Phillip L. Merritt, a geologist, and Captain John R. Ruhoff. Ruhoff was a chemical engineer who worked for Mallinckrodt. When he was inducted into the Army, Nichols had him assigned to the Manhattan District. As the district's St. Louis Area engineer, he had worked on uranium metal production. Crenshaw became the officer in charge of operations at the Clinton Engineer Works in Oak Ridge, Tennessee, in July 1943, and was succeeded as head of the Materials Section by Ruhoff, who was promoted to lieutenant colonel.

The following month, the Manhattan District's headquarters moved to Oak Ridge, but the Materials Section and its successors remained in New York until 1954. Nichols felt that this was a better location for it, as it was close to the ports of entry, warehouses for the ores and the headquarters of several of the firms supplying feed materials. He reorganized the section as the Madison Square Area; engineer areas are normally named after their location, and the office was located near Madison Square.

As area engineer, Ruhoff was responsible for nearly four hundred military and civilian personnel by 1944, of whom three-quarters were in New York. There were two field offices that were responsible for procurement: Murray Hill in New York and Colorado in Grand Junction, Colorado, and five responsible for feed materials processing: Iowa (in Ames, Iowa), St. Louis, Wilmington, Beverly and Tonawanda. Ruhoff was succeeded in October 1944 by Lieutenant Colonel W. E. Kelley, who in turn was succeeded by Lieutenant Colonel G. W. Beeler in April 1946.

The original goal of the feed materials program in 1942 was to acquire approximately 1,500 metric tons (1,700 short tons) of black oxide. By the time of the dissolution of the Manhattan District at the end of 1946, it had acquired about 9,100 tonnes (10,000 short tons). The total cost of the feed materials program up to 1 January 1947 was approximately US$90,268,490 (equivalent to $1,301,561,313 in 2025), of which $27,592,360 (equivalent to $397,848,112 in 2025) was for procurement of raw materials, $58,622,360 (equivalent to $845,262,791 in 2025) for refining and processing operations, and $3,357,690 (equivalent to $48,413,787 in 2025) for research, development, and quality control.

== Uranium procurement ==
The first objective of the feed materials program was to procure sufficient uranium-bearing raw materials for conversion into feed materials for the processing plants. The initial target was to procure 1,700 short tons (1,500 t) of black oxide by the middle of 1944.

=== Africa ===
==== Early activities ====
In May 1939, Edgar Sengier, the director of Union Minière, visited a fellow director, Lord Stonehaven, in London. Stonehaven arranged for Sengier to meet with Sir Henry Tizard and Major General Hastings Ismay. The Foreign Office had contacted Union Minière and discovered that the company had 59 metric tons (65 short tons) of uranium ore concentrate on hand in the UK, and that the going price was 6/4 per pound, or £19,000 (equivalent to $920,000 in 2025) for the lot. Another 180 metric tons (200 short tons) of refined uranium oxide was in Belgium. Sengier agreed to consider moving this stockpile from Belgium to the UK. In the meantime, the British government bought a ton of ore from Union Minière's London agents for £709/6/8 (equivalent to $34,334 in 2025). As Sengier left the meeting, Tizard warned him: "Be careful and never forget that you have in your hands something that may mean a catastrophe to your country and mine if this material were to fall into the hands of a possible enemy."

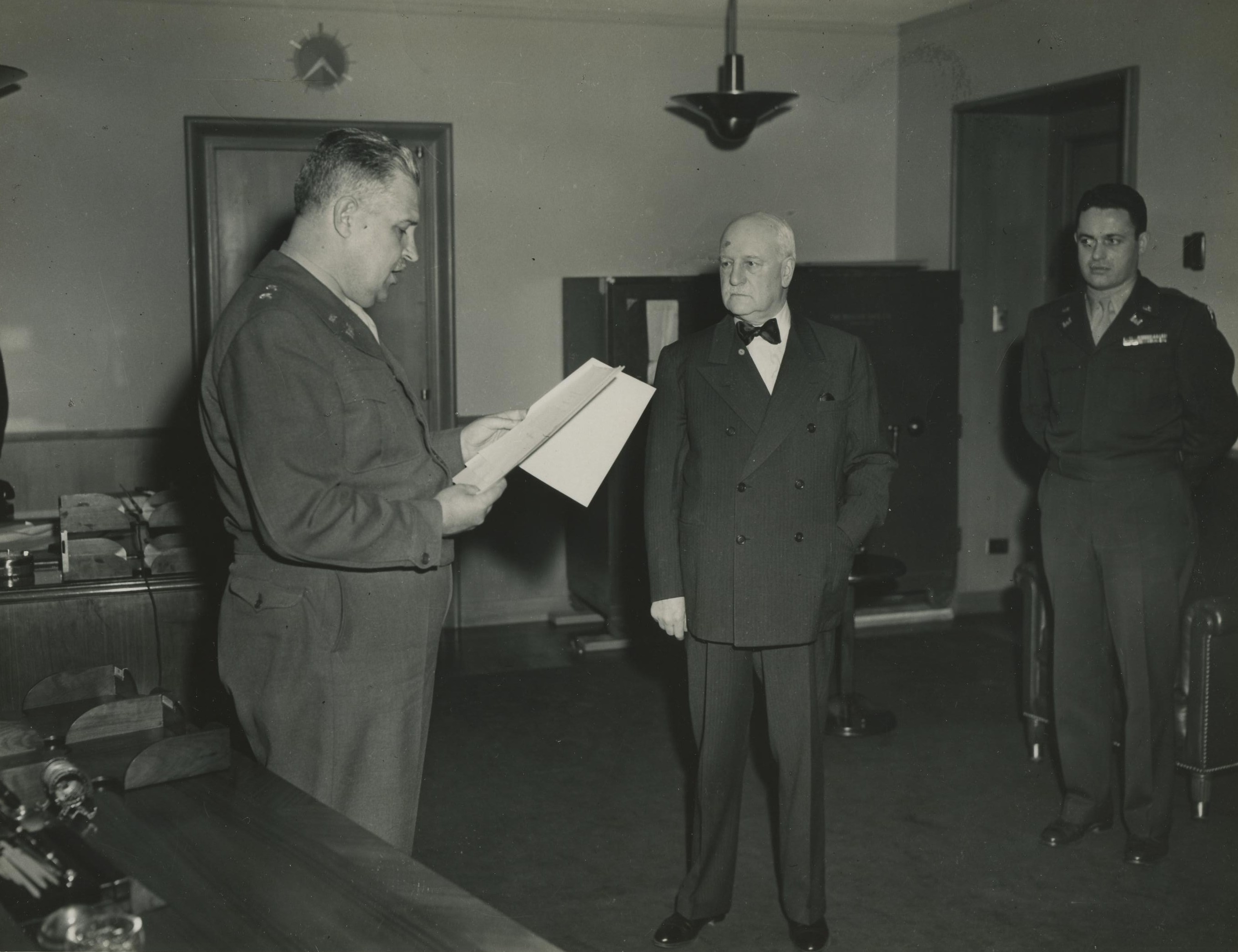
Major General Leslie R. Groves Jr. (left) awards Edgar Sengier (center) the Medal for Merit for his contribution to the war effort.

The possibility that Belgium might be invaded was taken seriously. In September 1939, Sengier left for New York with authority to conduct business should contact be lost between Belgium and the Congo. Before he departed, he made arrangements for the radium and uranium at the company's refining plant in Olen, Belgium, to be shipped to the Great Britain and the United States. The radium, about 120 grams, valued at $1.8 million (equivalent to $41.37 million in 2025) arrived, but 3,200 metric tons (3,500 short tons) of uranium compounds was not shipped before Belgium was overrun by the Germans in May 1940.

In August 1940, Sengier, fearing a German takeover of the Belgian Congo, ordered some of the stockpile of uranium ore there to be shipped to the United States through Union Minière's subsidiary, African Metals Corporation. Some 1,139 metric tons (1,256 short tons) of uranium ore was shipped via Lobito in Angola to New York in two shipments: the first, of 470 metric tons (460 long tons) departed Lobito in September and arrived in New York in November; the second, of 669 metric tons (658 long tons), departed in October and arrived in December. The ore was stored in 2,006 steel drums 86 centimeters (34 in) high and 64 centimeters (25 in) in diameter, labelled "uranium ore" and "product of Belgian Congo", in a warehouse in Port Richmond, Staten Island, belonging to the Archer-Daniels-Midland Company.

In March 1942, a few months after the United States entered World War II, Sengier was invited to a meeting co-sponsored by the State Department, Metals Reserve Company, Raw Materials Board and the Board of Economic Warfare to discuss non-ferrous metals. He met with Thomas K. Finletter and Herbert Feis, but found them interested only in cobalt and not uranium; the State Department would not be informed of the Manhattan Project until the Yalta Conference in February 1945. At its 9 July meeting, the S-1 Executive Committee of the Office of Scientific Research and Development (OSRD), which was in charge of the American atomic project, saw no immediate need for additional quantities of uranium ore beyond 60 short tons (54 t) it had ordered from the Eldorado Gold Mines Company in Canada. In August, though, it learned that Boris Pregel, an agent for both Union Minière and Eldorado, was seeking to buy 500 short tons (450 t) of Sengier's ore, and he had applied for an export license to ship it to Eldorado for refining. The S-1 Executive Committee realized that the ore it was paying to be mined and shipped from the Arctic might instead be coming from Staten Island. On 11 September, Vannevar Bush, the head of the OSRD, asked the Army to impose export controls on uranium.

==== The US Army takes over ====
Events began to move swiftly once the Army became involved. On 15 September 1942, Ruhoff secured Sengier's approval for the release of 100 short tons (91 t) of ore, which was shipped to Eldorado's refinery at Port Hope, Ontario, for testing of the oxide content. Nichols met with Sengier in the latter's office at 25 Broadway on 18 September, and the two men reached an eight-sentence agreement that Nichols recorded on a yellow legal pad, giving Sengier a carbon copy. Under this agreement, the United States agreed to buy the ore in storage on Staten Island and was granted prior rights to purchase the 3,000 short tons (2,700 t) in the Belgian Congo, which would be shipped, stored and refined at the US government's expense. African Metals would retain ownership of the radium in the ore. At a meeting on 23 September, they agreed on a price: US$1.60 per pound ($3.5/kg) (equivalent to $69/kg in 2025), of which $1 would go to African Metals and 60 cents to Eldorado for refining. Sengier opened a special bank account to receive the payments, which the Federal Reserve was instructed to ignore and auditors instructed to accept without question. Contracts were signed on 19 October.

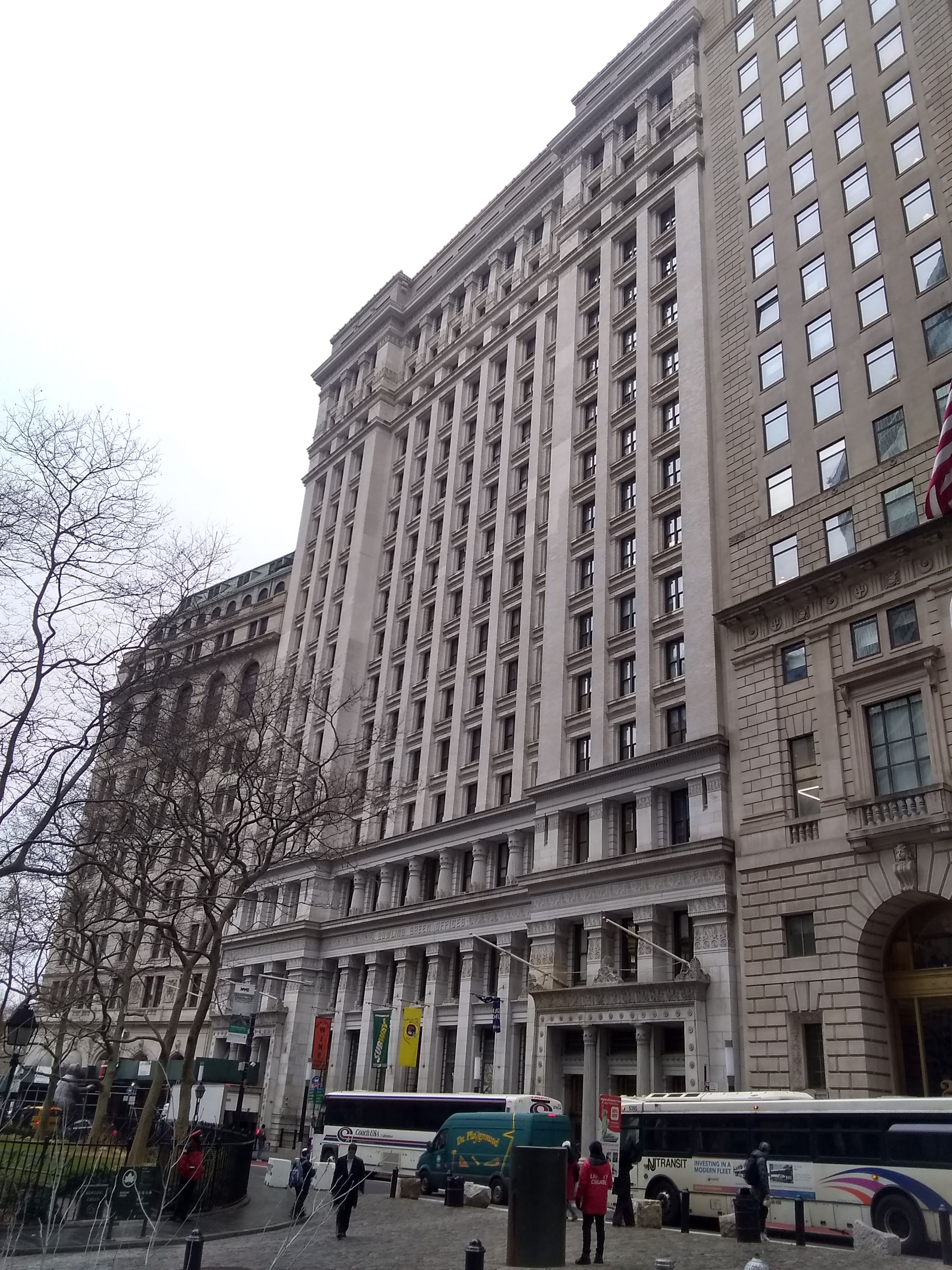
Cunard Building at 25 Broadway, where Sengier had his office

The ore in Staten Island was transferred to the Seneca Ordnance Depot in Romulus, New York, for safe keeping. Meanwhile, arrangements were made to ship the ore from the Belgian Congo. The Shinkolobwe mine had been closed since 1937, and had fallen into disrepair and flooded. The United States Army Corps of Engineers restored the mine, expanded the aerodromes in Léopoldville and Elisabethville, improved railroads and built a port in Matadi, Congo's single outlet to the sea. The army also secured the remaining ore in Shinkolobwe. As the port of Lobito in neutral Angola was considered a security risk, all uranium transported by sea from the last week of January 1943 was routed through Matadi in sealed barrels marked "Special Cobalt." The uranium was first sent north by train from Shinkolobwe to the railhead at Port-Francqui (now Ilebo) on the Kasai River. From there, the sealed barrels were loaded onto barges to be transported to Léopoldville (now known as Kinshasa), where they were taken by train to Matadi.

Sengier thought it would be safer for the ore to be shipped in 16-knot (30 km/h) freighters that could outrun the German U-boats rather than in convoy. This was accepted, and the first shipment, of 250 metric tons (250 long tons), departed on 10 October, followed by a second on 20 October and a third on 10 November. The shipments were managed by the American West African Line, which ran a service between New York and Matadi. Uranium for the Manhattan Project was also transported by air on the Pan American Airways clipper service. The Brazil–West Africa air link was extended to reach Leopoldville, primarily to gain access to uranium from what was then the Belgian Congo. Thereafter, ore was shipped at a rate of 410 metric tons (400 long tons) per month from December 1942 to May 1943. Two shipments were lost, one to a U-boat in late 1942, and one due to a maritime accident in early 1943. About 180 metric tons (200 short tons) was lost. The ore arrived faster than it could be processed, so it was stored at Seneca. Later shipments were temporarily stored at the Clinton Engineer Works. In November 1943, the Middlesex Sampling Plant in Middlesex, New Jersey, was leased for storage, sampling and assaying. The ore was received in bags and sent for refining as required.

In August 1943, Winston Churchill and Franklin Roosevelt negotiated the Quebec Agreement, which merged the British and American atomic bomb projects, and established the Combined Policy Committee to coordinate their efforts. In turn, the Combined Policy Committee created the Combined Development Trust on 13 June 1944 to procure uranium and thorium ores on international markets and secure as much as possible of the world's supply to prevent it falling into the wrong hands. Groves was appointed its chairman, with Sir Charles Hambro, the head of the British Raw Materials Mission in Washington, and Frank Lee from the Treasury delegation as the British trustees, and George Bateman, a deputy minister and a member of the Combined Production and Resources Board, representing Canada. In 1944, the Combined Development Trust purchased 1,560,000 kilograms (3,440,000 lb) of uranium oxide ore from the Belgian Congo. A special account not subject to the usual auditing and controls was used to hold Trust monies. Between 1944 and his resignation from the Trust at the end of 1947, Groves deposited a total of $37.5 million (equivalent to $685.85 million in 2025).

In the autumn of 1943, Groves attempted to have the Shinkolobwe mine re-opened and its output sold to the United States. Sengier reported that the mine could yield another 9,100 metric tons (10,000 short tons) of ore containing 50 to 60 percent oxide, but restarting production required new equipment, electricity to pump out the flooded mine, and assembling a workforce, which would take 18 to 20 months. Mine repairs and dewatering cost about $350,000 and another $200,000 was required to divert electricity away from copper mines. As 30 percent of the stock in Union Minière were held by British shareholders and the Belgian Government in Exile was in London, the British took the lead in negotiations. Negotiations took much longer than anticipated, but Sir John Anderson and the United States Ambassador to the United Kingdom, John Winant, hammered out a deal in May 1944 with Sengier and the Belgian Government in Exile for the mine to be reopened and 1,560 metric tons (1,720 short tons) of ore to be purchased, and the contract was signed on 25 September 1944. The agreement between the United States, the United Kingdom, and Belgium lasted ten years and financed the development of nuclear energy in Belgium.

==== Post-war ====
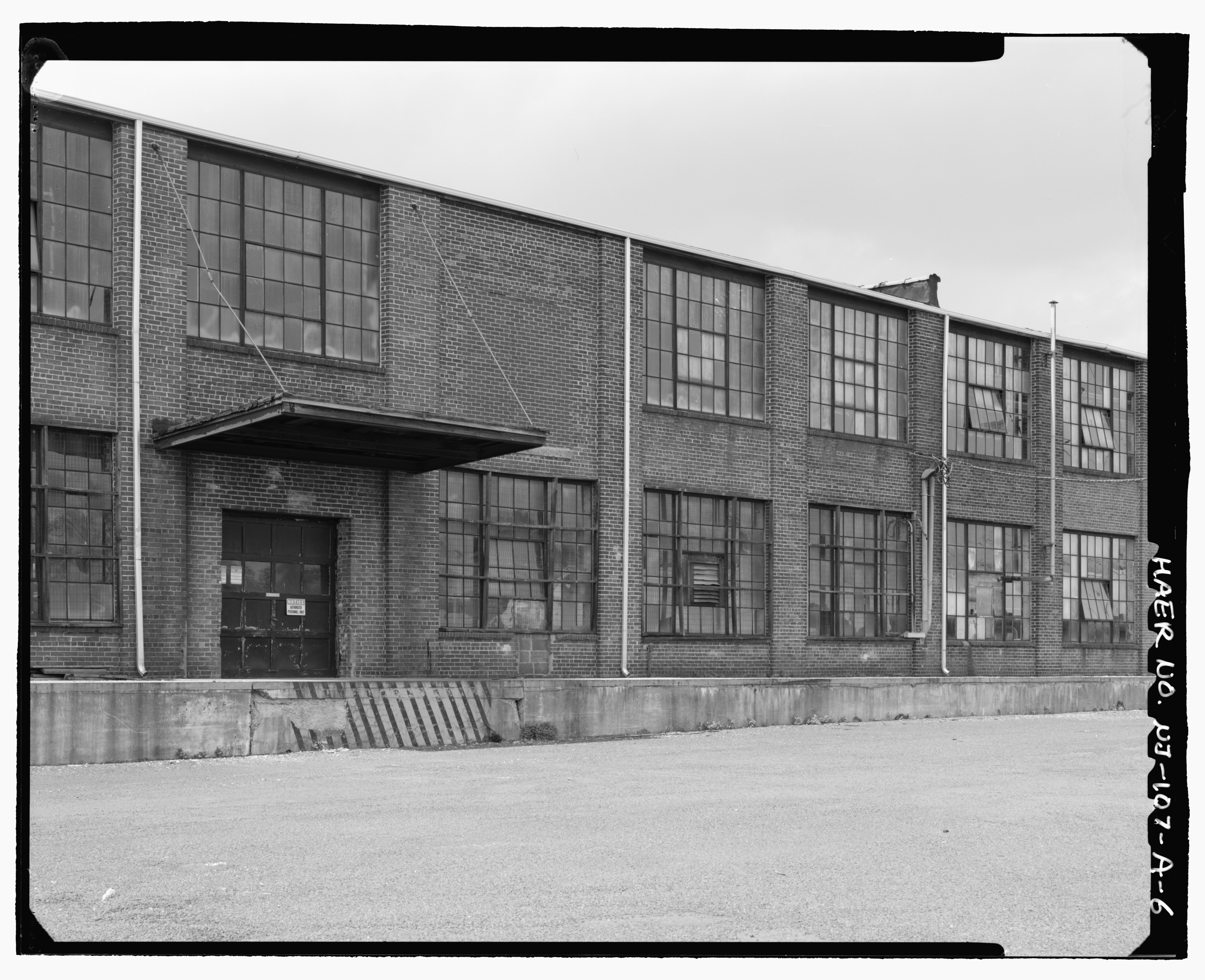
Boiler and process buildings at the Middlesex Sampling Plant

During the war, all uranium from the Congo had gone to the United States, as had that captured in Europe by the Alsos Mission, although some of it passed through British hands. The entire output of Shinkolobwe was contracted to the Combined Development Trust until 1956, but in March 1946 there were (unrealized) fears that the mine might be exhausted in 1947, resulting in a severe uranium shortage. After some negotiation, Groves and James Chadwick, the head of the British Mission to the Manhattan Project, agreed on a division of uranium ore production, with everything up to March 1946 going to the United States, and supplies being shared equally thereafter. Between VJ-Day and 31 March 1946, ore containing 770 metric tons (850 short tons) of oxide was delivered to the US and UK. Production then picked up as the effect of new machinery was felt, and from 1 April to 1 July 1,786 metric tons (1,969 short tons) of oxide was delivered.

At the Combined Policy Committee meeting on 31 July 1946, the financial arrangements were adjusted. Previously, the two countries had split the costs equally; henceforth each would pay for only what they received. Britain was therefore able to secure the uranium it needed for High Explosive Research, its own nuclear weapons program, without having to outbid the United States, and paid for it in sterling. Meanwhile, because the adjustment applied retrospectively to VJ-Day, it received reimbursement for the supplies allocated to Britain but given to the United States, thus easing Britain's dollar shortage. Although Union Minière would have preferred payment in dollars, it had to accept half in sterling.

By 1 January 1947, when the United States Atomic Energy Commission took over from the Manhattan Project, approximately 3,501 metric tons (3,859 short tons) of black oxide had been extracted from about 26,974 metric tons (29,734 short tons) of African ore, for which the government paid $9,113,800 (equivalent to $131,409,858 in 2025). Another 2,852 metric tons (3,144 short tons) of black oxide in ore had been obtained by the Washington Office for approximately $10,267,000 (equivalent to $148,037,593 in 2025). Radium-bearing sludge remaining after the refining process remained the property of African Metals and was returned to the company after the war. Residues from low-grade ores were stored at the Lake Ontario Ordnance Works, which was near the Linde Air Products Company plant where low-grade ores were refined. By 1 January 1947, 18,333 metric tons (20,209 short tons) of sludge was stored there, and 1,492 metric tons (1,645 short tons) had been returned to African Metals.

=== Canada ===
==== Eldorado mine ====
After the Belgian Congo, the next most important source of uranium ore was Canada. Canadian ore came from the Eldorado Mine in the Great Bear Lake area, not far south of the Arctic Circle. This was worked by Eldorado Gold Mines, a firm co-founded by Gilbert LaBine and his brother Charlie. Eldorado also established a processing plant at Port Hope, Ontario, the only one of its kind in North America. To run it, LaBine hired Marcel Pochon, a French chemist who had learned how to refine radium under Pierre Curie. Ore was mined at Port Radium and shipped via the Great Bear, Mackenzie and Slave Rivers to Waterways, Alberta, and thence by rail to Port Hope. The Great Bear Lake is only navigable between early July and early October, being icebound the rest of the year, but mining activity continued year-round, sustained by the Eldorado Radium Silver Express, which brought personnel and supplies to the mine and transported ores back by air.

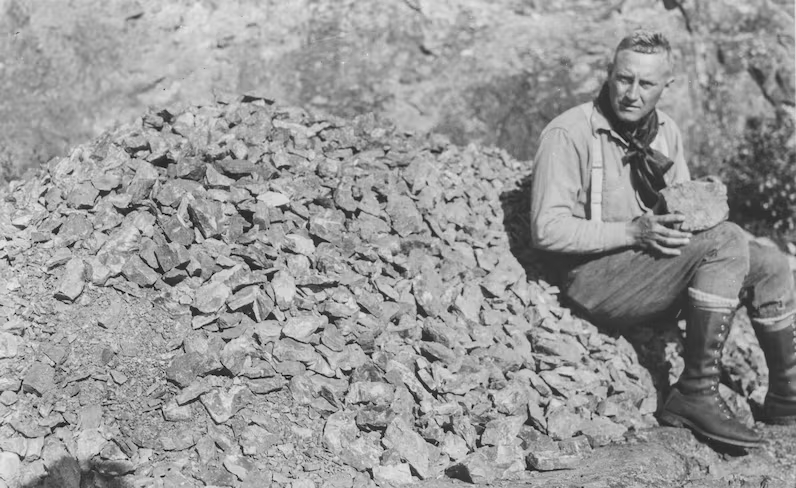
Gilbert LaBine examines uranium ore at the Eldorado Mine

Competition from Union Minière was fierce and served to drive the price of radium down from CAD$70 per milligram in 1930 (equivalent to $1,263 in 2025) to CAD$21 per milligram in 1937 (equivalent to $448 in 2025). Boris Pregel negotiated a cartel deal with Union Minière under which each company gained exclusive access to its home market and split the rest of the world 60:40 in Union Minière's favor. The outbreak of war in September 1939 blocked access to hard-won European markets and Union Minière lost its refinery at Olen when Belgium was overrun, forcing it to use Eldorado's mill at Port Hope. With sufficient stocks on hand for five years of operations, Eldorado closed the mine in June 1940.

On 15 June 1942, Malcolm MacDonald, the United Kingdom high commissioner to Canada, George Paget Thomson from the University of London and Michael Perrin from Tube Alloys met with Mackenzie King, the Prime Minister of Canada, and briefed him on the atomic bomb project. A subsequent meeting was arranged that same day at which the trio met with C. D. Howe, the Minister for Munitions and Supply and C. J. Mackenzie, the president of the National Research Council Canada. The British had noticed how uranium prices had been rising and feared that Pregel would attempt to corner the market, and they urged that Eldorado be brought under government control. Mackenzie proposed to effect this through secret purchase of the stock. Howe then met with Gilbert LaBine, who agreed to sell his 1,000,303 shares at CDN$1.25 per share (equivalent to $23 in 2025). This was a good deal for LaBine; the stock was trading at 40 cents a share at the time, but the stock only amounted to a quarter of the company's four million shares.

Complex negotiations followed between the Americans, British and Canadians regarding patent rights, export controls, and the exchange of scientific information, but the purchase was approved when Churchill and Roosevelt met at the Second Washington Conference in June 1942. Over the next eighteen months, LaBine and John Proctor from the Imperial Bank of Canada crisscrossed North America buying up stock in Eldorado Gold Mines, which changed its name to the more accurate Eldorado Mining and Refining on 3 June 1943. On 28 January 1944, Howe announced in the House of Commons of Canada that Eldorado had become a crown corporation, and the remaining shareholders would be reimbursed at CSN$1.35 a share. Many shareholders had paid considerably more, but the government insisted that this was fair price, as the final market price was CDN$1.31 per share.

Shortly after the nationalization of Eldorado Gold Mines, the Canadian government initiated an investigation into the company's historical management practices and operations that yielded evidence suggesting fraudulent activities. As a result, in February 1946, Marcel Pochon, financial director Carl French, and Boris Pregel were charged with criminal conspiracy and fraud. They were alleged to have misappropriated funds from Eldorado through a network of secretly controlled companies. However, the criminal proceedings against Pochon, French, and Pregel were discontinued. This decision was reportedly driven by the Canadian government's desire to avoid public disclosure of potentially sensitive wartime transactions. The terms of any settlement reached with Eldorado remained confidential. Related scrutiny also brought to light reports that Pregel, operating with US government authorization, had facilitated the sale of 230 kg (500 pounds) of uranium oxide to the Soviet Union during the war period. This transaction indicated that the distribution of Canadian uranium was not solely confined to the Manhattan Project. In March 1943, 680 kilograms (1,500 lb) of uranium was supplied to the Soviet Union under Lend-Lease. Groves felt that declining the Soviet request for uranium would have signaled that the United States was engaged in developing an atomic bomb.

==== Production ====
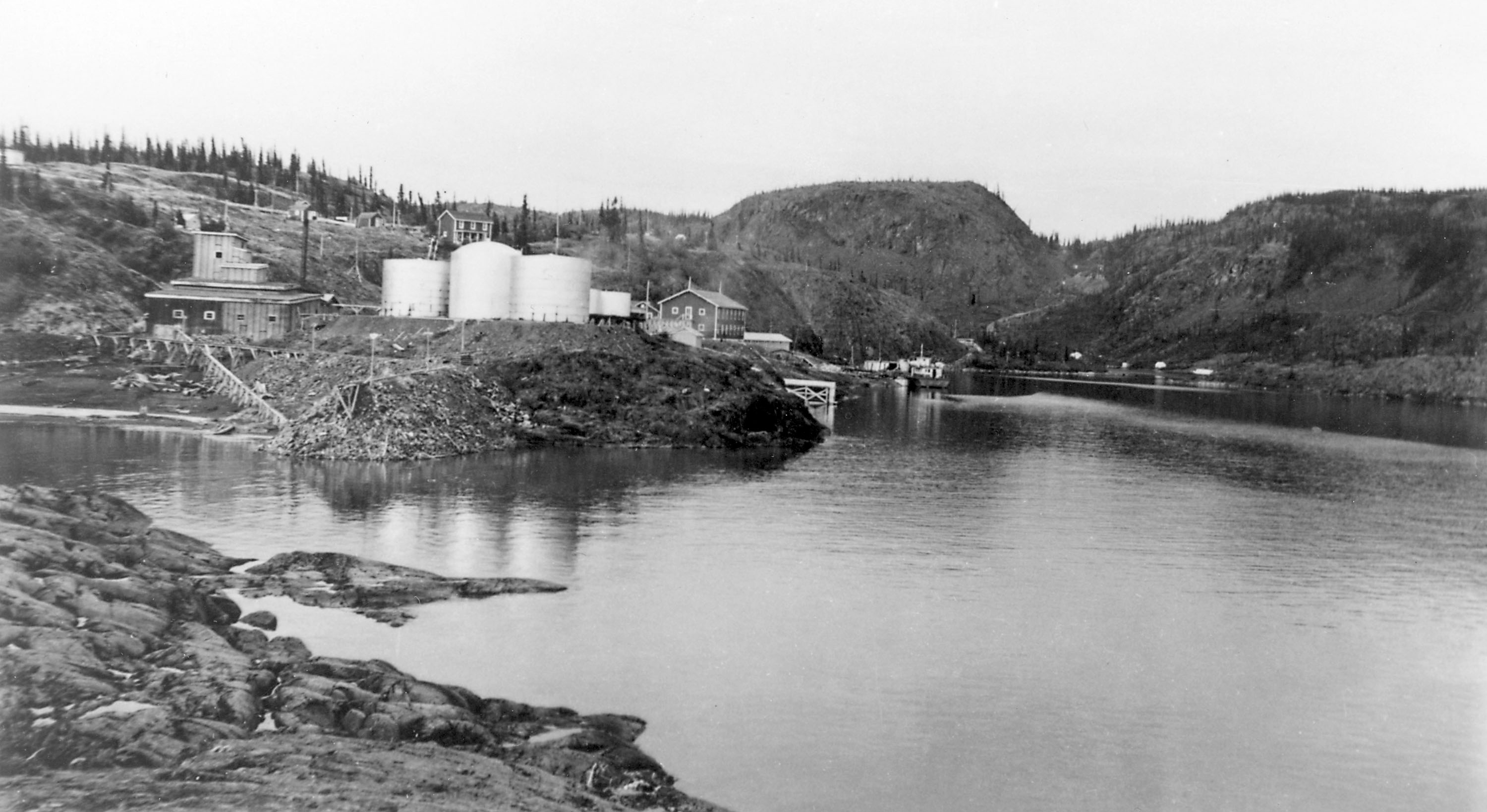
Port Radium in 1936

The first order, for 7.3 tonnes (8 short tons) of oxide, was placed with Eldorado by the S-1 Committee in 1941. This was increased to 54 tonnes (60 short tons), of which the committee estimated that 41 tonnes (45 short tons) was required in 1942 to fuel the experimental nuclear reactors at the University of Chicago. Commencing in May 1942, the mill began shipping 14 tonnes (15 short tons) per month. On 16 July, Preger negotiated a deal for the Americans to buy 320 tonnes (350 short tons) at CAD$6.3 per kilogram ($2.85/lb) (equivalent to CAD$115/kg in 2025).

Nor was this the end of it: on 22 December, Preger's Canadian Radium and Uranium Corporation placed an order for another 450 tonnes (500 short tons). This meant not only that the mine would be reopened, but that it would be fully occupied with American orders until the end of 1944. The British now became alarmed: they had allowed 18 tonnes (20 short tons) of oxide earmarked for them to be diverted to the Americans, whose need was more pressing, but were now faced with being shut out entirely, with no uranium for the Montreal Laboratory's reactor. The issue was resolved by the Quebec Agreement in August 1943.

Ed Bolger, who had been the mine superintendent from 1939 to 1940, led the effort to reactivate the mine in April 1942. He arrived by air with an advance party of 25 and supplies, flown in by Canadian Pacific Air Lines. Some ore had been abandoned on the docks when the mine was closed, and could be shipped immediately, but reactivation was complicated. The mine had filled with water that had to be pumped out, and the water had rotted the timbers. One raise was filled with helium. To thaw out the rock, electric heaters were brought in and ventilation was reduced, but this exposed the mine workers to a build up of radioactive radon gas. Bolger sought out the richest deposits and worked them first; in one vein, the oxide content was as high as 5%, but monthly production consistently fell short of targets, falling from a high of 73,000 tonnes (80,000 short tons) in August 1943 to 16,741 tonnes (18,454 short tons) in December.

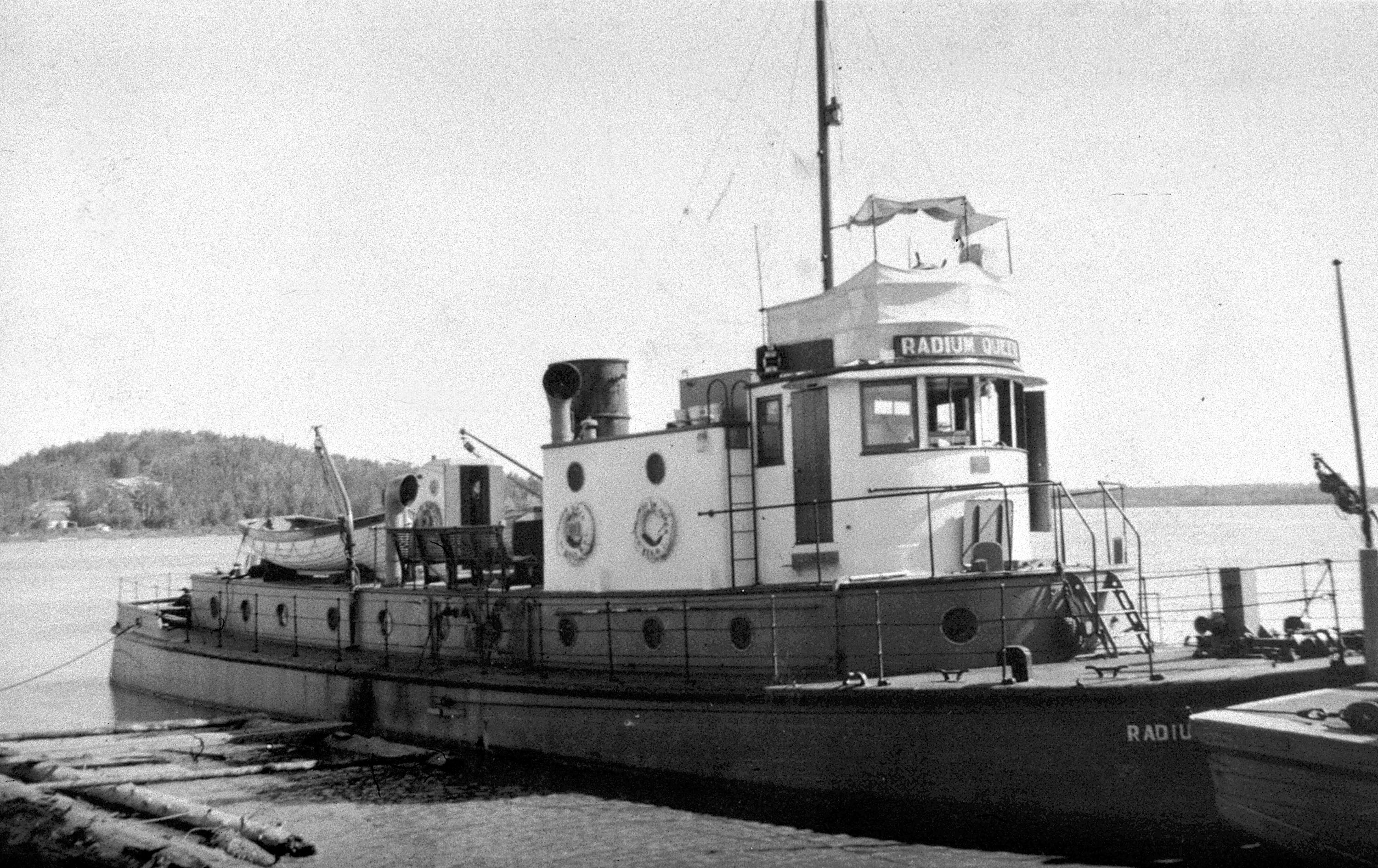
The Radium Queen at the dock in July 1937

Each season, some 1,100 to 1,300 tonnes (1,200 to 1,400 short tons) of freight was delivered to Port Radium by water, along with 2,300 to 2,700 tonnes (2,500 to 3,000 short tons) of oil for the diesel generators from Norman Wells on the Mackenzie River. Shipping supplies by water from Waterways cost $0.11 per kilogram ($0.05/lb) (equivalent to $2/kg in 2025), while air freight from Edmonton cost $1.5 per kilogram ($0.70/lb) (equivalent to $27/kg in 2025). LaBine asked the Americans to expedite the delivery of two new Lockheed Model 18 Lodestar aircraft to Canadian Pacific. United States and Canadian military aircraft were used to move ore from Port Radium to Waterways. In 1943, 270 tonnes (300 short tons) of ore was moved by air. LaBine was also able to get some personnel released from the Canadian armed forces. By 1944, Eldorado had a work force of 230.

By 1 January 1947, the Manhattan District had contracted from Eldorado for 3,755 tonnes (4,139 short tons) of ore concentrates to be delivered as 1,031 tonnes (1,137 short tons) of black oxide at a cost of approximately US$5,082,300 (equivalent to $73,280,555 in 2025).

=== United States ===
Vanadium and uranium processing at the Vanadium Corporation of America mill in Naturita, Colorado

In the United States, carnotite ores were mined on the Colorado Plateau for their vanadium content. The ores contained roughly 1.75% vanadium pentoxide (V_{2}O_{5}) and 0.25% uranium dioxide (UO_{2}). Vanadium was important to the war effort as a hardening agent in steel alloys, and the Metals Reserve Company offered loans and subsidies to increase production. The carnotite sands tailings from this mining activity over the years contained low concentrations of uranium oxides that were economically recoverable but uneconomical to ship.

The Manhattan District arranged for its suppliers, the Metals Reserve Company, Vanadium Corporation of America (VCA) and the United States Vanadium Corporation (USV), a subsidiary of Union Carbide, to mill tailings that contained 0.25% uranium oxide into concentrates or sludges containing anything from 10% to 50% oxide. VCA concentrated its ore at its mill in Naturita, Colorado, before shipment to Vitro's processing plant in Canonsburg, Pennsylvania. USV processed tailings at its mill in Uravan, Colorado, for delivery to Linde's plant in Tonawanda. The Manhattan District also contracted with USV to construct and run government-owned mills at Durango, Uravan and Grand Junction in Colorado, which would process tailings.

By 1 January 1947, approximately 344,432 tonnes (379,671 short tons) of ore tailings had been purchased, yielding about 1,224 tonnes (1,349 short tons) of black oxide. Of this, 808 tonnes (891 short tons) came from USV, 210 tonnes (230 short tons) from VCA, 122 tonnes (135 short tons) from the Metals Reserve Company, 24 tonnes (26 short tons) from the Vitro Manufacturing Company and 61 tonnes (67 short tons) from other sources. The total cost of procurement from American sources was approximately US$2,072,330 (equivalent to $29,880,466 in 2025).

To conserve uranium, the War Production Board prohibited the sale or purchase of uranium compounds for use in ceramics on 26 January 1943. In August, the use of uranium in the photography industry was restricted to essential military and industrial applications. The Madison Square Area bought up all available stocks. This amounted to 240 tonnes (270 short tons) of black oxide recoverable from uranium salts, at a cost of US$1,056,130 (equivalent to $15,228,104 in 2025).

=== Europe ===
The Alsos Mission was the Manhattan Project's scientific intelligence mission that operated in Europe. It was commanded by Lieutenant Colonel Boris Pash, with Samuel Goudsmit as his scientific deputy. It moved with the advance of the Allied armies (and sometimes ahead of them). In September 1944, after the liberation of Antwerp, the mission secured the corporate headquarters of Union Minière and seized its records. They discovered that over 1,100 short tons (1,000 t) tons of refined uranium had been sent to Germany, but about 140 tonnes (150 short tons) remained at Olen. They then set out for Olen, where they located 62 tonnes (68 short tons), but found another 73 tonnes (80 short tons) were missing, having been shipped to France in 1940 ahead of the German invasion of Belgium. Groves had the recovered uranium shipped to England and ultimately to the United States.

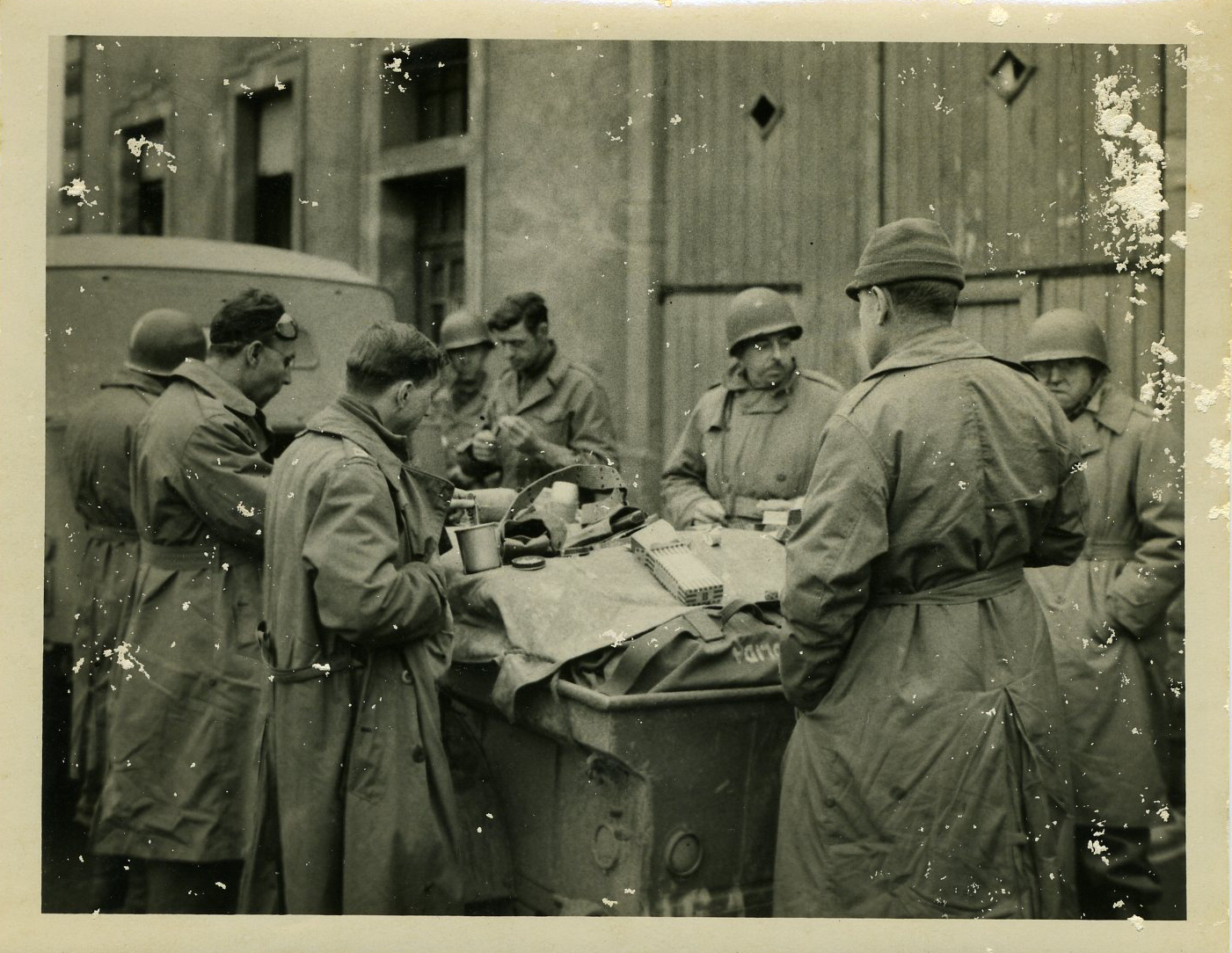
Personnel of the Alsos Mission in Germany. Boris Pash is in the center, wearing a helmet.

The Alsos Mission now attempted to recover the shipment that had been sent to France. Documentation was discovered that said that part of it had been sent to Toulouse. An Alsos Mission team under Pash's command reached Toulouse on 1 October and inspected a French Army arsenal. They used a Geiger counter to find barrels containing 28 tonnes (31 short tons) of the uranium from Belgium. The barrels were collected and transported to Marseille, where they were loaded on a ship bound for the United States. During the loading process one barrel fell into the water and had to be retrieved by a Navy diver. The remaining 44 tonnes (49 short tons) were never found.

As the Allied armies advanced into Germany in April 1945, Alsos Mission teams searched Stadtilm, where they found documentation concerning the German nuclear program, components of a nuclear reactor, and 7.3 tonnes (8 short tons) of uranium oxide. They learned that the uranium ores that had been taken from Belgium in 1944 had been shipped to the Wirtschaftliche Forschungsgesellschaft (WiFO) plant in Staßfurt.

This was captured by American troops on 15 April, but it was in the occupation zone allocated to the Soviet Union at the Yalta Conference, so the Alsos Mission, led by Pash, and accompanied by Michael Perrin and Charles Hambro, arrived on 17 April to remove anything of interest. Over the following ten days, 260 truckloads of uranium ore, sodium uranate and ferrouranium weighing about 910 tonnes (1,000 short tons), were retrieved. The uranium was taken to Hildesheim, where most of it was flown to the United Kingdom by the Royal Air Force; the rest was sent to Antwerp by train and loaded onto a ship to England.

In Haigerloch, they uncovered a German experimental reactor, along with three drums of heavy water and 1.4 tonnes (1.5 short tons) of uranium metal ingots that were found buried in a field. In all, the Alsos Mission captured 436 tonnes (481 short tons) of black oxide in the form of various compounds in Europe.

In the final days of the European war, the German submarine U-234, which was en route to Japan to deliver sensitive technology, surrendered to the Americans. Among its captured cargo was 560 kilograms (1,230 lb) of (unenriched) uranium oxide, separated into ten containers made out of lead and lined with gold (probably to avoid a threat from its potential pyrophoricity), which Germany was sending to Japan at the latter's request (officially for use as a catalyst for manufacturing butanol, but possibly destined for the small Japanese nuclear research program). This was taken into custody by Manhattan Project representatives under conditions of great secrecy at Portsmouth Naval Shipyard, where the submarine was directed after its surrender. The uranium was transferred to Indian Head Naval Station, and from there to an unknown location. The exact disposition of the uranium captured from the U-234 after June 1945 has never been fully documented, but Major John Lansdale, the former head of Manhattan Project security, said in 1995 that the uranium was then directly sent to Clinton Engineer Works, where it was added to the feed supply that was enriched as part of the weapons program.

Manhattan Project sourcing of uranium ore to 1 January 1947
| Country | Primary site | Mining company | Ore content (% U_{3}O_{8}) | U_{3}O_{8} (tons) | U contained (tons) | Cost (1947 dollars) | Cost ($/kgU) |
|---|---|---|---|---|---|---|---|
| Belgian Congo | Shinkolobwe, Haut-Katanga | Union Minière du Haut-Katanga | 65 | 6,983 | 5,922 | 19,381,600 | 3.27 |
| Canada | Eldorado Mine, Port Radium, Northwest Territories | Eldorado Gold Mines | 1 | 1,137 | 964 | 5,082,300 | 5.27 |
| United States | Colorado Plateau | Metals Reserve Company, United States Vanadium Corporation, Vanadium Corporation of America, Vitro Manufacturing Company | 0.25 | 1,349 | 1,144 | 2,072,300 | 1.81 |
| Captured by Alsos Mission | | | | 481 | 408 | | |
| Market purchase | | | | 270 | 229 | 1,056,130 | 4.61 |
| Total | | | | 10,220 | 8,667 | 27,592,330 | 3.18 |

== Uranium refining and processing ==
Uranium-bearing ores had to be refined and processed into the required feed materials for the Manhattan Project's production processes.

=== Black oxide ===
Eldorado's Port Hope refinery was located on the shores of Lake Ontario in buildings originally built in 1847 as part of a grain terminal. When production started in January 1933, there were just 25 employees; this rose to 287 in 1943. To cope with the increased demands of the Manhattan Project, a new building was added, and production was converted from a batch to a continuous process. Its commercial process was designed to process black oxide. Before the war, Port Hope had a capacity of 27 tonnes (30 short tons) per month. This was increased to 140 tonnes (150 short tons) per month.

Ore arrived from Port Radium after having already undergone some gravity and water separation that increased the percentage of black oxide to 35–50%. At Port Hope, the concentrate was crushed and a magnet used to remove iron. It was then heated to 593 °C (1,100 °F) to remove sulfides and carbonates by decomposition and arsenic and antimony by volatilization. It was then re-roasted with salt (NaCl) to form uranium chloride (UCl_{4}). This was treated with sulfuric acid (H_{2}SO_{4}) and sodium carbonate (NaCO_{3}) to form sodium uranyl carbonate (Na_{4}UO_{2}(CO_{3})_{3}), which was decomposed with sulfuric acid. Caustic soda (NaOH) was then added to create sodium diuranate (soda salt) (Na_{2}U_{2}O_{7}). Boiling removed excess hydrogen sulfide (H_{2}S), and ammonium hydroxide (NH_{4}OH) was added to form ammonium diuranate ((NH_{4})_{2}U_{2}O_{7}), to facilitate removal of the silver content. The ammonium diuranite was burned in crucible to produce black oxide, which was then crushed and bagged for shipment.

Purity was a major problem. The Manhattan District disliked impurities, particularly rare earth elements like gadolinium because they could be neutron poisons. But higher purity required repeated ammonium hydroxide baths, which were time consuming and expensive. Rather than aiming for 99% purity, it was better to settle for 97% and let Mallinckrodt deal with the problem in St. Louis. By 1 January 1947, Eldorado had produced approximately 1,662 tonnes (1,832 short tons) of black oxide from African ore at an average processing cost of approximately $0.69 per pound (equivalent to $10 in 2025). In addition to the African ores, Port Hope also produced 768 tonnes (847 short tons) of black oxide from Canadian ores. In May 1946, Mallinckrodt commenced construction of a new processing plant in St. Louis, which was completed in May 1946.

All Canadian ores were processed by Eldorado, but African ore concentrates were also processed at three other sites. At its plant in Canonsburg, Pennsylvania, the Vitro Manufacturing Company processed high-grade African ore. The plant had originally been built before the war by the Standard Chemical Company to process carnotite ores. The Manhattan District contracted the Linde Air Products Company to build and operate a plant for refining and processing African and American ores. The contract negotiated was a cost-plus-a-fixed-fee one, with the fee applying only to the operation phase. The plant at Tonawanda, New York, was completed in July 1943, and was operating at 110% of its designed capacity of 47 tonnes (52 short tons) of black oxide per month by December. At that point, the plant was switched over to processing low-grade African ore. In November 1944, at the request of the Madison Square Area, processes were modified to increase the efficiency of the extraction of ore from 93% to 95%, but this increased the cost from 80 to 85 cents per pound. Operations switched back to American ore concentrates in December 1944, but these were exhausted by February 1946, and the plant resumed processing African ore once more.

The industrial processes at the chemical processing and metal fabricating plants produced scrap material from which uranium oxide could be extracted. Much of this was from the fabrication of fuel rods for the X-10 (plutonium) project's reactors. To recover some of this, DuPont established a scrap recovery plant in Deepwater, New Jersey, adjacent to its brown oxide plant. Operations commenced in September 1943 and by 1 January 1947 some 891 tonnes (982 short tons) of black oxide was recovered. This represented more than 98% of the uranium content of the scrap material.

=== Brown and orange oxide ===
The next step in the refining process was the conversion of black oxide into orange oxide (UO_{3}) and then into brown oxide (UO_{2}). On 17 April 1942, Arthur Compton, the head of the Manhattan Project's Metallurgical Project, along with Frank Spedding and Norman Hilberry, met with Edward Mallinckrodt Sr., the chairman of the board of Mallinckrodt, and inquired whether his company could produce the extremely pure uranium compounds that the Manhattan Project required. It was known that uranyl nitrate (UO_{2}(NO_{3})_{2}), was soluble in ether ((CH_{3}CH_{2})_{2}O), and this could be used to remove impurities. This process had never been attempted on a commercial scale, but it had been demonstrated in the laboratory by Eugène-Melchior Péligot a century before. What had also been amply demonstrated in the laboratory was that ether was erratic, explosive and dangerous to work with. Mallinckrodt agreed to undertake the work. A pilot plant was set up in the alley between Mallinckrodt buildings 25 and K in downtown St. Louis. The pilot plant produced its first uranyl nitrate on 16 May, and samples were sent to the University of Chicago, Princeton University and the National Bureau of Standards for testing.

The production process involved adding black oxide to 3,800-litre (1,000 US gal) stainless steel tanks of hot concentrated nitric acid to produce a solution of uranyl nitrate. This was filtered through a stainless steel filter press and then concentrated in 1,100-litre (300 US gal) pots heated by steam coils to 120 °C (248 °F), the boiling point of uranyl nitrate. The molten uranyl nitrate was cooled to 80 °C (176 °F) and then pumped into ether that had been chilled to 0 °C (32 °F) in an ice water heat exchanger. The purified material was washed with distilled water and then boiled to remove the ether, producing orange oxide. This was then reduced to brown oxide by heating in a hydrogen atmosphere. The production plant was established in two empty buildings: the dissolving and filtering was conducted in Building 51 and the ether extraction and aqueous re-extraction in Building 52. The plant operated around the clock, and by July it was producing a ton of brown oxide each day, six days a week.

Uranium oxides
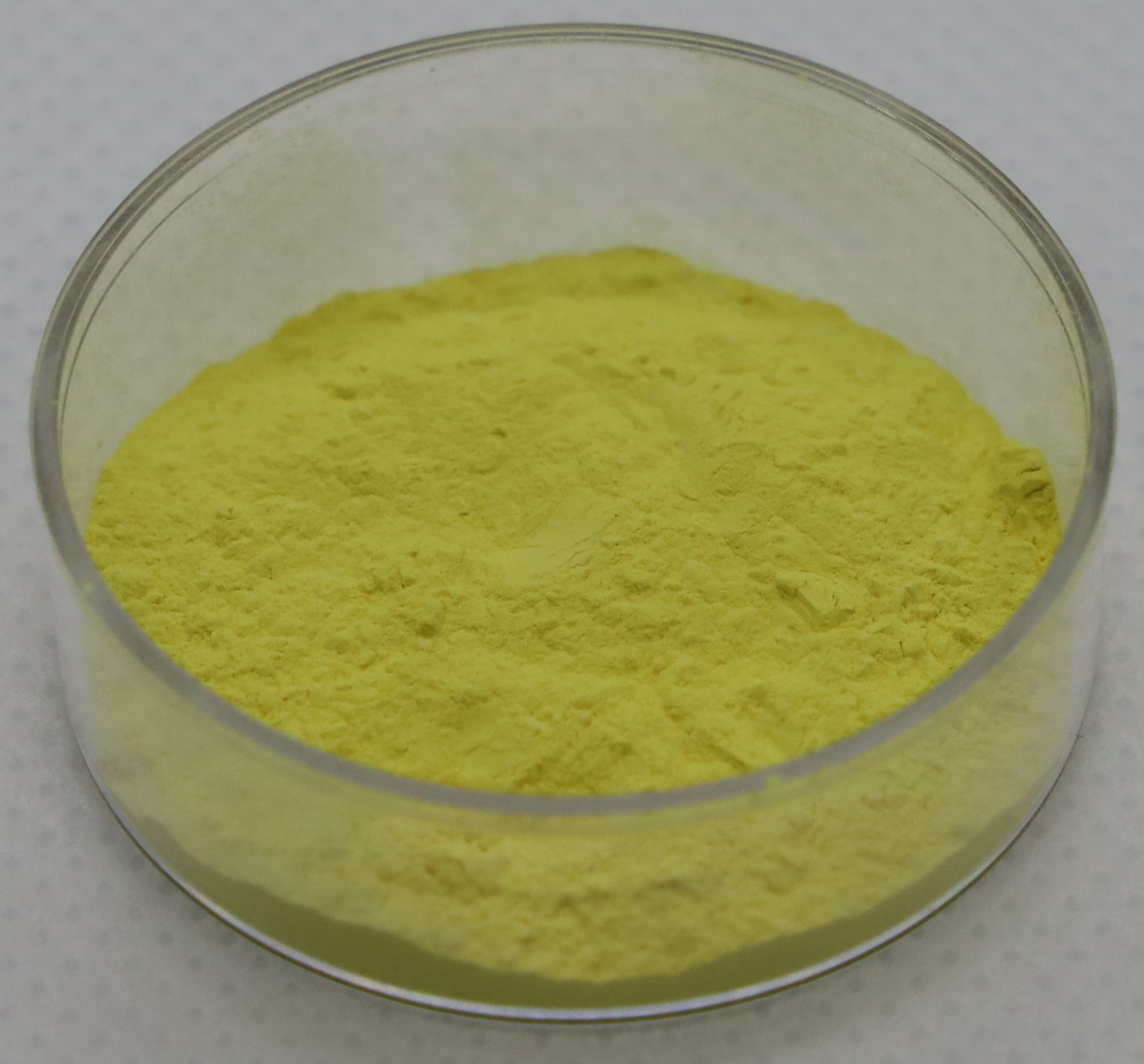
Uranyl peroxide (UO_{4})

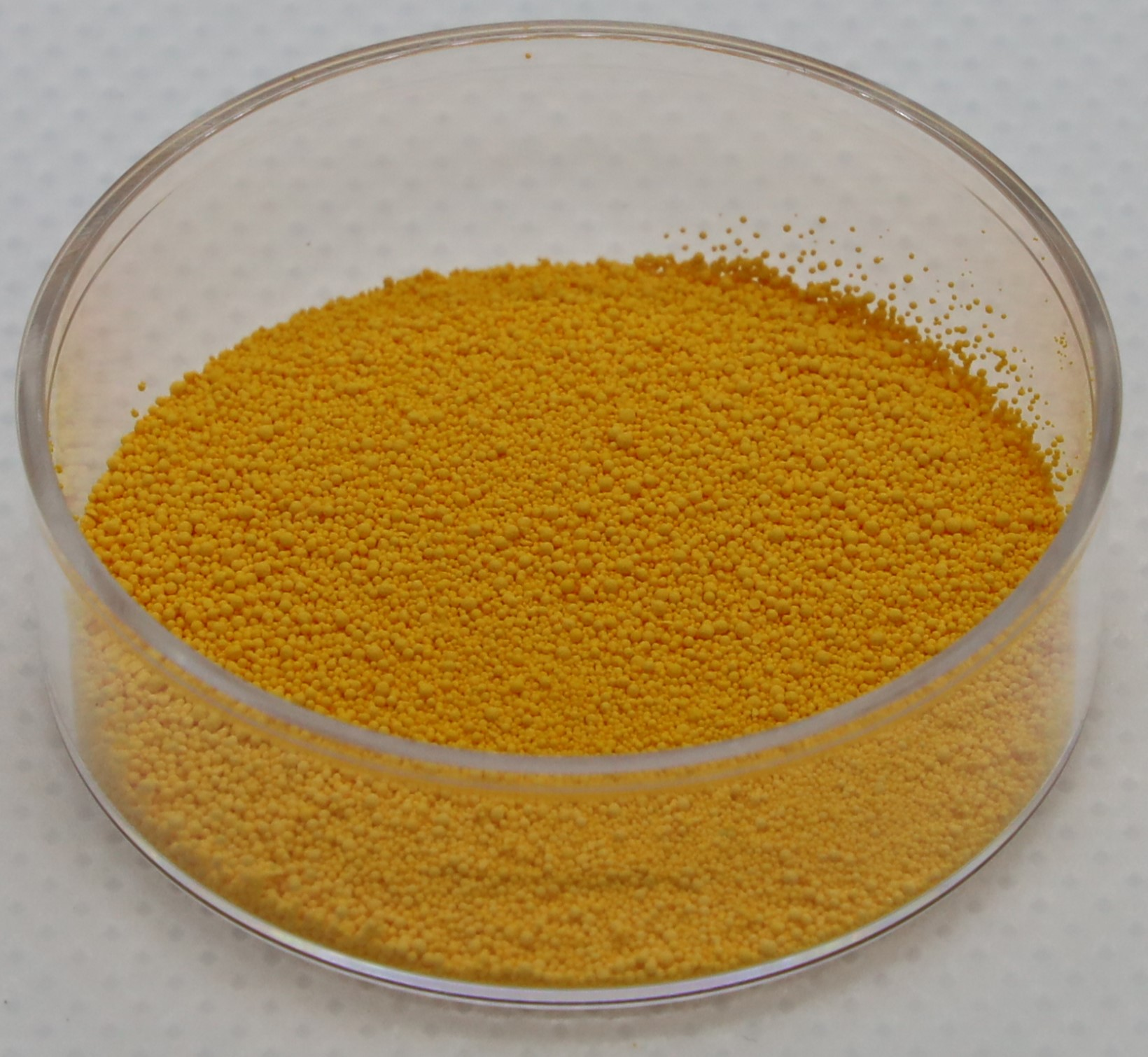
Orange oxide (UO_{3})

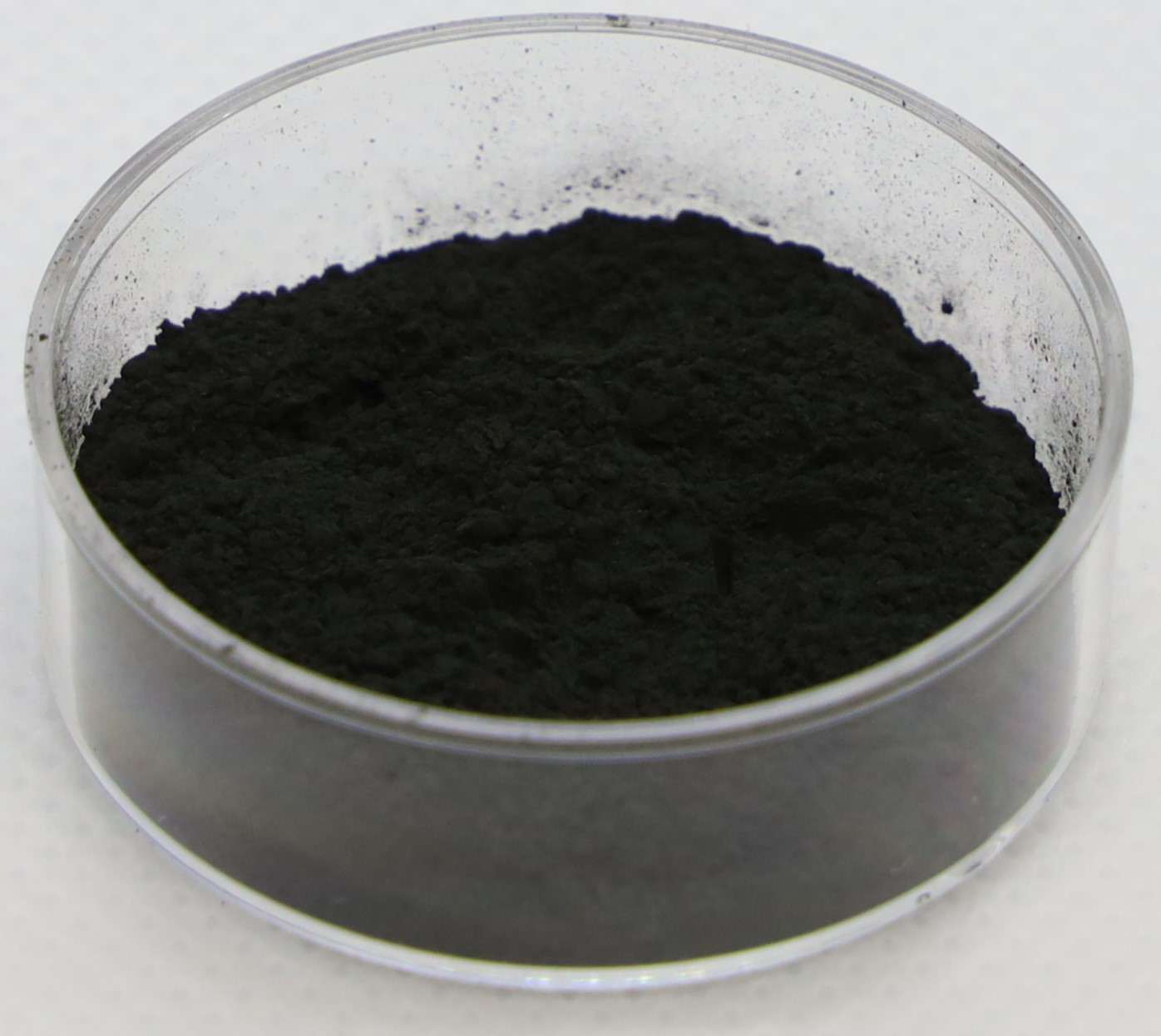
Brown oxide (UO_{2})

Compton later recalled that Nichols dropped by his office and told him: "we have finally signed the contract with Mallinckrodt for processing the first sixty tons of uranium. It was the most unusual situation that I have ever met. The last of the material was shipped from their plant the day before the terms were agreed upon and the contract signed." The purified brown salt was used in experimental sub-critical nuclear reactors built under the direction of Enrico Fermi, which demonstrated the feasibility of a reactor fueled with brown salt and moderated with graphite. On 2 December 1942, Chicago Pile-1, the first nuclear reactor, went critical, fueled entirely by brown salt from Mallinckrodt and uranium metal produced from Mallinckrodt brown salt.

As various improvements were incorporated into the process, the plant's capacity rose from its designed capacity of 47 tonnes (52 short tons) per month to 150 tonnes (165 short tons) per month. At the same time, the cost of brown oxide fell from $2.45 to $1.54 per kilogram ($1.11 to $0.70/lb) (equivalent to $47/kg to $30/kg in 2025), so Mallinckrodt refunded $332,000 (equivalent to $6,542,000 in 2025) to the government. The plant closed in May 1946. In May 1945, Mallinckrodt decided to build a new brown oxide plant. Construction commenced on 15 June 1945, and was completed on 15 June 1946.

Other brown oxide plants were operated by Linde in Tonawanda, and DuPont in Deepwater, New Jersey, using the process devised by Mallinckrodt, but only Mallinckrodt also shipped orange oxide. Production commenced at Deepwater in June 1943, and by 1 January 1947 it had produced 1,790 tonnes (1,970 short tons) of brown oxide. Much of the Deepwater feed was recovered scrap material. This was converted into a uranyl peroxide (UO_{4}) that could be fed into the brown oxide process as if it were black oxide. Production commenced at Tonawanda in August 1943 and it produced 270 tonnes (300 short tons) of brown oxide before being closed in early 1944. Mallinckrodt was already producing 100 tonnes (110 short tons) of brown oxide per month for the Manhattan Project's requirement for 150 tonnes (160 short tons) and Union Carbide wanted to use the facilities for nickel compounds production for the K-25 (gaseous diffusion) isotope separation project.

=== Green salt and uranium hexafluoride ===
Green salt (UF_{4}) was required for the process of producing uranium metal. Before the Manhattan District assumed responsibility over procurement, OSRD had made arrangements with DuPont and the Harshaw Chemical Company for the development of new processes to produce green salt and for the production of small quantities. The processes that had been used in the past were expensive and complicated, and unsuitable for large-scale production. The process they came up with involved heating the brown oxide to a high temperature in an atmosphere of hydrofluoric acid (HF). This process was adopted by all plants with only minor differences. DuPont constructed a pilot plant for the new process in July 1942. Once the production plants were operating satisfactorily, no further research and development was contemplated, so there was no further need for the pilot plant, and it was closed on 19 October 1943. DuPont constructed a full-scale plant, which became operational in February 1943. It ran until mid-1944, when production capacity outran the supply of brown oxide. Since the green salt the DuPont plant produced was more expensive than that produced by the other plants, it was closed.

Uranium compounds
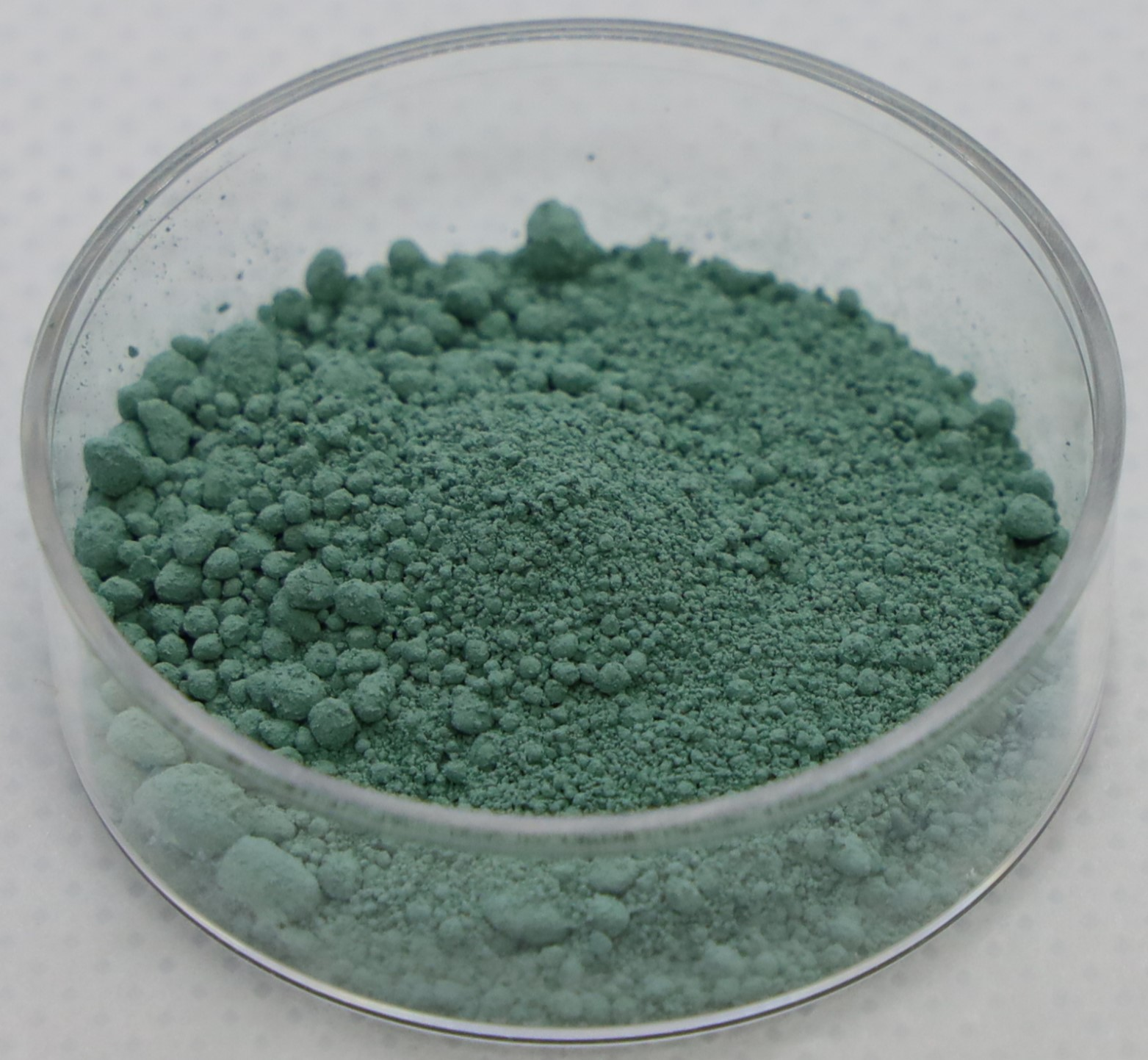
Uranium tetrafluoride (UF_{4})

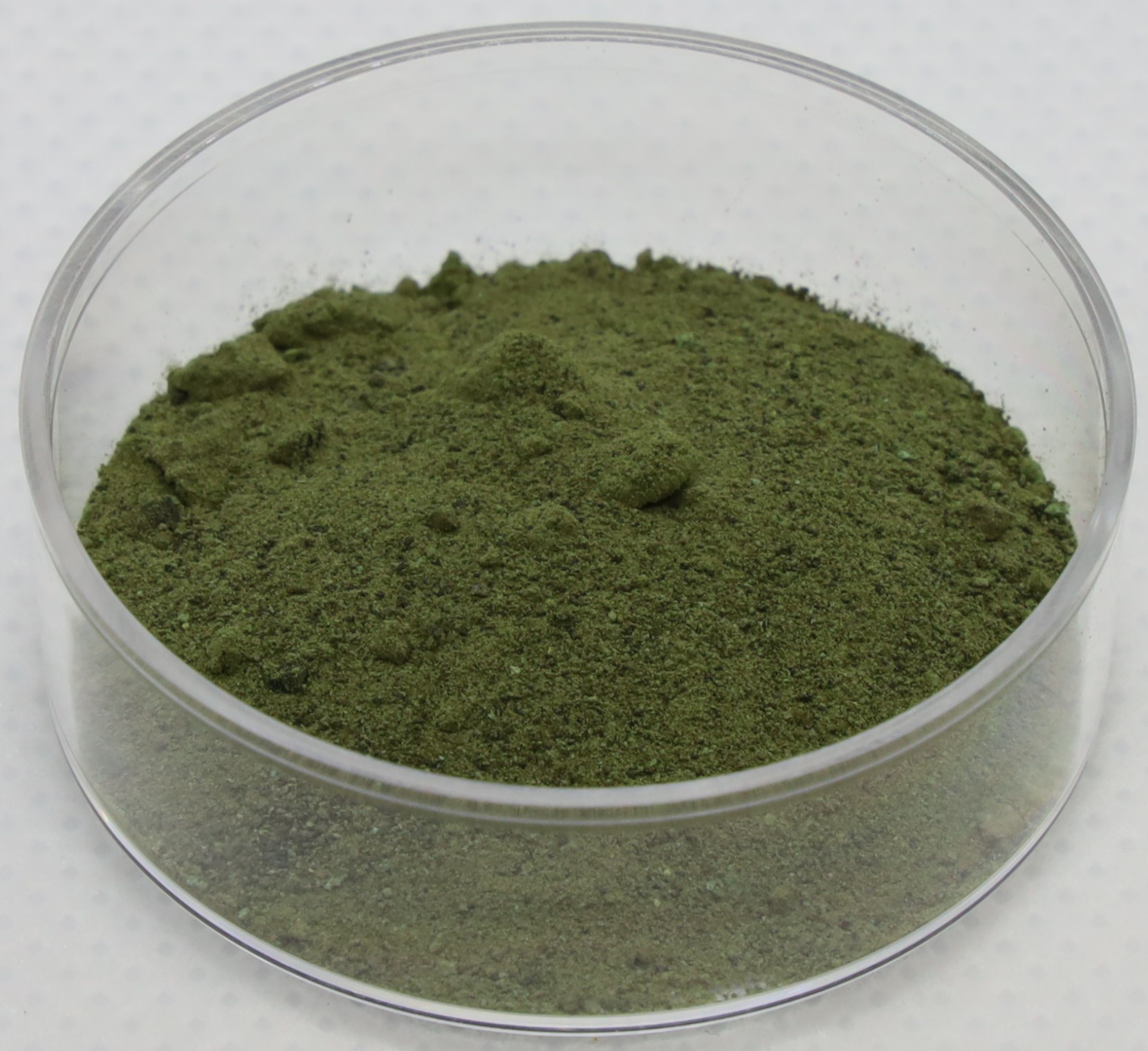
Uranium tetrachloride (UCl_{4})

Mallinckrodt established a green salt plant in a building adjacent to its property at St. Louis, rented from the Sash & Door Company. Here, the process used graphite boxes within steel retorts. Production commenced in April 1943, Linde built and operated a green salt plant under a cost-plus-fixed-fee contract. Production began in October 1943 and continued until 1 July 1946. Harshaw also operated a green salt plant in Cleveland, Ohio. It too, had a pilot plant, which was expanded in capacity in early 1943 to 25 short tons (23 t) per month. Its process initially used magnesium trays inside steel tubes lined with magnesium; this was later changed to nickel trays and steel tubes. By 1 January 1947, it had produced 1,640 short tons (1,490 t) of green salt. The final batch produced on 21 July 1944. At this point, the plant continued production, but all its output went into producing uranium hexafluoride (UF_{6}).

The S-50 (thermal) and K-25 (gaseous) isotope separation plants used this as feed, as it was the only known compound of uranium sufficiently volatile to be used in the gaseous diffusion process. Harshaw built and operated the large-scale plant for the production of hexafluoride after winning a competitive bid against DuPont. Hexafluoride was produced though the reaction of green salt with fluorine. Payment was on a unit price basis; the contract initially called for the plant to produce 79.4 metric tons (87.5 short tons) at a rate of 5.0 metric tons (5.5 short tons) per week during 1944. By 1 January 1945, 1,465 metric tons (1,615 short tons) had been delivered. Harshaw also produced 2.3 metric tons (2.5 short tons) of uranium oxyfluoride (UO2F2) for the Manhattan District through fluoridation of orange oxide. Although this substance was particularly difficult and unpleasant to handle, Harshaw charged $1.06 per kilogram ($0.48/lb), the same price as its green salt.

=== Uranium tetrachloride ===
Orange oxide from Mallinckrodt was shipped to the Clinton Engineer Works, where it was converted to uranium tetrachloride (UCl_{4}) used by the calutrons of the electromagnetic (Y-12) project. Initially, a process devised by Wendell Mitchell Latimer at the University of California, Berkeley was employed. This process involved first reducing orange oxide to brown oxide using hydrogen, and then reacting it with carbon tetrachloride (CCl_{4}) at 400 °C (752 °F) to produce uranium tetrachloride.

Charles A. Kraus from Brown University developed another method that was more suitable for large-scale production. It involved reacting the uranium oxide with carbon tetrachloride at high temperature and pressure to produce uranium pentachloride (UCl_{5}) and phosgene (COCl_{2}). Uranium tetrachloride is hygroscopic, so work with it had to be undertaken in gloveboxes that were kept dry with phosphorus pentoxide (P_{4}O_{10}), and phosgene was a lethal war gas, so the chemists had to wear gas masks when handling it. One fatality at Oak Ridge was attributable to exposure to phosgene.

On 18 October 1944 an urgent request was received from Y-12 for 36 metric tons (40 short tons) of uranium tetrachloride at the earliest possible date. Harshaw had produced uranium tetrachloride in the laboratory, so it was given the order. Large scale production commenced just three weeks later, on 7 November, and the order was completed on 1 January 1945. A supplementary order was then issued for another 29 metric tons (32 short tons). In February 1945, slightly enriched 1.4 percent uranium-235 feed material began arriving from the S-50 liquid thermal diffusion plant. Shipments of product from S-50 to Y-12 were discontinued in April, and S-50 product was fed into the K-25 gaseous diffusion process instead. In March 1945, Y-12 began receiving feed enriched to 5 percent from K-25. The output of the S-50 and K-25 plants was in the form of uranium hexafluoride (UF_{6}). This was reduced to orange oxide, which then underwent the usual process of conversion to uranium tetrachloride.

=== Uranium metal ===
Before the war, the only uranium metal available commercially was produced by the Westinghouse Electric and Manufacturing Company, using a photochemical process. Brown oxide was reacted with potassium fluoride in large vats on the roof of Westinghouse's plant in Bloomfield, New Jersey. This produced ingots the size of a quarter that were sold for around $20 per gram. Edward Creutz, the head of the Metallurgical Laboratory's group responsible for fabricating the uranium, wanted a metal sphere the size of an orange for his experiments. With Westinghouse's process, this would have cost $200,000 (equivalent to $3,940,937 in 2025) and taken a year to produce.

The hydride or "hydramet" process was developed by Peter P. Alexander, at Metal Hydrides, which used calcium hydride (CaH_{2}) as the reducing agent. By this means the Metal Hydrides plant in Beverly, Massachusetts, managed to produce a few pounds of uranium metal. Unfortunately, the calcium hydride used contained unacceptable amounts of boron, a neutron poison, making the metal unsuitable for use in a reactor. Some months would pass before Clement J. Rodden from the National Bureau of Standards and Union Carbide found a means to produce sufficiently pure calcium hydride. Metal Hydrides managed to produce 37 metric tons (41 short tons) of metal by the time operations were suspended on 31 August 1943. It then started reprocessing scrap uranium metal, and produced 990 metric tons (1,090 short tons) at a cost of $0.73 per kilogram ($0.33/lb).

Uranium refining at Ames
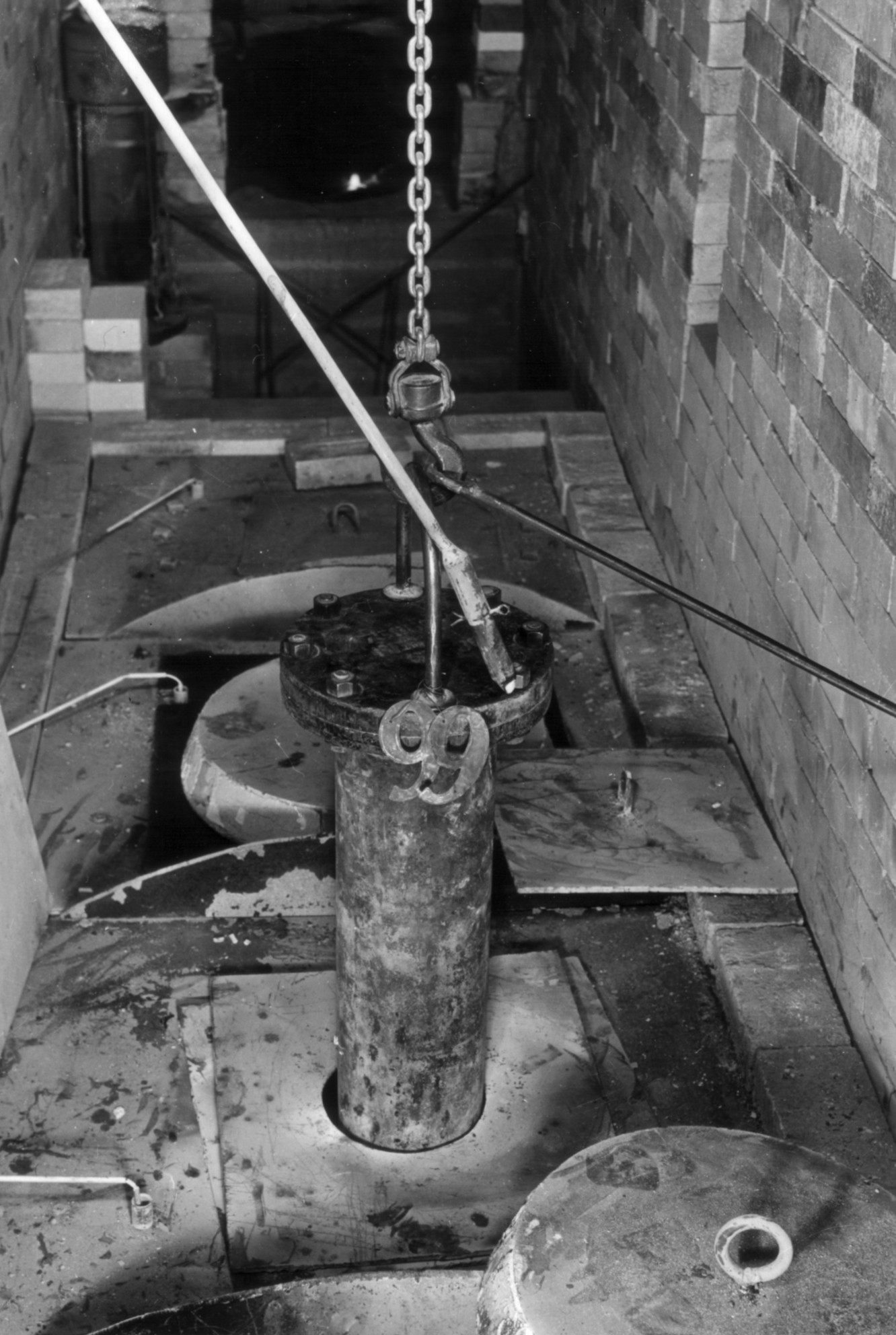
A "bomb" (pressure vessel) containing uranium halide and sacrificial metal being lowered into a furnace

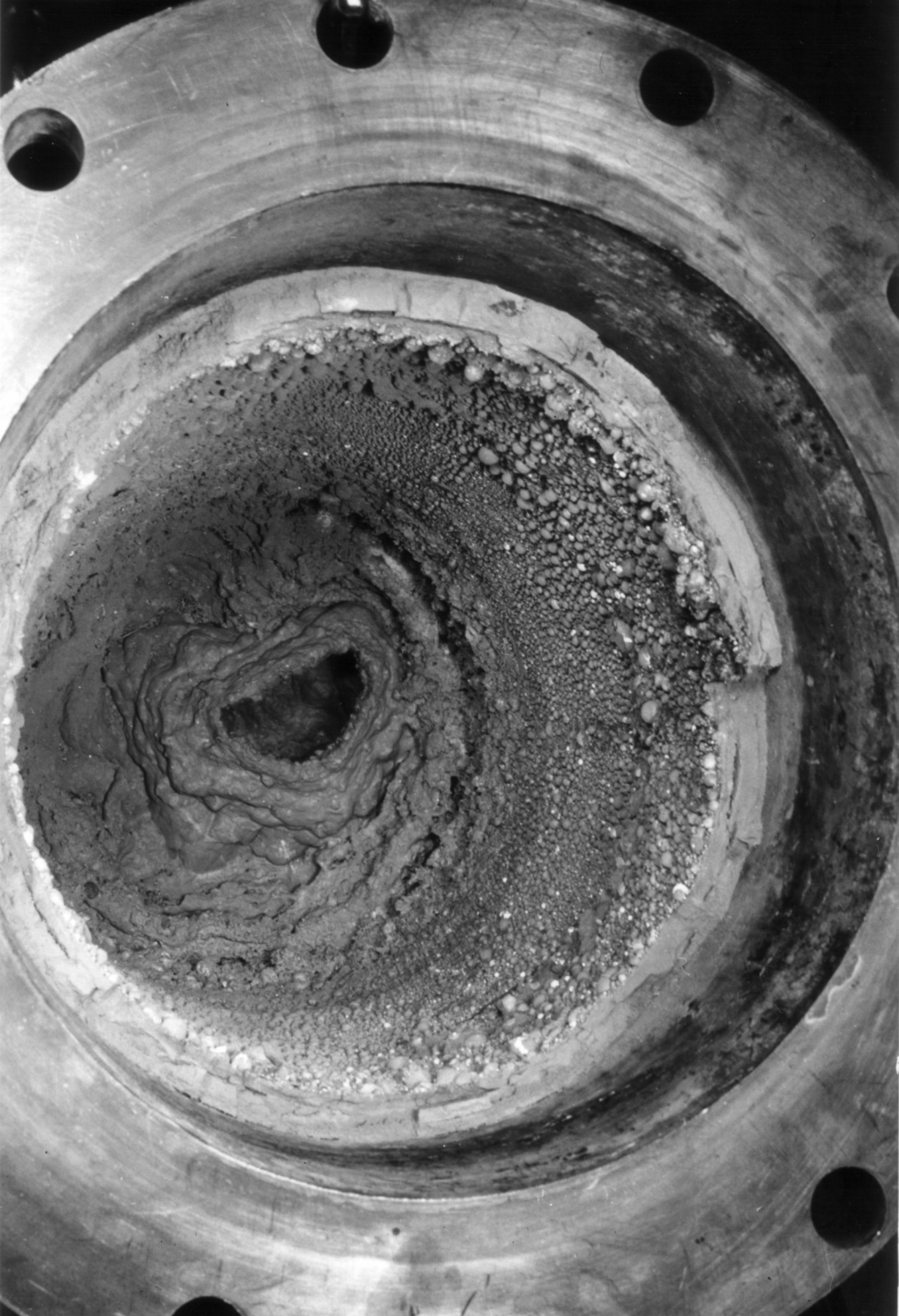
After the reaction, remnant slag coats the interior of a bomb.

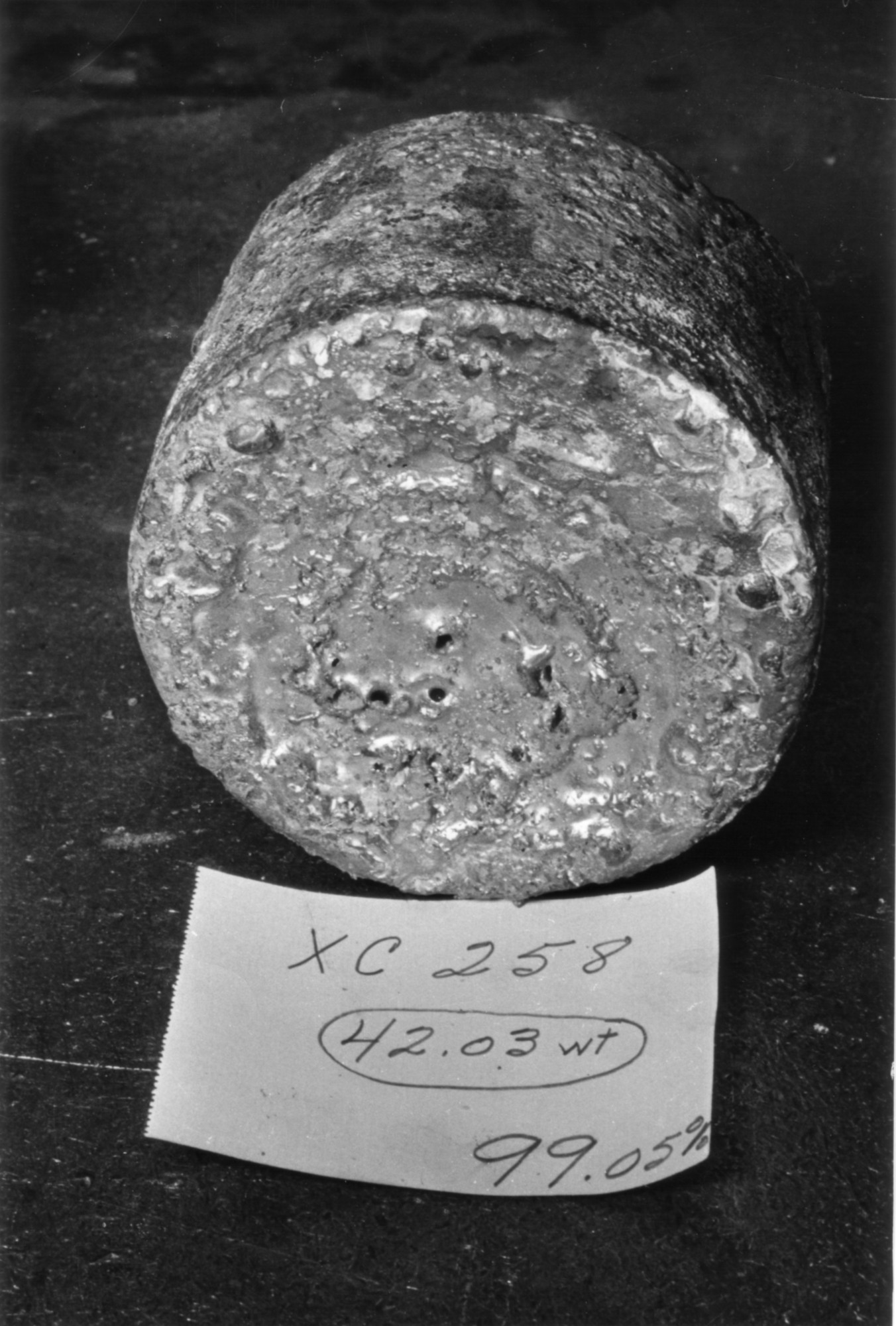
A uranium metal "biscuit" from the reduction reaction

At the Ames Project at Iowa State College, Frank Spedding wondered whether it would be possible to produce uranium metal from a salt, thereby bypassing the problems with oxygen. An associate, Wayne H. Keller, investigated what is now known as the Ames process, which was originally developed by J. C. Goggins and others at the University of New Hampshire in 1926. This involved mixing uranium tetrafluoride and calcium metal in a calcium oxide-lined steel pressure vessel (known as a "bomb") and heating it. Keller was able to reproduce Goggin's results on 3 August 1942, creating a 20-gram (0.71 oz) button of very pure uranium metal. The process was then scaled up. By September, bombs were being prepared in 10-centimeter (4 in) steel pipes 38 centimeters (15 in) long, lined with lime to prevent corrosion, and containing up to 3 kilograms (6.6 lb) of uranium tetrafluoride. C. F. Gray took these ingots and cast them into 10.98-pound (4,980 g), 12.7-by-5.1-centimeter (5 by 2 in) billets of pure uranium.

The pilot plant at Ames produced 882 metric tons (972 short tons) of metal at an average cost of $1.56 per pound until it ceased operation on 1 April 1945. Ames then created a pilot plant for reprocessing of uranium metal turnings, which produced 289 metric tons (319 short tons) of metal at an average cost of 80 cents per pound between 26 April 1944 and 31 December 1945.

Refined uranium compound production to 1 January 1947 (short tons)
| Contractor | Na_{2}U_{2}O_{7} | U_{3}O_{8} | UO_{2} | UO_{3} | UF_{4} | UF_{6} | Uranium metal | Total |
|---|---|---|---|---|---|---|---|---|
| Vitro | 768 | | | | | | | 768 |
| Eldorado | | 2,679 | | | | | | 2,679 |
| Linde | | 2,428 | | 300 | 2,060 | | | 4,788 |
| Mallinckrodt | | | 507 | 4,190 | 2,926 | | 1,364 | 8,987 |
| DuPont | | 982 | | 1,970 | 716 | | 232 | 3,900 |
| Harshaw | | | | | 1,640 | 1,615 | | 3,255 |
| Electro-Metallurgical | | | | | | | 1,538 | 1,538 |
| Iowa State | | | | | | | 972 | 972 |
| Metal Hydrides | | | | | | | 41 | 41 |
| Westinghouse | | | | | | | 69 | 69 |
| Total | 768 | 6,089 | 507 | 6,460 | 7,342 | 1,615 | 4,216 | 26,997 |

Mallinckrodt established a uranium metal plant on the second floor of the building containing the green salt plant using the Ames Process. Production commenced in July 1943 and 1,237 metric tons (1,364 short tons) of metal was produced by 1 January 1947. The unit price contracted for the first 82 metric tons (90 short tons) was $4.17 a pound, but Mallinckrodt found that it could produce for substantially less, and voluntarily refunded $2.20 a pound to the government. By 1 January 1947, the price had fallen to $0.71 per pound.

The Electro-Metallurgical Company in Niagara Falls, New York, (a division of Union Carbide) built an Ames Process uranium metal plant on its property under a cost-plus-fixed-fee contract. The plant operated from April 1943 to July 1946, and produced 1,395 metric tons (1,538 short tons) of metal at an average cost of $0.67 per pound. DuPont built one in Deepwater, but it encountered various difficulties in operation and only produced 210 metric tons (232 short tons) of metal at an average cost of $1.72 per pound before the Manhattan Project decided to close it down in August 1944. Westinghouse produced 63 metric tons (69 short tons) of metal in Bloomfield before the contract was terminated on 15 October 1943.

The Los Alamos Laboratory produced very pure highly enriched uranium metal from enriched feed using both a modified version of the Iowa bomb process and an electrolysis process. About 60 kg of highly enriched uranium provided the fissile component of the Little Boy atomic bomb used in the atomic bombing of Hiroshima in August 1945.

== Other minerals ==
=== Beryllium ===
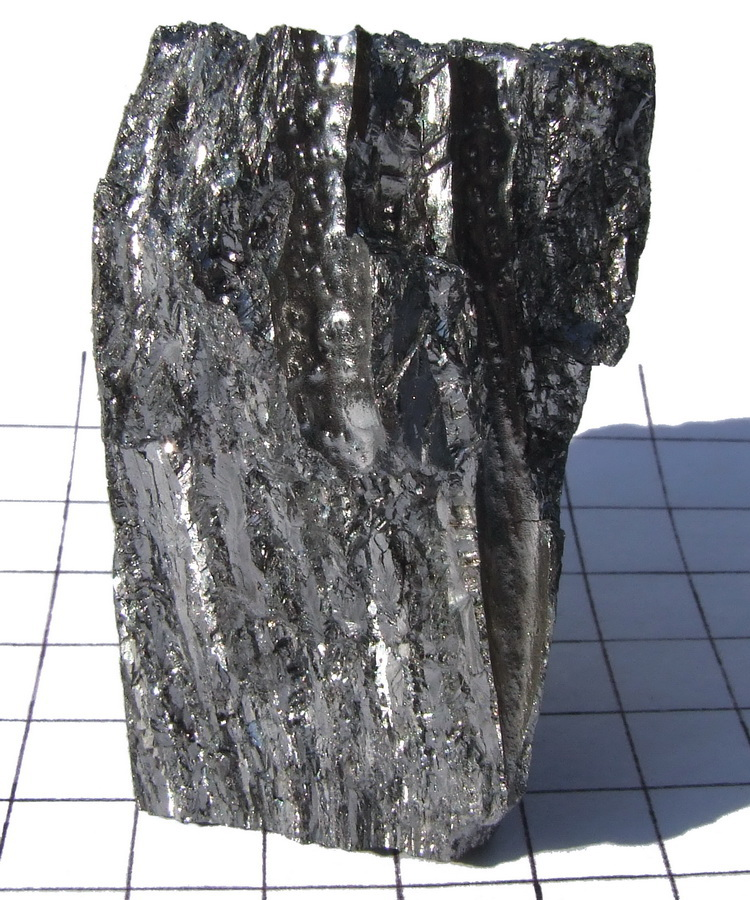
Beryllium

Beryllium was used by the Manhattan Project as a neutron reflector, and as a component of modulated neutron initiators. Only one firm produced it commercially in the United States, Brush Beryllium in Lorain, Ohio. The Ames Project began working on a production process in December 1943, reducing beryllium fluoride (BeF_{2}) in a bomb with metallic magnesium and a sulfur booster. The main difficulty with working with beryllium was its high toxicity. A closed bomb was used to minimize the possibility of producing toxic beryllium dust. The process worked, but the high temperatures and pressures created by the magnesium sulfide (MgS) meant that it was potentially explosive. An alternative was developed using beryllium fluoride in a bomb with metallic calcium and a lead chloride (PbCl_{2}) booster. The metal was then cast in a vacuum.

=== Boron ===
Due to its neutron-absorbing properties, boron-10 found multiple uses at the Los Alamos Laboratory, which raised a requirement for boron in both its natural form and enriched in the boron-10 isotope. This led to two lines of research at the Manhattan Project's SAM Laboratories at Columbia University in New York City: one aimed at developing a means of reducing boron compounds, and one at separating boron isotopes using an isotope fractionation process. Harshaw was awarded the contract to supply boron trifluoride (BF_{3}), at least 97% pure. A total of 41,930 kilograms (92,450 lb) was supplied by 1 March 1946 for $72,770 (equivalent to $1,201,450 in 2025).

Once the research into isotope separation had progressed sufficiently, a contract was awarded to the Standard Oil Company of Indiana, since fractionation was a common practice in the oil industry. While both boron trifluoride and dimethyl ether were gases at room temperature, their complex was a liquid. The American Cyanamid Company was awarded the contract for processing the boron trifluoride/dimeythl ether complex. The schedule called for the production of a kilogram of boron as soon as possible, five kilograms by 15 September 1944, and five kilograms per month thereafter. The plant in Stamford, Connecticut, was ready on 7 July 1944. Production ceased on 30 June 1946, by which time Cyanamid had delivered 229 kilograms (504 lb) of crystalline boron-10, 390 kilograms (850 lb) of calcium fluoride-boron trifluoride complex enriched in the boron-10 isotope, and 110 kilograms (242 lb) of calcium fluoride-boron trifluoride complex enriched in the boron-11 isotope.

=== Graphite ===
Graphite was chosen as a neutron moderator in the Manhattan Project's nuclear reactors, as heavy water, while a superior moderator, was not yet available in the necessary quantities and would take too much time to produce. At first, it appeared that procurement of graphite would not be a problem, as hundreds of tons were produced in the United States every year. The problem was purity. The graphite obtained by the Columbia University in 1941 had been manufactured by the US Graphite Company in Saginaw, Michigan. While it was of high purity for a commercial product, it contained 2 parts per million of boron, a neutron poison.

Scientists at the National Bureau of Standards found that the boron in commercial graphite came from the foundry coke used in its production, which contained 15 times as much boron as petroleum-based coke. By substituting petroleum coke and altering some of the production steps, the National Carbon Company in New York and the Speer Carbon Company in St. Marys, Pennsylvania, were able to make graphite that absorbed 20% fewer neutrons, which was sufficient to meet the Metallurgical Laboratory's stringent standards. The Manhattan Project used about 6,400 tonnes (7,000 short tons) of graphite.

=== Polonium ===
Polonium was chosen for use as a strong alpha particle emitter for the modulated neutron initiators developed for the first atomic bombs. Production was carried out by the Dayton Project in Dayton, Ohio. Polonium occurs naturally in various ores, and the lead dioxide residues from the refinery in Port Hope, left over after the removal of uranium and radium, were estimated to contain 0.2 to 0.3 milligrams (0.0031 to 0.0046 gr) of polonium per metric ton. (A curie of polonium weighs about 0.2 milligrams (0.0031 gr).) About 32 metric tons (35 short tons) of lead dioxide was treated with nitric acid, and about 40 curies (1.5 TBq) (8 mg) of polonium was produced. The lead dioxide was not purchased by the Manhattan Project, as it had been acquired by the Canadian government. In June 1945, the lead was precipitated as a lead carbonate slurry, and shipped to the Madison Square Area to be dried and returned to Canada.

Polonium could also be produced by neutron irradiation of bismuth in a nuclear reactor. Bismuth was purchased from the American Smelting and Refining Company of the highest purity it could produce. It was sent to the Hanford Engineer Works, where it was canned, and placed inside a reactor for 100 days. The irradiated slugs were shipped to Dayton, where they were bathed in hydrochloric acid to dissolve the aluminium canning. This formed an aluminium chloride solution that was disposed of, as it was highly radioactive due to the iron impurities in the aluminium. The bismuth slugs were then repeatedly dissolved in aqua regia to achieve a 1000–1 concentration, and the polonium was electroplated on platinum foils. The main problem with the process was that it required glass-lined containers due to the aqua regia, and mechanisms for safe handling of the radioactive material. By the end of 1946, Hanford was shipping material that contained up to 13,200 curies (490 TBq) (2.6 g) of polonium per metric ton of bismuth.

=== Thorium ===
Thorium was added to the Combined Development Trust's bailiwick because Glenn T. Seaborg had discovered that under neutron bombardment, thorium could be transmuted into uranium-233, a fissile isotope of uranium. This was another possible route to an atomic bomb, especially if it turned out that uranium-233 could be more easily separated from thorium than plutonium from uranium. It was not pursued further because uranium-233 production would have required a complete redesign of the Hanford reactors; but in April 1944 the Metallurgical Laboratory's Thorfin R. Rogness calculated that a nuclear reactor containing thorium could produce enough uranium-233 to sustain its reaction without adding anything but more thorium.

Thorium therefore offered an alternative to uranium which was (incorrectly) believed to be scarce. While control of the Congolese, Canadian and American sources gave the Combined Development Trust control of 90 percent of the world's known uranium reserves, a similar dominance over the world's thorium supply was impractical. Nonetheless, the Combined Development Trust set out to secure a large portion of it.

== Geological exploration ==
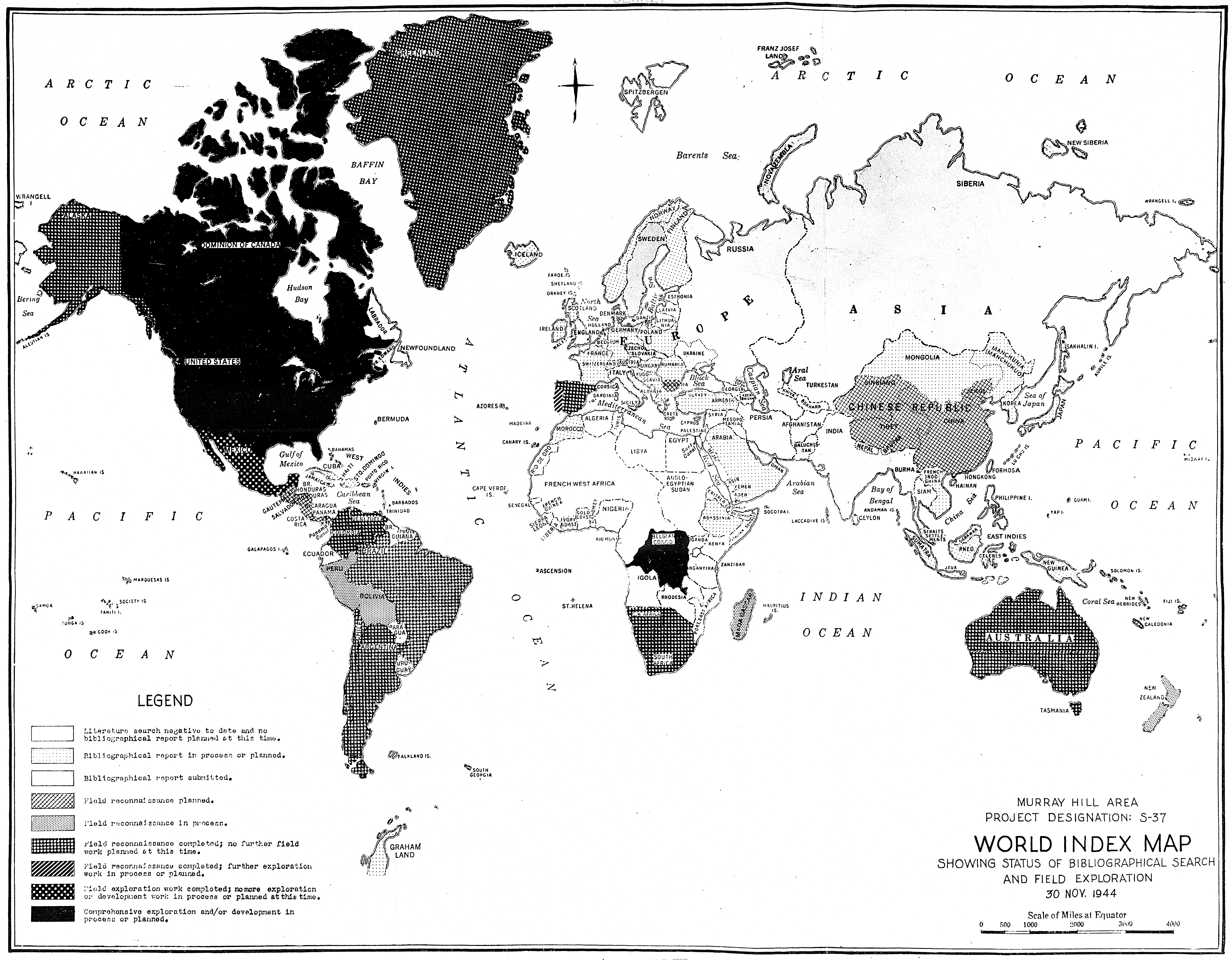
Map of the Murray Hill Area uranium and thorium survey status as of November 1944. Over the course of 1943–1947, Murray Hill Area staff conducted literature and field surveys of dozens of countries to assess their uranium and thorium resources.

Since the Manhattan Project was dependent on the availability of minerals, it was important to locate sources of them. The Murray Hill Area was established on 15 June 1943 to carry out the exploration for and development of mineral resources. It was commanded by Major Paul L. Guarin, a former geologist with the Shell Oil Company, until March 1946, when he was succeeded as area engineer by Lieutenant Colonel Arthur W. Oberbeck. A month later, the Murray Hill Area ceased to exist when it was absorbed by the Madison Square Area.

The Union Mines Development Corporation, a subsidiary of Union Carbide, was contracted to assist. In taking a census of the world's uranium and thorium reserves, the company consulted 67,000 books, half of them in foreign languages, and compiled 56 geological reports. Field explorations parties equipped with Geiger counters were sent to 20 countries and 36 of the United States, assisted by the United States Geological Survey and the Geological Survey of Canada. Some 45 reports were written on the Colorado Plateau region alone.

Samples collected were assayed by Union Carbide's laboratories in Niagara Falls, and later by Linde's in Tonawanda. Four properties were acquired in the Colorado Plateau at a cost of US$276,000 (equivalent to $3,980,000 in 2025). Some options in the Great Bear Lake region of Canada were also acquired, but on 15 September 1943 the Canadian government reserved all new discoveries of radioactive minerals in the Yukon and Northwest Territories and banned their staking by private interests, so these mineral rights were transferred to the Canadian government.

The conclusion was that the best source of uranium was the Belgian Congo, followed by Canada, the United States and Sweden. The survey rated Czechoslovakia, Portugal and South Africa as "fair", and Australia, Brazil, Madagascar and the United Kingdom as "poor". For thorium, the best sources were considered to be Brazil and India, with Indonesia, Malaysia, Thailand, Korea and the United States regarded as "fair".
