= Phillip L. Merritt =

American geologist (1906–1981)

- Born: Phillip Leonidas Merritt; February 8, 1906; Duluth, Minnesota, US
- Died: November 14, 1981 (aged 75); Salt Lake City, Utah, US
- Education: University of Minnesota; Columbia University
- Occupation: Geologist
- Spouse: Beatrice Wolff
- Relatives: Leonidas Merritt (grandfather)
- Scientific career
- Thesis: Seine-Coutchiching Problem (1934)
- Doctoral advisor: Charles Peter Berkey
- Military service
- Branch: United States Army Corps of Engineers
- Service years: 1942–1946
- Rank: Major
- Unit: Manhattan District
- Awards: Legion of Merit

Phillip Leonidas Merritt (February 8, 1906 – November 14, 1981) was an Amerixan geologist who located uranium reserves for the Manhattan District and the United States Atomic Energy Commission.

A graduate of the University of Minnesota, where he earned a degree in geology in 1928, and Columbia University, where he was awarded his PhD in 1942, Merritt joined the Manhattan District in 1942, and headed the Raw Materials Section of its Madison Square Area from 1943 to 1946. After the war he joined the United States Atomic Energy Commission, and directed its search for new sources of uranium. He became a consultant at the E.J. Longyear Company in 1954 and vice president of exploration at the Hidden Splendor Mining Company (later Atlas Minerals) in 1961. In 1966, he became a consultant to electric utilities.

== Early life ==
Phillip Leonidas Merritt was born on February 8, 1906, in Duluth, Minnesota, to Alva and Ruth Merritt. His father was the son of Lucien F. Merritt, one of the Seven Iron Men who founded the iron mining industry in the Mesabi Range. His mother was the daughter of Leonidas Merritt, another of the seven. He entered the University of Minnesota, from which he graduated with a degree in geology in 1928.

After graduation, he went to Africa, where he search for copper on behalf of the Rhodesian Selection Trust as part of a team of geologists headed by Minnesota geologist Anton Gray. He returned to the United States in 1929, and enrolled at Columbia University, where he wrote his PhD thesis on the "Seine-Coutchiching Problem" under the supervision of Charles Peter Berkey. He was awarded his master's degree in 1930, and a James Furman Kemp Fellowship in 1932. He was awarded his PhD in 1934.

Jobs for geologists were hard to come by during the Great Depression, but Merritt secured a position with the Columbian Department of Mines at an annual salary of US$200 (equivalent to $4,813 in 2025). He was engaged in mineral and oil explorations, and published several papers. He returned to the United States in 1936, and took a position with American Cyanamid in New York City as a geologist and mineralogist.

== World War II ==
In 1942, Merritt met Colonel James C. Marshall, the commander of the Manhattan District, which was in the process of developing the atomic bomb. Marshall was also the brother-in-law of Beatrice Wolff, whom Merritt would later marry. The Manhattan District had a pressing need for uranium and a geologist was needed to help locate sources. Merritt was commissioned as a captain in the United States Army Corps of Engineers in October 1942, and joined the Materials Section of Manhattan District's headquarters, which was located in New York City. In August 1943, the Manhattan District moved to Oak Ridge, Tennessee, but the materials section remained in New York, and was reorganised as the Madison Square Area. Merritt became the head of its Raw Materials Section, a position he held until the Manhattan Project wound up at the end of 1946.

Over the next five years, he traveled widely, usually in civilian clothes, to sites like the Eldorado Mine on the shore of Great Bear Lake in Canada, the Shinkolobwe mine in the Belgian Congo, and the vanadium mines of the Colorado Plateau. Sent to the Congo to find alternative sources of uranium ore aside from those of Shinkolobwe, he found none, but discovered that the tailings from Shinkolobwe contained up to 20% uranium ore, making them richer than any sources in the United States. For his service, Merritt was awarded the Legion of Merit in 1946. He married Beatrice Wolff on 2 November, and left the Army at the end of the year with the rank of major.

== Later life ==
On January 1, 1947, the United States Atomic Energy Commission succeeded the Manhattan Project. Merritt transferred to the new agency as a civilian, becoming the assistant director of the raw materials section. He continued the global search for uranium, developing new sources in the Blind River area in Canada and in South Africa. He initiated research at the Massachusetts Institute of Technology under Antoine Marc Gaudin into methods for recovering uranium from South African gold-bearing ores. In the 1950s, he directed and funded searches by the United States Geological Survey and the United States Bureau of Mines aimed at finding sources in the United States, which ultimately discovered uranium in Utah, New Mexico and Wyoming.

The AEC exploration office was transferred to Washington, DC, in 1954, but Merritt elected to stay in New York. He left the AEC to become a consultant at the E.J. Longyear Company. His work there involved the assessment of the company's ore reserves and determination of the economic value of mining them. In November 1956, he receive the University of Minnesota's Outstanding Achievement Award, given to graduates or former students who have "attained unusual distinction in their chosen fields or professions or in public service."

In 1961, he moved to Salt Lake City, Utah, where he became vice president of exploration at the Hidden Splendor Mining Company, which subsequently became Atlas Minerals. Atlas failed in its attempt to diversify from uranium mining, which remained its core business. When Atlas moved to Denver, Colorado, in 1966, he elected to stay in Salt Lake City. He became a consultant to electric companies that needed uranium for their nuclear reactors.

Merritt died in Salt lake City on November 14, 1981, after a two-year battle with cancer. His papers are in the American Heritage Center at the University of Wyoming.
