= Antoine Marc Gaudin =

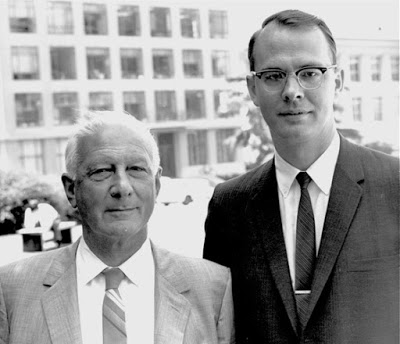
Gaudin (left) with Professor Douglas W Fuerstenau in Berkeley in June 1965, one year before his retirement from MIT

Antoine Marc Gaudin (August 8, 1900 – August 23, 1974) was a metallurgist who laid the foundation for understanding the scientific principles of the froth flotation process in the minerals industry. He was also a professor at the Massachusetts Institute of Technology, and during World War II developed there the ore-processing techniques needed to extract uranium from its low grade ores for the Manhattan Project. He was a founding member of the National Academy of Engineering.

== Early life ==
Gaudin was born in Smyrna, Ottoman Empire, where his French father was a railroad general manager and archaeologist, who relocated often. By his maturity Antoine could converse in Spanish, German, English, Greek, and French. The family returned to France where he was educated in Haifa, Versailles, and Toulon.

== Education ==
Gaudin attended universities in Paris and Aix-en-Provence from which he received his bachelor's degrees in 1916 and 1917, respectively. Toward the end of World War I, Gaudin and his father Paul moved to the United States, where Antoine attended Columbia University and served, briefly in 1918, in the U. S. military. Working under the respected Arthur F. Taggart, specialists in ore dressing, he was granted in 1921 an Engineer of Mines degree from the School of Mines at Columbia.

== Career ==
After brief interludes in industry and a short-term relocation to France after his father's death, Gaudin returned to Columbia in 1924 as a lecturer. In 1926 he became an American citizen. From 1926 to 1929 he taught at the University of Utah, and served as its head of research working with the U. S. Bureau of Mines in exploring flotation reagents. From 1929 to 1939, he was initially the "first research professor in ore dressing" at the Montana School of Mines, Butte, and continued his work in flotation research.

Gaudin and his colleagues at the University of Utah/U.S. Bureau of Mines, and later Montana Tech, systematically investigated the function of reagents on the flotation behavior of pure minerals. Gaudin is admired as the father of ‘Fundamental Flotation Research’ due to his focused research on flotation process. Earlier work had focused on the improvement of machinery and physical systems, while Gaudin focused on the chemical. During this time and because of his and other metallurgists work, the understanding of flotation processes evolved from one of mechanics and empirical research to that of the chemical phase, the understanding of the science underpinning the process, which aided in the greatly expanded utility of the process. His book Flotation (New York: McGraw-Hill, 1932, revised edition 1957) was the first definitive hand-book for the process. In 1941, the Montana School of Mines bestowed on him the honorary degree of Doctor of Science for his research on flotation. The book "Principles of Mineral Dressing" authored by Gaudin is still the basic book for all mineral processing engineers.

He then assumed a professorship at MIT in 1939. During World War II and subsequently, Gaudin led an MIT team extracting uranium from low-grade ore. In secret research for the Manhattan Project, his team discovered how to use leaching and ion exchange to extract uranium from low grade ores for use in the Manhattan Project feed materials program and the development of the atomic bomb.

He taught for over a quarter of a century at MIT, and earned the affection of his students who for twenty years hosted an annual breakfast for him at the annual meeting of the American Institute of Mining, Metallurgical and Petroleum Engineers (AIME). He retired from MIT in 1966. For his distinguished career in education, Gaudin was awarded several of the highest honors bestowed by the American Institute of Mining, Metallurgical, and Petroleum Engineers.

The American Institute of Mining, Metallurgical, and Petroleum Engineers published two volumes titled Flotation - A.M. Gaudin Memorial Volume in 1976, edited by MC Fuerstenau. In 1975 the Society for Mining, Metallurgy, and Exploration (SME) instituted the 'Antoine M. Gaudin Award' in honour of Gaudin. It is awarded for: "scientific or engineering contributions that further understanding of the technology of mineral processing". In 2016, in a list of the ten most famous metallurgists since Agricola, the SME selected Gaudin among its number.

== Personal life ==
In 1927, Gaudin married Anna Goodeth Brooks of Philadelphia, Pennsylvania. Former students and colleagues knew Anna, wife of Gaudin, as a charming and gracious woman. Gaudin was blessed with sons Paul and Robert, daughter Elinor, and twelve grand children. Gaudin was an avid fisherman, an outstanding chess player, on occasions a gourmet cook, an artist and a collector of paintings, as well as a patron of the Boston Symphony Orchestra and of the Boston Museum of Fine Arts. On August 23, 1974, Gaudin died in Boston, Massachusetts. He and his wife are interred in West Laurel Hill Cemetery, Bala Cynwyd, Pennsylvania.

== Awards ==
(1) Robert H. Richards Award (1957), American Institute of Mining, Metallurgical and Petroleum Engineers (AIME).

(2) Mineral Industry Education Award (1969), AIME.

(3) Honorary Member (1972), AIME.

(4) Henry Krumb Lecture (1967), AIME.

(5) Extractive Metallurgy Lecture (1961), AIME.

(6) Sir Julius Wernher Lecture (1952), Institute of Mining and Metallurgy, London.

(7) Doctor of Science Honoris Causa (1941), The Montana School of Mines.
