= Metals Reserve Company =

Former American independent agency

Agency overview
- Formed: 28 June 1940
- Dissolved: 1 July 1945
- Headquarters: Washington, DC, United States of America
- Parent agency: Reconstruction Finance Corporation

The Metals Reserve Company (MRC) was a wartime US government agency during World War II that procured, stockpiled and disposed of strategic and critical metals and minerals and paid subsidies to their producers. It was organized on 28 June 1940 as a subsidiary of the Reconstruction Finance Corporation (RFC) Act and was dissolved and merged with the RFC on 1 July 1945.

== History ==
The Metals Reserve Company (MRC) was organized on 28 June 1940 under the authority of section 5d of the Reconstruction Finance Corporation (RFC) Act. The RFC appointed the MRC's Board of Directors. The board and officials it appointed often served as directors or officers of the RFC or its subsidiaries.

The chief functions of the MRC were the procurement, stockpiling, and disposal of strategic and critical metals and minerals and the payment of subsidies to their producers, as, for example, under the wartime premium price plan. Under this plan, adopted in 1942, copper, lead and zinc mines were assigned basic metal quotas for which they received set ceiling prices. For above-quota production, the Metals Reserve Company paid premium prices that were a set percentage higher than the ceiling prices. This was to encourage greater production. All MRC programs were undertaken at the request or under the sponsorship of other Federal agencies. Policy for these programs was made by such agencies as the War Production Board, Office of Price Administration, the Board of Economic Warfare, and the military services. The MRC confined itself to an administrative and procedural role.

Procurement activities of the MRC included mining, refining, and processing operations. It was also involved with programs for the acquisition, recovery, and conversion of scrap and the distribution of aircraft parts and materials surplus to military and naval manufacturing contractors. In the course of these activities the MRC disbursed $2.75 billion (equivalent to $49 billion in 2025), acquiring about 50 kinds of metals and minerals from 51 countries, 39 states, and the Philippines. Proceeds from the sales of the materials purchased by the MRC amounted to $2.8 billion (equivalent to $50 billion in 2025). Another billion dollars was disbursed for freight, storage, handling, operating expenses, and for subsidy payments.

The largest single expenditure by the MRC was the payment of over $350 million (equivalent to $6,300 million in 2025) in direct subsidies to producers of strategic metals and minerals, chiefly copper, lead, and zinc, for the development of new sources and maximum production of such materials as were in short supply.

From 1940 the MRC was active in the Federal program to assure supplies of tin. It sponsored the construction of a smelter at Texas City, Texas, supervised its operations and undertook to procure tin ore. These activities were continued by the successors of the MRC until the smelter was sold to a private operator in 1957.

The MRC was dissolved and merged with the RFC on 1 July 1945, in accordance with an act of 30 June 1945. Its assets and liabilities were then liquidated by the Office of Metals Reserve that was established within the RFC. The MRC's unrecoverable costs as of 30 June 1947 were included in RFC notes payable to the Secretary of the Treasury that were cancelled by the direction of the Congress.
