= Biraco =

Biraco is the acronym of Bismuth, Radium, and Cobalt. It was the name of a now-defunct subsidiary company of Union Minière du Haut Katanga (UMHK) and Société Générale de Belgique created to refine these elements from the copper and uranium ores coming from the Katanga province in the Democratic Republic of Congo.

Radium was industrially produced in the beginning of the 20th century by Biraco in its Olen plant near Antwerp in Belgium.

The radium production plant was demolished during the years 1970 and the radium production wastes confined in a shallowly buried vault. The Olen site is still the object of remediation works financed by Umicore in the frame of its historical liability.

== See also ==
- Radium
- Bismuth
- Cobalt
- Société Générale de Belgique
- Union Minière du Haut Katanga
- Umicore
