= Middlesex Sampling Plant =

Coordinates: 40.5701°N 74.4914°W

- Superfund site
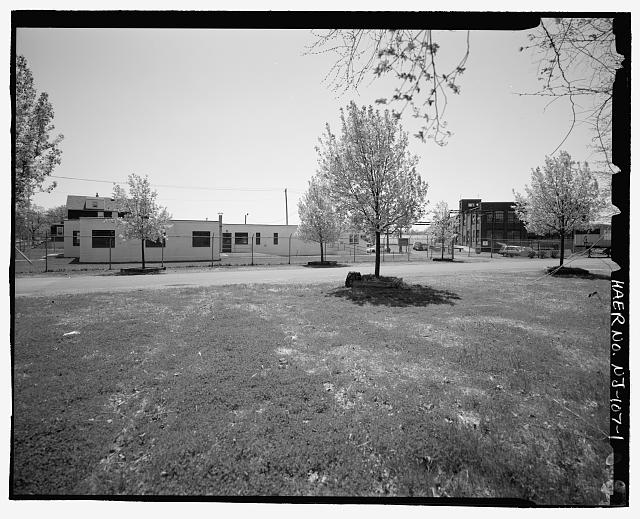
- Middlesex Sampling Plant, 1968

- Location within Middlesex County, New Jersey Location within New Jersey
- Location: Borough of Middlesex, Middlesex, New Jersey

Information
- CERCLIS ID: NJ0890090012
- Contaminants: Radioactive waste including uranium, thorium, and beryllium
- Responsible parties: US Department of Energy; United States military

Progress
- Proposed: September 29, 1998
- Listed: January 19, 1999

The Middlesex Sampling Plant on Mountain Avenue in Middlesex, New Jersey, is a 9.6 acres (38,800 m^{2}) site which was initially used to stockpile pitchblende uranium ore. From 1943 to 1955, under the direction of the Manhattan Project and its successor agency, the United States Atomic Energy Commission (AEC), it was used to crush, dry, screen, weigh, assay, store, package, and ship uranium ore, along with thorium and beryllium ores, for the development of the atomic bomb.

== Contamination ==
It was later discovered that radioactive waste had been disposed of a half mile away at the Middlesex Municipal Landfill. The site was used from 1955 to 1967 for the sampling and storage of thorium residues, and was decontaminated, certified, and released for unrestricted use in 1967. During the decontamination process, radioactive materials were carried away by wind and rain to the yards of nearby residents.

The facility was used by the United States Marine Corps as a reserve training center from 1969 until 1979, when the U.S. Department of Energy (DOE) took over and cleaned up the residential properties. Excavated soil was stored at the site in a specially constructed pile, known as the Vicinity Properties (VP) pile. The United States Army Corps of Engineers (USACE) disposed of 33,000 cubic yards (25,000 m^{3}) of contaminated soil from the Middlesex Municipal Landfill pile in 1998 and 35,000 cubic yards (27,000 m^{3}) from the VP pile in 1999.

As of 2007, the USACE continues to do ground water testing and has proposed a remedial action plan with the United States Environmental Protection Agency and the New Jersey Department of Environmental Protection. Closure of the site is pending, and long-term surveillance and maintenance requirements will be determined once final site conditions are known.

== Future use ==
In April 2024, the site was officially transferred to the Borough to build its public works facility and a warehouse with an adjoining road.
