= Canadian diamonds =

Sort of diamonds

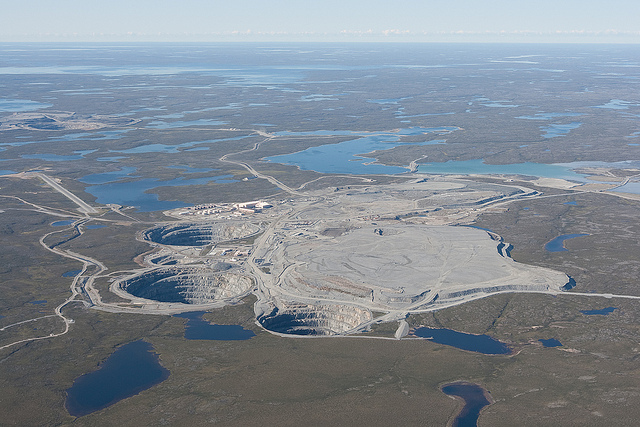
Aerial view of Ekati Diamond Mine, Canada's first diamond mine, located in the Northwest Territories (2010)

Canadian diamonds are diamonds which have been mined in any one of the provinces and territories of Canada. Diamond-rich areas were not commercially extracted in Canada until the early 1990s. For the first 60 years of the 20th century, diamonds originated from kimberlite pipes and alluvial deposits in places such as Africa and some from South America. Later, diamond discoveries were made in the Soviet Union (now Russia). Since the 1990s, major diamond discoveries have been made and mining operations have begun.

Canadian diamonds play a large role in the world market. In 2019, Canadian mines produced 18.6 million carats of diamonds, valued at $2.25 billion. As of 2019, Canada is currently the world's third largest producer of diamonds by both value and volume. Russia, Botswana, Canada, the Democratic Republic of the Congo, and Australia together produce over 80% of the world's diamonds.

== History of mining ==
The Northwest Territories (NWT) has had a long history with resource extraction, from the fur trade to the Klondike gold rush and mineral production. It was not until 1991 that diamonds were officially discovered by non-indigenous people, specifically, by two geologists named Chuck Fipke and Stewart Blusson. This discovery led to the first diamond mine in the NWT in 1998, a mine called Ekati that was initially operated by BHP Billiton. In 2003, Rio Tinto's Diavik Diamond Mine went into commercial production. Later, DeBeers opened the Snap Lake mine, which operated from 2008 to 2016. The three mines had a significant impact on both the regional economy and local Indigenous populace, with approximately 28% of the NWT's Indigenous community employed there.

During the 19th century, approximately 200 small diamonds had been found across the United States, mostly in Brown and Morgan counties in Indiana. In January 1906, George F. Kunz speculated that these diamonds were glacial erratics that had been transported from an unknown site in Canada.

Chuck Fipke and Stewart Blusson are credited with the discovery of the first diamond mines found in Canada in the mid-1990s. The first diamond-rich area they discovered was in Point Lake. Unfortunately, it was determined that this area was not economically viable for further development. However, its discovery resulted in one of the largest diamond-staking rushes in mining history. This massive search resulted in the discovery of the Ekati Diamond Mine, which is home to 156 kimberlite pipes. Fipke and Blusson still share a 20% ownership stake in the mine, and since beginning operations in 1998, Ekati has produced over 40 million carats of diamonds. The discovery and later success of this diamond mine caught the attention of other major mining operations, and more massive mines were opened and fully operational within 10 years.

== Current mines ==
=== Gahcho Kue Diamond Mine ===
The Gahcho Kue Diamond Mine Project is a Canadian diamond mine located near Kennady Lake, 280 km northeast of Yellowknife, on federal land. The mine is held by the Gahcho Kue Joint Venture (De Beers 51%, Mountain Province Diamonds Inc. 44.1% and Camphor Ventures 4.9%). Officially opened September 20, 2016, Gahcho is one of the richest diamond mines in Canada with a life expectancy of 12 years and a plan to produce over 50 million carats of diamonds. The mine consists of five kimberlites called Tuzo, Hearne, Tesla, Wilson and 5034. All five are only accessible by helicopter or plane. The Tuzo kimberlite is the deepest part of the mine, abundant in Tuffisitic Kimberlie Breccia. The Hearne kimberlite is the transitional part of the mine, which also dominates in Tuffisitic Kimberlie Breccia. The Wilson kimberlite is located roughly 200 meters east of the Tuzo kimberlite, while the Tesla kimberlite is about a kilometre northwest of the Tuzo kimberlite. The Wilson and Tesla kimberlites contain both tuffisitic and hypabyssal kimberlite. Lastly, the 5034 kimberlite is located directly under Kennady Lake, which was also the first kimberlite to be discovered at Gahcho and dominates in Hypabyssal Kimberlite. All five kimberlites have a life expectancy until 2028. A sixth kimberlite, called Curie, was thought to have been discovered in 2018; however, this is believed to be connected to the nearby Dunn Sheet, so is not thought to be a distinct discovery.

=== Diavik Mine ===
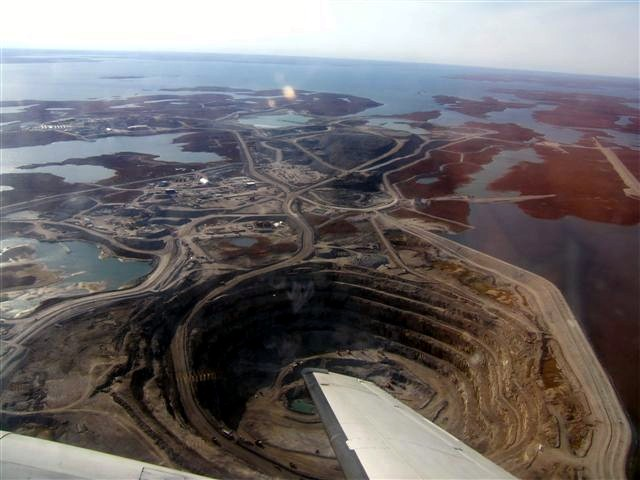
Diavik Diamond Mine, located in the Northwest Territories, Canada (2006).

The Diavik Diamond Mine is a diamond mine in Lac de Gras, Slave Craton, located about 300 km northeast of Yellowknife. Canada's second mine, first opened in January 2003, is one of the largest open pit diamond mines in the world (according to production) and currently produces around 8 million carats annually. The mine is currently in a transitional shift from open pit mining to underground mining. The mine is a joint venture with Aber Resources Ltd, owning 60%, and Kennecott Canada, owning 40%. Diavik Mine is only accessible by aircraft or temporary “ice roads” during the winter season. Diavik Diamond Mine has four kimberlites on site, called A154 South, A154 North, A418 and A21, where all four kimberlites are located beneath shallow waters. Both A154 South and A154 North are mined by open pit methods, which will develop into A418 and A21 kimberlites. Both A418 and A21 are mined underground. These kimberlites are projected to have a life expectancy until 2025.

=== Ekati Mine ===
The Ekati Diamond Mine is Canada's first underground diamond operation, located in Lac de Gras, around 300 km from Yellowknife. Exploration first started in 1981 but officially opened in October 1998. Since the opening in 2017, the mine has produced around 67.8 million carats of diamond and is still in production. The mine is owned by Dominion Diamond Mines, which first started with six kimberlites, called Beartooth, Fox, Koala, Koala North, Misery, and Panda. There are currently three underground kimberlites (Koala, Koala North, and Panda) and the rest are mined by surface mining. As of 2018, the current pipes which are mined are called Lynx, Pigeon, and Stable, all of which are open pit, and Koala remains the only current underground mining. Ekati plans to mine in various pipes until 2042, however there is ongoing exploration and projects associated with the closing date of the mine.

=== Renard Mine ===
Renard Diamond Mine is Quebec's first and only diamond mine fully owned by Stornoway, located approximately 250 km north of Chibougamau, Quebec. The mine was first opened in July 2014 and is expected to produce around 1.6 million carats of diamond each year, with a mining life of 14 years, ending in 2028. There are currently nine pipes operating at Renard Mine, with both open pit and underground mining. Renard Mine does not use chemicals in extraction processes, nor does it generate acid or metal leachates during processing, decreasing its impact during environmental assessment and the subsequent reclamation project once mining operations are over.

=== Snap Lake Mine ===
Snap Lake Diamond Mine was Canada's first underground diamond mine, located approximately 220 km northeast of Yellowknife, NWT. The mine was owned by De Beers and was their first mine outside of Africa. The mine was only assessable by helicopter, plane and “ice roads” during the winter seasons. The mine first opened in 2008 and produced 1.2 million carats of diamonds. In 2015, De Beers announced closure of the mine due to the decrease in diamond pricing and water issues at the mine.

=== Victor Mine ===
Victor Diamond Mine is an open pit diamond mine located in the James Bay Lowlands, approximately 90 km west of Attawapiskat First Nation, Ontario. Victor Mine is Ontario's first diamond mine, which opened in July 2008, owned by De Beers. The mine has produced 7 million carats until its closure, announced in The early 2019. Environmental monitoring is expected to take around five years with a reclamation plan after the environmental monitoring phase.

=== Jericho Mine ===
Jericho Diamond mine is located 420 km northeast of Yellowknife, Northwest Territories and was Nunavut’s first and only diamond mine. The kimberlite was first discovered in 1994 but was not operated until 2006. Operated by Tahera Diamond Corporation, Jericho produced 780,000 carats but closed in 2008 due to bankruptcy. The mine is currently dormant and has yet to be purchased for further production of diamonds.

=== Star-Orion Mine ===
Star-Orion South Diamond Project is located approximately 60 km east of Prince Albert, Saskatchewan. The project was approved under the Environmental Assessment Act and is fully owned by Star Diamond, starting bulk sampling in 2018. The mine plans to have road access all year, and estimates to produce 66 million carats of diamonds during the project, which plans to last 38 years.

== Environmental assessment ==
In Canada, there are currently two different systems which assess the impact of diamond mines. These systems are used as a framework to look at their sustainable development. The first approach is called the triple bottom line (TBL) approach. The TBL approach considers the environmental, economic, and societal impacts of diamond mining. This approach has the benefits of receiving legal attention, unlike the Five Capital (5 CAPS) approach. The 5 CAPS approach includes the natural financial and manufactured capital with humans’ skills and social capital. One of the benefits of using the 5 CAPS approach is that it can be used to compare it different countries sustainability.

== Environmental impacts ==
=== Wildlife impacts ===
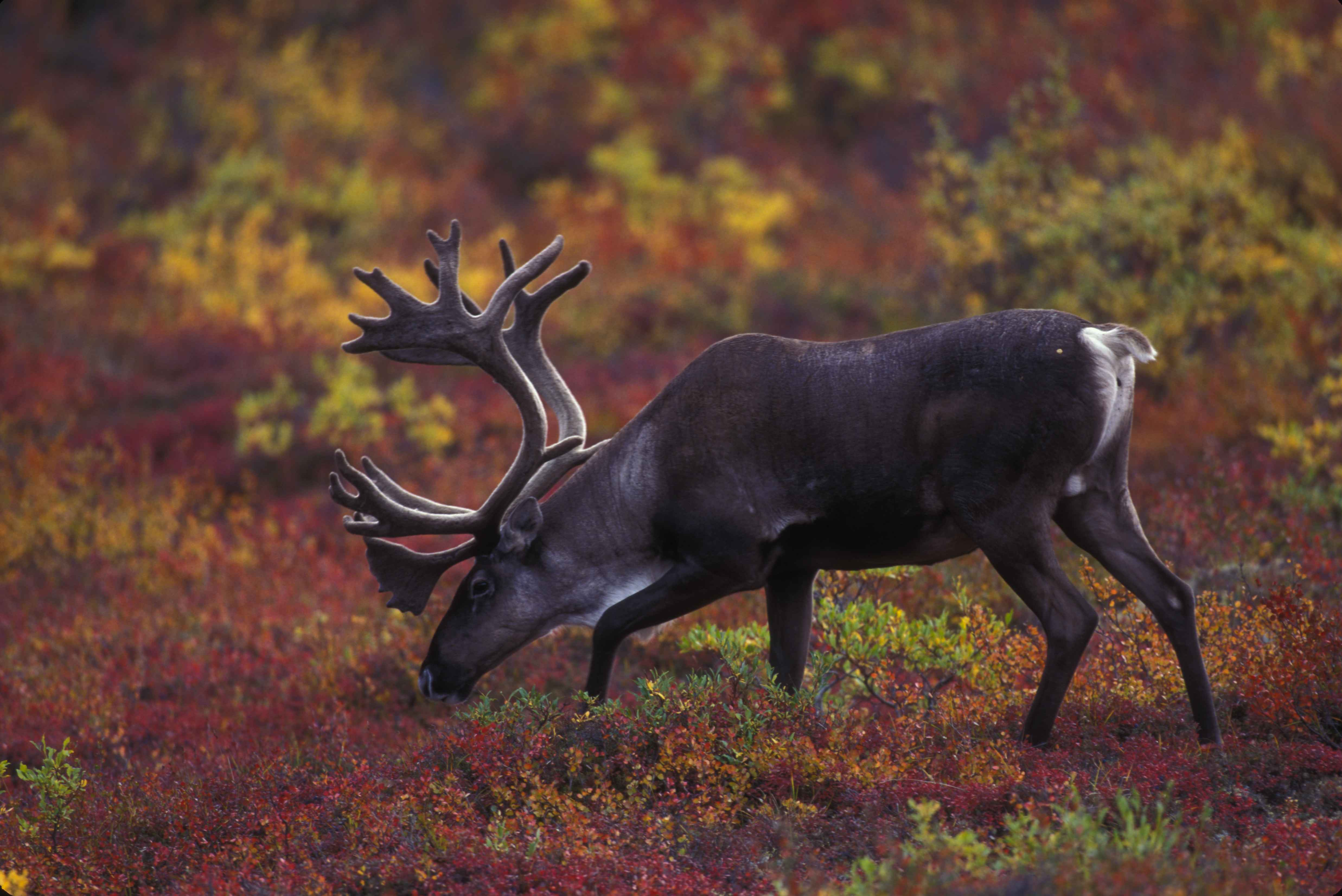
Barren ground caribou grazing in autumn.

There are major concerns and threats to local wildlife associated with diamond mining. One of the most important mammals in the NWT is the Barren-ground caribou, which are heavily impacted during the construction phases of mining. Caribous play a central role in local Indigenous culture and account for half of their meat intake. The process of clearing the land for extraction results in habitat fragmentation, disruption of wildlife corridors, contaminated drinking water, and collisions with vehicles. Due to the high death-rate of the caribous during mining practices, there is ongoing research into their protection. Management of the caribous includes groups such as co-management partners, Indigenous governments and organizations, renewable resource boards and communities.

Another important mammal in the NWT is the grizzly bear. These bears are currently low in population and their reproduction rate is declining. Attention to the status of grizzly bears started in 1995, when their behaviour, habits, and lifestyle were studied. Bear habitat loss due to mining infrastructure is low but a central cause of grizzly death is the attraction of food waste from mines. Practices in reducing food waste and scraps around the mine can potentially reduce the grizzly population decline.

=== Lake health ===
One of the biggest threats to lake health occurs once mining operations are over. Calcium (Ca) is a by-product of mining, which can modify lake chemistry when present in mining runoff, specifically its pH. Ekati Mine experienced a change in water chemistry where calcium concentrations increased from 1 mg/L to 30 mg/L. The increase in calcium results in an increase in pH from 7 to 8. Changes in pH can have negative impacts on ecosystem diversity.

Post-mining activities cause the runoff of many toxic chemicals into near streams and rivers. Harsh chemicals found in aquatic lake environments can impact aquatic producers (phytoplankton) and primary consumers (zooplankton). The health of species found at the bottom of the food chain determines the health and population of species found at the top of the food chain. The process of the decline of larger species from producers is called the bottom-up approach, where species at the bottom of the food chain determine the overall health of the lake. This cascading defect was seen at Ekati Diamond Mine, where lakes near the mine had a decrease in phytoplankton (producers) and zooplankton (primary consumers), where is caused the decrease of larger fish.

== See also ==
- List of diamonds
