= Dummett =

Dummett is a surname. Notable people with the surname include:

- Douglas Dummett (1806–1873), American politician and farmer
- Hugo Dummett (1940–2002), South African geologist
- Jimmy Dummett (1840–1900), Australian cricketer
- Michael Dummett (1925–2011), British philosopher
- Paul Dummett (born 1991), Welsh footballer
