= Joy Alukkas =

Indian businessman

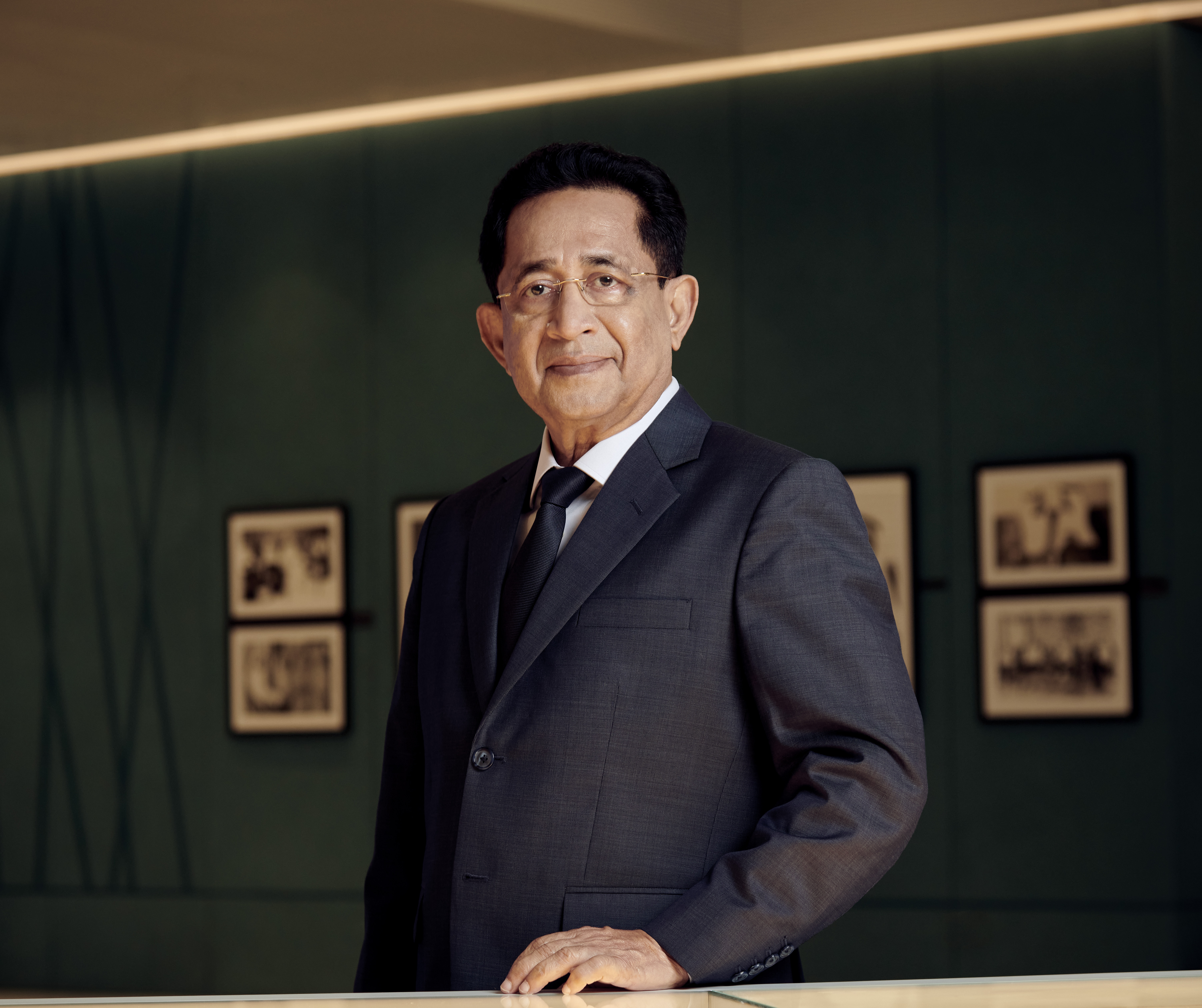
- Born: Alukkas Varghese Joy; 29 October 1956 (age 69); Thrissur, Travancore–Cochin State (now Kerala), India
- Title: Chairman of Joyalukkas Group
- Spouse: Jolly Joy
- Children: 3
- Website: www.joyalukkas.in

Joy Alukkas is an Indian businessman from Kerala. He is the chairman and managing director of Joyalukkas Group. According to a 2023 Forbes report, he has a net worth of $4.4 billion.

== Early life ==
His father, Varghese Alukkas "A. J. Varghese" of the Alukkas family started the jewellery business by setting a store in Thrissur, Kerala, India. Later Varghese shared his business among his sons - Jos, Francis, Joy Alukkas and Anto Alukkas.

Joy Alukkas is concentrated in overseas business and started trading in gulf countries. Joy Alukkas' original name according to Malayali naming conventions was A. V. Joy.

== Career ==
In 2001, Alukkas founded Joy Alukkas Jewellery. The group is based in Thrissur, Kerala and Dubai.

In 2012, Joyalukkas was authorized to sell Forevermark branded diamonds from De Beers.

== Philanthropy ==
In May 2018, Joy Alukkas contributed to relief fund for victims of the Cyclone Ockhi. After the Kerala Floods in September 2018, the Joyalukkas Foundation announced that it would build 250 houses for those who have lost their homes.

350 orphaned students were awarded the 'Joy of Hope' scholarship by Joyalukkas Foundation securing educational support for five years. Supported by a contribution from Alukkas. Plans for a Thrissur-based old age home and palliative care center were also announced.

== Controversies ==
In 2018, Income Tax Department Kochi carried out an IT raid on over 130 showrooms and premises related to the group, and found tax evasion and unaccounted sales of gold jewellery to the tune of ₹500 crore.

In February 2023, the Income Tax Department confiscated assets worth ₹305 crore of Joy Alukkas group as part of the raid on alleged black money transfers.

ED has successfully resolved the case of financial transfer via Hawala Channels from India to Dubai, Joy Alukkas, the Chairman of Joy Alukkas India Pvt Ltd, had assets valued at ₹305.84 crore attached by the Directorate of Enforcement in February 2023.

== Bibliography ==
- Joy Alukkas. Spreading Joy: How Joyalukkas Became the World's Favourite Jeweller. HarperCollins India (29 October 2023) ISBN 978-9356995260

== Awards and accolades ==
- Alukkas received ‘The Business Excellence Award 2016’ from Sheikh Nahyan Bin Mubarak Al Nahyan, UAE Minister of Culture, Youth and Social Development, organized by Indian Business Professionals Council (IBPC). (2016)
- Listed in Forbes Magazine in both their World's Billionaires list as well as their India's Rich list. (2018)
- Best Indian Diamond Jewellery of the Year by Retail Jeweller Middle East innovation Awards (2019)
- Listed as the 69th richest Indian in Forbes India's Richest List (2022)
- Joy Alukkas climbed to the position of richest jeweller in India with a rank of 50, his estimated net worth is $4.4 billion.
