= Talisman Crown =

Precious piece of jewellery

The Talisman Crown was created by De Beers Diamond Jewellers in celebration of Queen Elizabeth II's 60th Diamond Jubilee, which marked the 60th year of Elizabeth II's reign.

The Talisman Crown is decorated with both rough and polished diamonds, a juxtaposition De Beers previously used in their Talisman collection. "Rough diamonds were once worn exclusively by kings and queens, [and were believed] to bring power, protection and prosperity," says De Beers's C.E.O., François Delage. "We carefully explored a range of colors, shapes and quality of diamonds to create rich contrasts that bring together a story of time told through light."

== Description ==
The De Beers Talisman Crown has a total of 974 diamonds, including a 73 carat central rough diamond. "The uncut diamond wields a unique power and brings luck. Napoleon carried one in his pocket every time he went into battle," a De Beers employee explained at the crown's unveiling in the flagship store on Old Bond Street in London.

797 of the 974 diamonds are polished and 177 are rough. The crown took over 100 hours to complete according to De Beers.

== Viewing the Crown ==
The crown was originally displayed in Harrods of London in June 2012 and after some time in the De Beers Diamond Jewelers flagship store on Old Bond Street, the crown toured Beijing, Shanghai, Hong Kong, and New York City.
