= Hugo Dummett =

South African mineral-exploration geologist

Hugo T. Dummett (1940–2002) was a South African mineral-exploration geologist who is best known for his role in the discovery of the Ekati Diamond Mine in the Barren Lands of Canada's Northwest Territories. Dummett has been described as "the brains, the ideas and the energy" behind the discovery of Ekati, which led to the creation of a new Canadian diamond-mining industry.

== Career ==
Dummett earned his BSc degree at the University of the Witwatersrand in 1964, and moved to Canada in 1965 and attended Queen's university at Kingston, where he was a star rugby player playing fullback. In 1970, he entered the University of Queensland for graduate work. In 1977, Dummett signed on with Superior Oil to prospect for diamonds in North America, just as the science of using indicator minerals -- pyrope garnets, chrome diopside and chromite—for diamond exploration was being worked out. Superior formed a joint venture with Falconbridge Limited, and the joint venture hired geologist Charles Fipke for the diamond exploration project. Early in the program, Dummett tried to convince Governor Bill Clinton to lease Arkansas's Crater of Diamonds State Park. Between 1979 and 1982, the partners found at least 20 kimberlite pipes, but none had commercial diamond potential. The Falconbridge-Superior joint venture then funded a research program by South African geochemist John Gurney, to study possible indicator minerals for diamondiferous pipes. By 1982, Gurney had established that the kimberlite pyrope garnet "G10" was critical to diamond discovery. Pipes without the G10 garnet were likely to be barren. Using this new technology, the venture discovered a promising pipe in eastern Botswana, but lost the land to De Beers, who later discovered a commercial diamond deposit there.

Mobil Oil then bought Superior, and ended its mineral exploration program in 1987. Dummett convinced Mobil to turn over its data to Fipke so the exploration effort could continue. Fipke and his partner Stewart Blusson, working on a small budget, staked some promising ground near Lac de Gras in 1989. Dummett took a new job with BHP in 1989, and convinced his new employer to lease their property. In 1991, BHP drilling on their leased claims found micro-diamonds, sparking one of largest claimstaking rushes in mining history.

Under Dummet's direction, BHP eventually developed commercial diamond reserves in five pipes; the discovery pipe turned out to be non-commercial. BHP began the permitting process for the Ekati Diamond Mine in 1995, received final approval in 1997, and opened the mine late in 1998. By 2009, annual sales from EKATI amounted to about 5% by value of world diamond production.

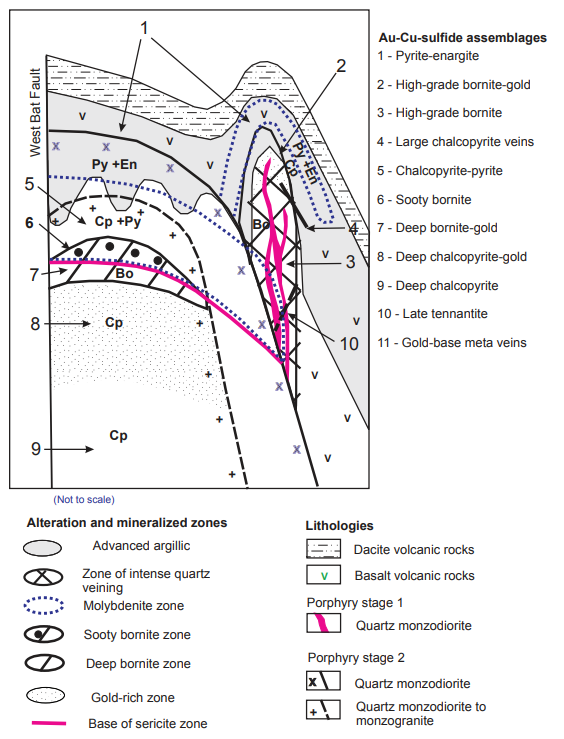
Hugo Dummett northern Oyu Tolgoi cross-section

In 2001, Dummett joined Ivanhoe Mines as Vice President. He contributed to the discovery of a large porphyry copper-gold deposit that was renamed in his honor, at the advanced Oyu Tolgoi project in Mongolia.

Dummett was killed in an automobile accident in South Africa in August 2002.

== Honors and awards ==
- Hugo Dummett won The Northern Miner's "Mining Man of the Year" award for 1998.
- In 2002 Dummett was President of the Society of Economic Geologists.
- The Far North Zone of the Oyu Tolgoi copper-gold deposit in South Gobi, Mongolia was renamed the Hugo Dummett Deposit in 2003 by his last employer, Ivanhoe Mines. The Oyu Tolgoi mining project is the largest financial undertaking in Mongolia's history, and is projected upon completion to account for more than 30% of the country's economy.
- The Hugo Dummett Diamond Award was established in his honor in 2004 by the Association for Mineral Exploration British Columbia.
- Dummett was inducted into the Canadian Mining Hall of Fame in 2010.
- Dummett has also received the William Lawrence Saunders Gold Medal (1997) and the Daniel C. Jackling Award (2000), among other awards and honors.
