= Diavik =

Diavik may refer to:

- Diavik Diamond Mine, in Canada's Northwest Territories
- Diavik Airport, that serves the Diavik Diamond Mine
