= François Delage =

French businessman

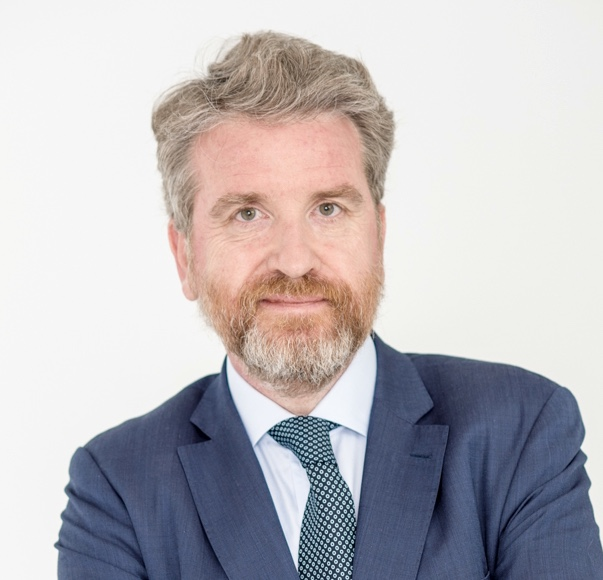
- Education: EBS European Business School
- Occupations: Entrepreneur, former Chief Executive Officer, De Beers Jewellers
- Website: www.delageprivateoffice.com

François Delage is a French businessman, entrepreneur, investor, adviser, and board member.

== Career ==
François Delage holds a business degree in Management and Finance from the European Business School. He began his career in finance at Louis Vuitton, then worked at Polychrome France and The Walt Disney Company before rejoining Louis Vuitton as finance director for Europe and the Middle East in 1995.

In 1999, Delage was appointed general manager for LVMH Fashion Brands (Celine, Fendi, Loewe, Louis Vuitton) in Micronesia (Guam and Saipan), based in Guam.

In 2001, he was appointed President for the Asia Pacific region for Louis Vuitton, based in Hong Kong. In February 2007, Delage was appointed CEO for Ralph Lauren Asia Pacific.

=== De Beers ===
Delage served as CEO of De Beers Jewellers from July 2009 to September 2020.

At De Beers, Delage led the brand strategy and turnaround, opened and spearheaded the expansion into China and Greater China, launched High Jewellery and most recently initiated and executed the transformation of the business to Omnichannel.

Under his leadership, De Beers Jewellers prioritised diversity and inclusion, both internally and externally, in all its marketing activities. The brand was also among the first luxury brands to celebrate women, their talents, and empowerment with the precursor programme "Moments in Light".

Delage had joined De Beers Jewellers from Forevermark, the diamond brand from De Beers Group, where he also held the position of CEO, and as such launched and developed the brand from late 2007. He then became an entrepreneur, founding Adorisa Group, a company that created, produced, marketed, and distributed fine jewellery for luxury fashion houses. In 2023, he became CEO of Barnes International.

Delage has since acted as an advisor to brands and private equity firms, serving on multiple boards and advisory boards, while also contributing his time on a voluntary basis to organizations aligned with his values.

== Personal life ==
Delage has lived and worked in London since September 2007, and prior to that in Hong Kong (2001-2007) and in Guam (1999-2000).
