= Archon X Prize =

Archon Genomics X PRIZE presented by Express Scripts
- Awarded for: "The US$ 10 million grand prize will be awarded to the team(s) able to sequence 100 human genomes within 30 days to an accuracy of 1 error per 1,000,000 bases, with 98% completeness, identification of insertions, deletions and rearrangements, and a complete haplotype, at an audited total cost of $1,000 per genome."
- Country: Worldwide
- Presented by: X PRIZE Foundation
- Reward: US$10 million
- Website: genomics.xprize.org

The Archon Genomics X PRIZE presented by Express Scripts for Genomics, the second X Prize offered by the X Prize Foundation, based in Playa Vista, California, was announced on October 4, 2006 stating that the prize of "$10 million will be awarded to the first team to rapidly, accurately and economically sequence 100 whole human genomes to an unprecedented level of accuracy." The 30 day evaluation phase of the competition to begin on September 5, 2013, was canceled August 22, 2013 and this cancellation was debated on March 27, 2014.

== Goals and history ==
In November 2011 the prize goals were stated as: "The $10 million grand prize will be awarded to the team(s) able to sequence 100 human genomes within 30 days to an accuracy of 1 error per 1,000,000 bases, with 98% completeness, identification of insertions, deletions and rearrangements, and a complete haplotype, at an audited total cost of $1,000 per genome."

The $10 million was donated by Canadian geologist and philanthropist Stewart Blusson, who co-discovered the Ekati Diamond Mine. The name "Archon" is the name of Blusson's company, which refers to the type of lithosphere beneath northern Canada. Upon cancellation, the money was returned to the Blussons because no Master Team Agreements were in place.

The Archon X Prize in genomics began as a joint effort of the X Prize Foundation and the J. Craig Venter Science Foundation. The J. Craig Venter Science Foundation offered the $500,000 (US) Innovation in Genomics Science and Technology Prize in September 2003 aimed at stimulating development of less expensive and faster sequencing technology. To attract even more resources to this goal, Dr. Venter joined forces with the X Prize Foundation, wrapping his competition and prize purse into a later incarnation, The Archon Genomics X Prize presented by Express Scripts.

== Test genomes ==
The 100 human genomes to be sequenced in this competition were donated by 100 centenarians (ages 100 or older) from all over the world, known as the 100 Over 100. Sequencing the genomes of the 100 Over 100 presented an unprecedented opportunity to identify those "rare genes" that protect against diseases, while giving researchers valuable clues to health and longevity. These centenarians’ genes would provide us with a window to the past, significantly impacting the future of healthcare. Although the contest is cancelled, the X PRIZE foundation collected blood samples and created cell-lines to preserve the DNA from more than 100 centenarians. Those genomes are expected to be sequenced nonetheless and put into an open data forum.

== Teams ==
The only two pre-registered teams were Ion Torrent in Guilford, CT and Wyss Institute for Biologically Inspired Engineering in Boston, MA. These teams were announced 23-Jul-2012 and 3-Oct-2012.

== Significance ==
The result was prematurely described as a "medical grade” genome and a critically needed clinical standard to transform genomic research into usable medical information to improve patient diagnosis and treatment. The global competition was expected to inspire breakthrough genome sequencing innovations and technologies to potentially aid development for a new era of personalized medicine.

The evaluation phase of the competition was officially set to begin on September 5, 2013, and conclude 30 days later on October 5, but was canceled August 22, 2013 because it was "outpaced by innovation". A public debate concerning the validity and potential implications of the cancellation was published March 27, 2014.

== See also ==
- List of genetics awards
- List of medicine awards
