= Gahcho Kué Diamond Mine =

Diamond mine in Canada

- Location within Northwest Territories Location within Canada
- Location: Northwest Territories, Canada; 63°26′04″N 109°11′10″W
- Products: Diamonds
- Opened: 2016

The Gahcho Kué Diamond Mine is located on the Canadian tundra in the Northwest Territories. It is situated at Kennady Lake (63°26′04″N 109°11′10″W), in the Akaitcho Treaty 8 Territory claim block, which is 85 km (53 mi) southeast of the Snap Lake Diamond Mine and approximately 280 km (170 mi) east northeast of Yellowknife. The site is served by Gahcho Kue Aerodrome, which has both an ice runway in winter and a year-round gravel runway, and a spur of the Tibbitt to Contwoyto Winter Road from Lupin Mine. the main camp is at 63°26′05″N 109°12′02″W, north of the ice strip, with a smaller site at 63°25′48″N 109°12′00″W, south of the runway.

== Background ==
The Gahcho Kué Diamond Mine is a joint venture between Mountain Province Diamonds (49%) and De Beers Canada (51%).

The mine, which opened officially on 20 September 2016, consists of the Gahcho Kué kimberlite pipes, which lie underneath Kennady Lake. There are also several unexplored kimberlite occurrences scattered over several kilometres.

== Project history ==
In 1993, Canamera Geological began sampling and surveying the area for Mountain Province Mining Joint Venture (now Mountain Province Diamonds). Exploration began in the area with a camp being set up in 1995. In 1997, Monopros, now De Beers Canada, took over the camp when they joined the Mountain Province Mining Joint Venture. In 1998 De Beers began sampling the kimberlite to evaluate the four Gahcho Kué pipes. More drilling followed and the positive results led to the decision to proceed.

A project study was started in 2004. An evaluation program in 2006 was followed by a drilling and sampling program in 2007. In September 2009 a feasibility study on a proposed mine was started, which was completed in September 2010. De Beers and its partners approved it in June 2011 and are preparing a plan and budget for a final decision on whether to go ahead with the mine project. If it proceeds to an operating mine, is expected to annually mine 3,000,000 tonnes (3,000,000 long tons; 3,300,000 short tons) of kimberlite, and to produce 4,500,000 carats (900 kg) per year over an 11-year life.

In 2005, the Mackenzie Valley Environmental Impact Review Board (MVEIRB), after an initial environmental assessment, ruled that De Beers applications for a land use permit and water license would require a full Environment Impact Review. De Beers appealed this decision to the NWT Supreme Court, but was denied in April 2007, and the review process began in 2007. Due to economic factors, De Beers delayed filing the required Environment Impact Statement (EIS) to the review board and the review process was suspended in May 2010. De Beers gave notice in November and filed the EIS on 23 December 2010, and after some subsequent revisions to address a few deficiencies, the MVEIRB accepted it on 26 July 2011.

Construction began in 2013 with Hatch as the EPCM engineering firm. The Mine began production in 2016. The site consists of open pits, a concentration and recovery plant that converts kimberlite ore to rough diamonds, and support facilities including a camp, airport, and other infrastructure. As of 2020, the 5034 and Hearne pits are in full production and initial sampling of the Tuzo pit has begun. In 2020, De Beers Group announced plans for the mine to become carbon neutral by 2030.

== Traditional use ==
Gahcho Kué is the traditional Chipewyan, a Dene people, name for the Kennady Lake area and in Dene Suline means "Place of the Big Rabbit". The area, also known for Barren-ground caribou, has been traditionally used by Dene from Łutselk'e and the Métis of Fort Resolution. In earlier times Tłı̨chǫ (Dogrib), also Dene, people used the area as well.

== See also ==
- Gahcho Kué kimberlite pipes
- List of diamond mines
