= Gahcho Kué kimberlite pipes =

The Gahcho Kué kimberlite pipes is a cluster of Cambrian kimberlite diatremes located 280 km (174 mi) northeast of Yellowknife, Northwest Territories, Canada. It consists of five pipes: 5034, Hearne, Wilson, Tuzo and Tesla.

== See also ==
- Volcanism of Northern Canada
- List of volcanoes in Canada
- Gahcho Kue Diamond Mine Project
