= Diavik Diamond Mine =

Diamond mine in Northwest Territories, Canada

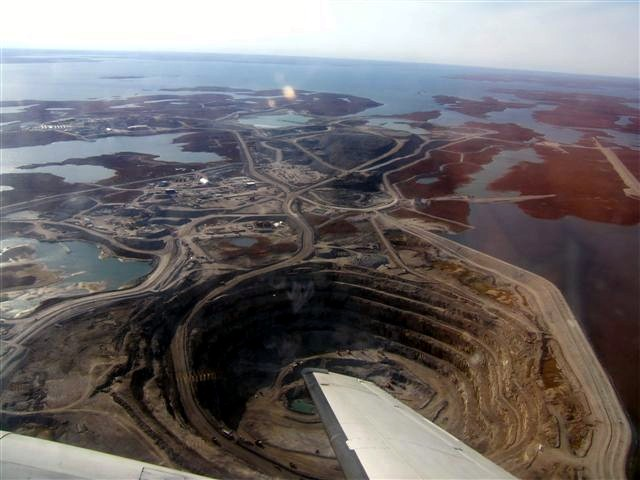
- Diavik mine in 2006

- Location in Canada Diavik Mine (Canada)
- Location: Lac de Gras, Northwest Territories, Canada; 64°29′46″N 110°16′24″W
- Products: Diamonds
- Discovered: 1992
- Opened: 2003
- Closed: 2026
- Company: Rio Tinto, operated by Rio Tinto company Diavik Diamond Mines Inc.
- Website: https://www.riotinto.com/en/Operations/canada/diavik

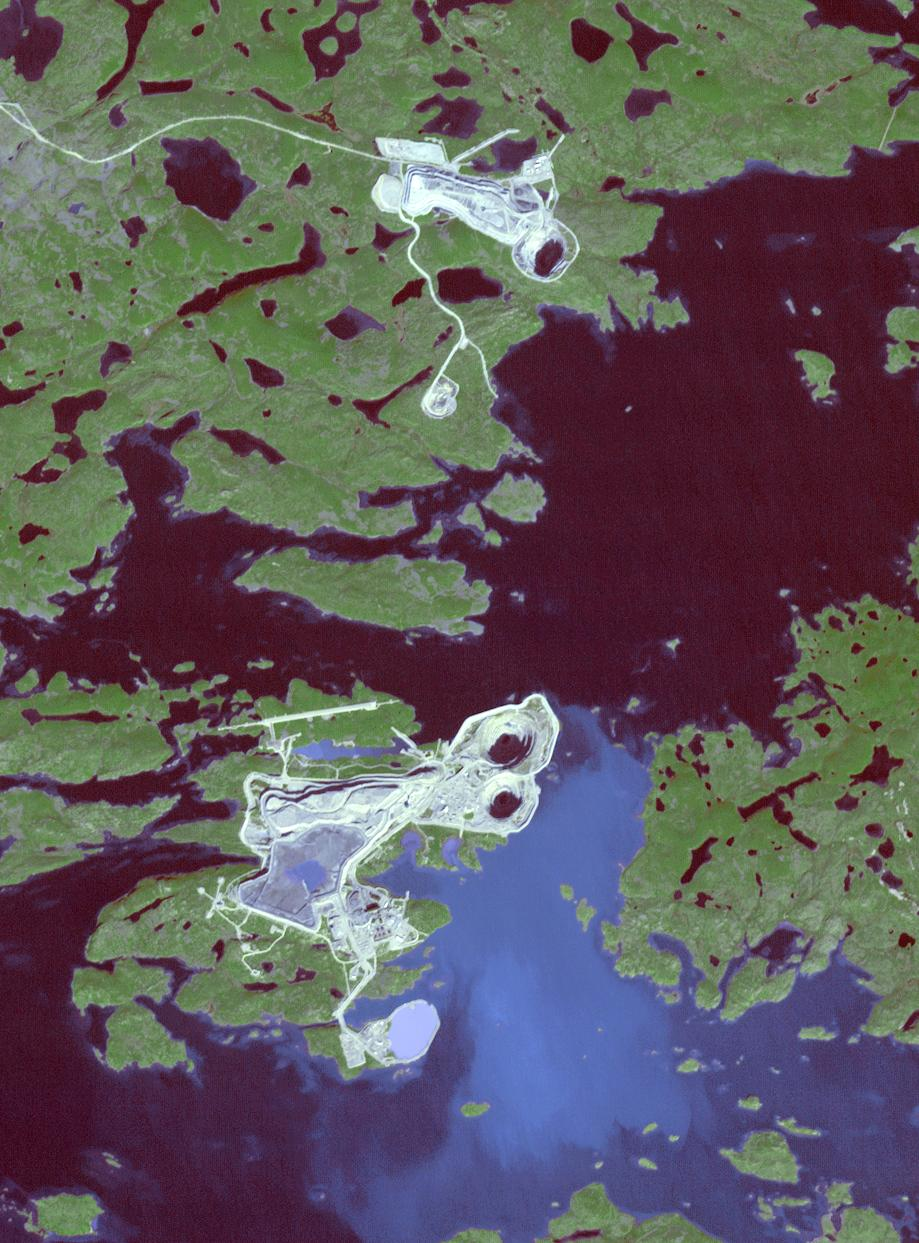
Image acquired by the Advanced Spaceborne Thermal Emission and Reflection Radiometer (ASTER)

The Diavik Diamond Mine was a diamond mine in the North Slave Region of the Northwest Territories, Canada, about 300 km (190 mi) northeast of Yellowknife.

== Description ==
Diavik Diamond Mine is an industrial complex set in a remote, subarctic landscape. It consists of four kimberlite pipes associated with the Lac de Gras kimberlite field and is located on an island 20 km^{2} (7.7 sq mi) in Lac de Gras informally known as East Island. It is about 220 km (140 mi) south of the Arctic Circle.

In the 2015 satellite image below, one can see the two main open pits, waste rock pile, and an airstrip capable of landing aircraft as large as Boeing 737s and C130 Hercules. The complex also houses processing, power and boiler plants, fuel tanks, water and sewage processing facilities, maintenance shop, administrative buildings, and accommodations for workers. It is connected to points south by an ice road and Diavik Airport with a 5,234 ft (1,595 m) gravel runway regularly accommodating Boeing 737s.

== Commercial importance ==
The mine was owned by a joint venture between the Rio Tinto Group (60%) and Dominion Diamond Corporation (40%), and is operated by Yellowknife-based Diavik Diamond Mines Inc., a subsidiary of Rio Tinto Group. Commercial production commenced in 2003, and the lifespan of the mine is expected to be 16 to 22 years. It has become an important part of the regional economy, employing 1,000, and producing approximately 7 million carats (1,400 kg (3,100 lb)) of diamonds annually. Rio Tinto became the sole owner of Diavik Diamond Mine in Canada's Northwest Territories, after the ownership transfer was approved by the Court of Queen's Bench of Alberta.

== History ==
The area was surveyed in 1992, and construction began in 2001, with production commencing in January 2003. In 2006, the ice road from Yellowknife to the Diavik mine and neighbouring mines froze late and thawed early. The Diavik mine could not truck in all the supplies needed for the rest of 2006 before the road closed and arrangements had to be made to bring the remainder of the supplies in by air. Subsequent annual ice road resupply has been completed as planned.

On July 5, 2007, a consortium of seven mining companies, including Rio Tinto, announced they are sponsoring environmental impact studies to construct a deep-water port in Bathurst Inlet. Their plans include building a 211 km (131 mi) road connecting the port to their mines. The port would serve vessels of up to 25,000 tonnes.

In March 2010, underground mining began at the mine. The transition from open pit to underground mining was completed in September 2012.

In September 2012, Diavik completed the construction of the Northwest Territories' first large-scale wind farm. The four-turbine, 9.2-megawatt facility provides 11% (2015) of the Diavik mine's annual power needs and operates at 98% availability. Diesel fuel offset is about five million litres (1,300,000 US gal) per year. Diavik operates the world's largest wind-diesel hybrid power facility at its remote off-grid mine. The wind farm, operational down to −40 °C (−40 °F), sets a new benchmark in cold-climate renewable energy.

In 2015, $US350 million was announced to fund the exploitation of a fourth kimberlite pipe ore body, known as A21. Construction of the A21 rockfill dike (like the other three ore bodies, the A21 kimberlite pipe is under the shallow waters of Lac de Gras) is expected to be complete in 2018, with the first diamonds expected in the fall of that year. To build the dike, Diavik will use the same technologies used to build the A154 and A418 dikes.

In December 2015, Rio Tinto announced the discovery of the 187.7-carat Diavik Foxfire diamond, one of Canada's largest rough gem quality diamonds ever produced. The Diavik Foxfire was bestowed an indigenous name, Noi?eh Kwe, which means caribou crossing stone in the Tlicho First Nation language.

In October 2018, a yellow diamond of 552 carats was found at the mine. This is the largest diamond ever found in North America.

On January 23, 2024, a Northwestern Air charter flight carrying workers to the mine crashed shortly after takeoff from Fort Smith Airport, killing six people and injuring one.

On February 27, 2026, Rio Tinto announced the signing of a closure agreement with the Tłı̨chǫ government.

On March 26, 2026, Rio Tinto celebrated its final day of production. Closure procedures are set to continue winding down until 2029.

== See also ==
- Ekati Diamond Mine
- Snap Lake Diamond Mine
