= Khadija Sharife =

African journalist and author (born 1986)

- Born: 1986; South Africa
- Occupations: Writer, Researcher

Khadija Sharife is a South African journalist and author. Her writing has appeared in numerous publications including Forbes, The Economist, Al Jazeera, Foreign Policy, BBC, African Business, The Thinker, London Review of Books, African Banker, and others.

Sharife has been the Southern Africa correspondent for The Africa Report magazine, assistant Africa editor of Capitalism, Nature, Socialism, and co-author of Tax Us If You Can (Africa).

She was a visiting scholar at the Center for Civil Society (CCS) (2011) based in South Africa, fellow at the World Policy Institute, and coordinated the Africa branch of the European Union-funded Environmental Trade and Liabilities (EJOLT) project.

She works with the Africa desk of Investigative Dashboard and the Organised Crime and Corruption Reporting Project (OCCRP) and is a board member at The Platform to Protect Whistleblowers in Africa (PPLAAF).

Selected articles include:

- "The Thinker (Investigative Analysis): Mauritius - Treasure Island?" All Africa, 29 July 2010
- "Flying a Questionable Flag" in the World Policy Journal, Winter Issue, No.4, December 2010
- "Kimberly's Illicit Process" in the World Policy Journal, Winter Issue, No.4, December 2013
