= Stewart Blusson =

Canadian prospector

Stewart Lynn "Stu" Blusson, OC (born 1939) is a Canadian businessman, geologist, investor, philanthropist, and prospector. He co-discovered the billion-dollar Ekati Diamond Mine, 300 kilometres from Yellowknife, Northwest Territories, Canada. He serves as President of Archon Minerals Ltd. In 2002, Blusson donated key start-up funds necessary for Quest University Canada in Squamish, British Columbia. In 2006, Blusson donated $10 million for the Archon X PRIZE to develop a quick and inexpensive way to sequence the human genome. Blusson had a net worth of $660 million CDN in 2006.

== Early life ==
Blusson was born in Vancouver, British Columbia. He completed an undergraduate degree at the University of British Columbia (1960) and a doctorate in geology at the University of California, Berkeley (1964).

== Career ==
Upon graduation, he joined the federal Geological Survey of Canada, leading regional geological mapping and research programs in the central Yukon and parts of British Columbia. During that time he survived a serious helicopter crash and a Grizzly bear attack. In 1969, Chuck Fipke, a geologist, needed to be rescued from the side of a mountain where he had been stranded for close to a week. Blusson sent in the helicopter pilot that saved him. From this first encounter, Fipke and Blusson became friends and prospecting partners.

He left the Geological Survey in 1979 to explore the modes of formation of mineral deposits from Mexico to the Arctic. He discovered a number of important occurrences of gold, copper and other metals.

Blusson married his wife, Marilyn, in 1980.

In 1981, he and Fipke began searching for diamonds in the Northwest Territories, concentrating their search on indicator minerals commonly associated with kimberlite, a host rock for diamond. They found kimberlitic indicator minerals near Lac de Gras in the Northwest Territories in 1985, and their first kimberlite at Point Lake in 1991.

In 1998, Ekati opened, a joint venture between BHP Diamonds Inc. (51%), Dia Met Minerals (29%), Fipke (10%), and Blusson (10%). Blusson's net worth in 2002 was estimated to be $295 million (US).

In 2004, he was appointed as an Officer of the Order of Canada and was presented with the Logan Medal, Geological Association of Canada's highest honour. In 2012, he was awarded the Queen Elizabeth II Diamond Jubilee Medal.

== Archon X Prize ==
In 2006, Blusson donated the largest medical prize in history, $10 million (US), for the Archon X Prize. The prize is named after the ancient Archean Craton core plate beneath Canada where diamonds were discovered. The prize will go to the person or group that can develop a quick (100 people in 10 days) and inexpensive way to sequence a human genome.

== Philanthropy ==
- 1998- $50-million (Cdn) to the University of British Columbia for genetic research performed by Michael Smith, Nobel laureate
- 2002- $32-million to Quest University Canada in Squamish, British Columbia
- 2006- $5-million (Cdn) to Vancouver Aquarium for an educational program
- 2006- $10-million (Cdn) to the Blusson Spinal Cord Centre which houses ICORD, Vancouver Coastal Health and the Rick Hansen Institute, and is backed by Canadian activist Rick Hansen
- 2006- $10-million (US) to Archon X PRIZE
- 2007- $12-million (Cdn) to the Faculty of Health Sciences at Simon Fraser University, in which the building called Blusson Hall was named in his honour in June 2008.
- 2016- $11-million (Cdn) to the Stewart Blusson Quantum Matter Institute at the University of British Columbia
