= Jimmy Dummett =

Australian cricketer

Personal information
- Full name: William Dummett
- Born: 18 July 1840; Sydney, Australia
- Died: 3 May 1900 (aged 59); New South Wales, Australia
- Source: ESPNcricinfo, 26 December 2016

William "Jimmy" Dummett (18 July 1840 – 3 May 1900) was an Australian cricketer. He played three first-class matches for New South Wales between 1876/77 and 1877/78.

== See also ==
- List of New South Wales representative cricketers
