= Lac de Gras =

Lake in Northwest Territories, Canada

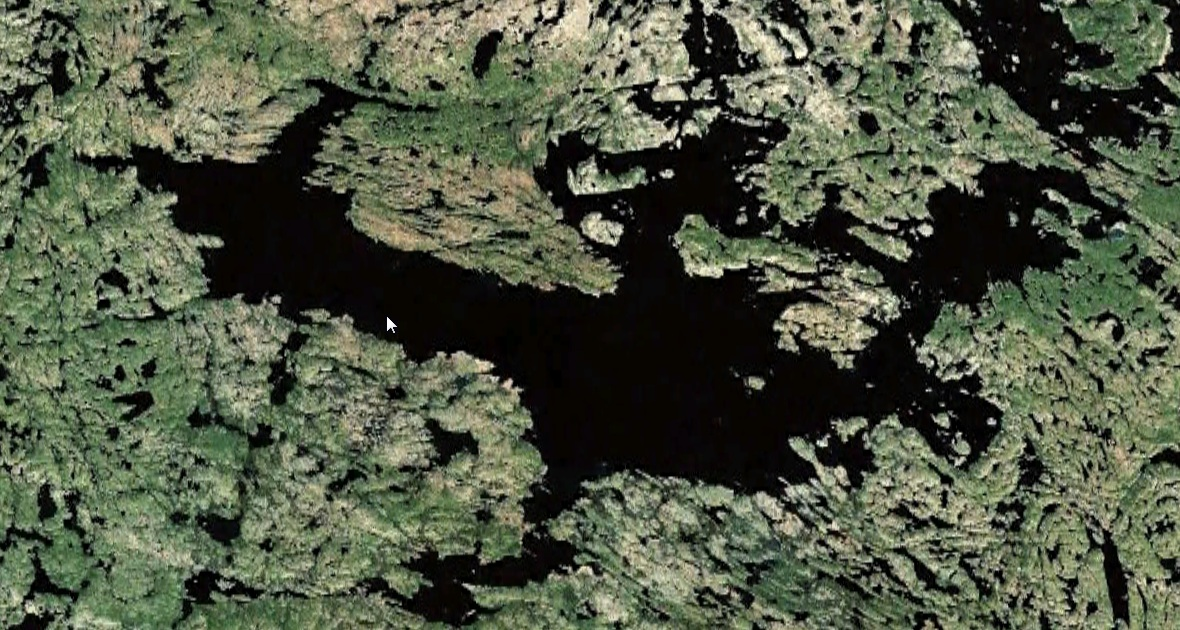
- Lac de Gras

- Location within Northwest Territories
- Location: Northwest Territories
- Coordinates: 64°30′N 110°30′W
- Primary inflows: Coppermine River
- Primary outflows: Coppermine River
- Basin countries: Canada
- Max. length: 60 km (37 mi)
- Max. width: 16 km (9.9 mi)
- Surface area: 569 km^{2} (220 sq mi)
- Max. depth: 56 m (184 ft)
- Shore length^{1}: 740 km (460 mi)
- Surface elevation: 396 m (1,299 ft)
- ^{1} Shore length is not a well-defined measure.

Lac de Gras is a lake approximately 300 kilometres (190 mi) north east of Yellowknife, in the Northwest Territories of Canada. Lac de Gras was the centre of the diamond rush of the 1990s. There are two working, and one closed, diamond mines in the area, Diavik Diamond Mine, Ekati Diamond Mine, and the care and maintenance Snap Lake Diamond Mine. It was called Ekati by aboriginal peoples.

The lake is ultraoligotrophic but supports a slow-growing but stable population of some eight species of cold-water fishes, including round whitefish, cisco, and lake trout. Lake trout dominate the lake, both numerically and in terms of biomass. Other native fish species include common whitefish, Arctic grayling, burbot, longnose sucker, and slimy sculpin.

Diavik Diamond Mines conducted open-pit mining of kimberlite pipes using explosives near the lake.

Lac de Gras' surface area is 56,910.8 ha (140,630 acres); the historical surface area was 57,107.2 ha (141,115 acres), about 196.4 ha larger than today. The subbasin area is 413,570 ha (1,022,000 acres) with the number of lakes smaller than 1 ha 3,487; 1-10 ha 2,080; 10-100 ha 663; and larger 100 ha 106, together with a total surface area of 135,035 ha (333,680 acres).

Lac du Sauvage is a small lake that drains into Lac de Gras through a 45 m (148 ft) wide and 210 m (690 ft) long stream called the Narrows. The median flood peak discharge in the Narrows is 17.5 m^{3}/s (620 cu ft/s) making it an important corridor for fish movements.

== See also ==
- Lac de Gras kimberlite field
- List of lakes in the Northwest Territories
