= Point Lake =

Lake in Northwest Territories, Canada

- Location within Northwest Territories

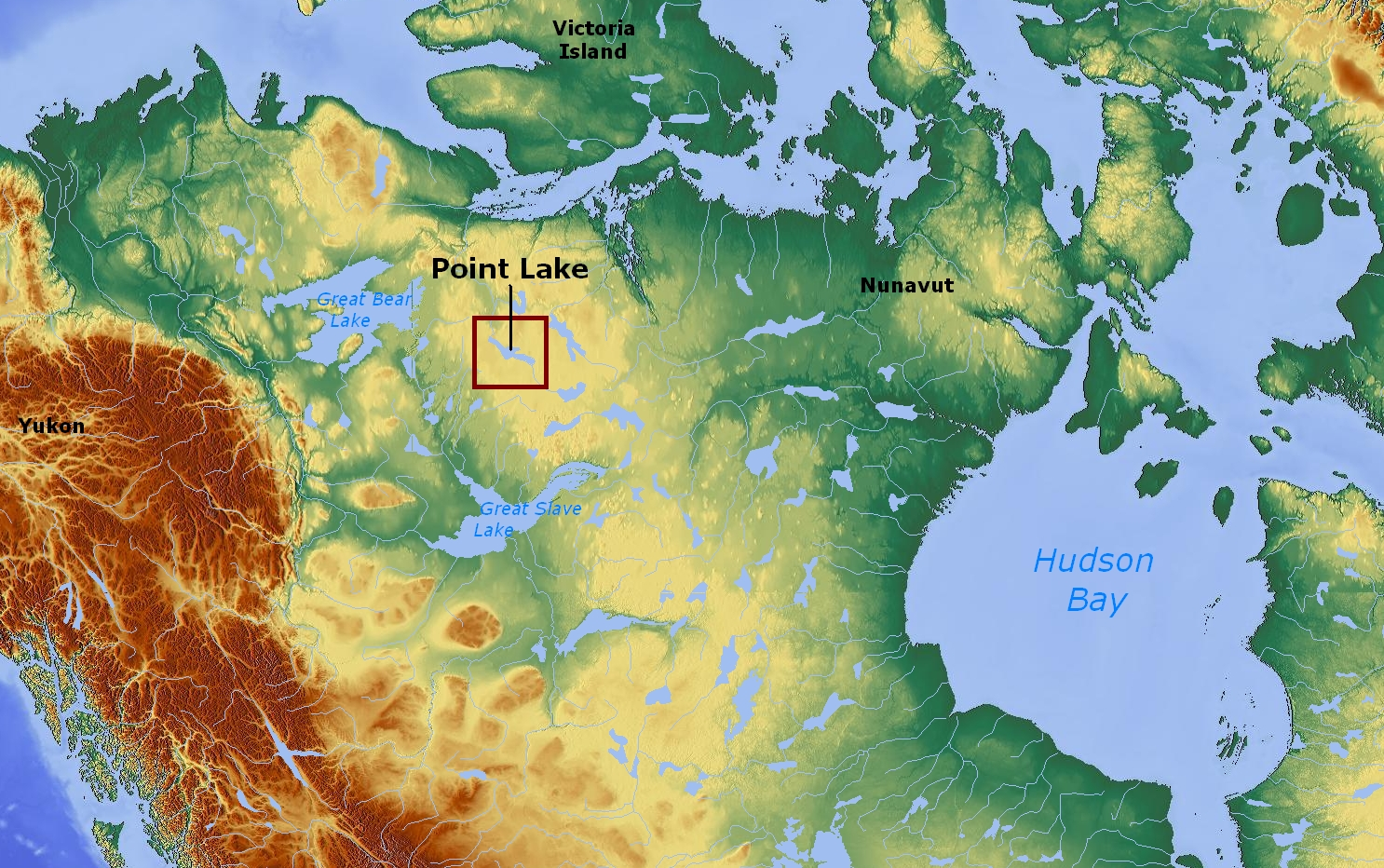
- Location: Northwest Territories
- Coordinates: 65°14′N 113°09′W
- Basin countries: Canada
- Surface area: 701 km^{2} (271 sq mi)
- Surface elevation: 375 m (1,230 ft)

Point Lake is a lake in the Northwest Territories, Canada.

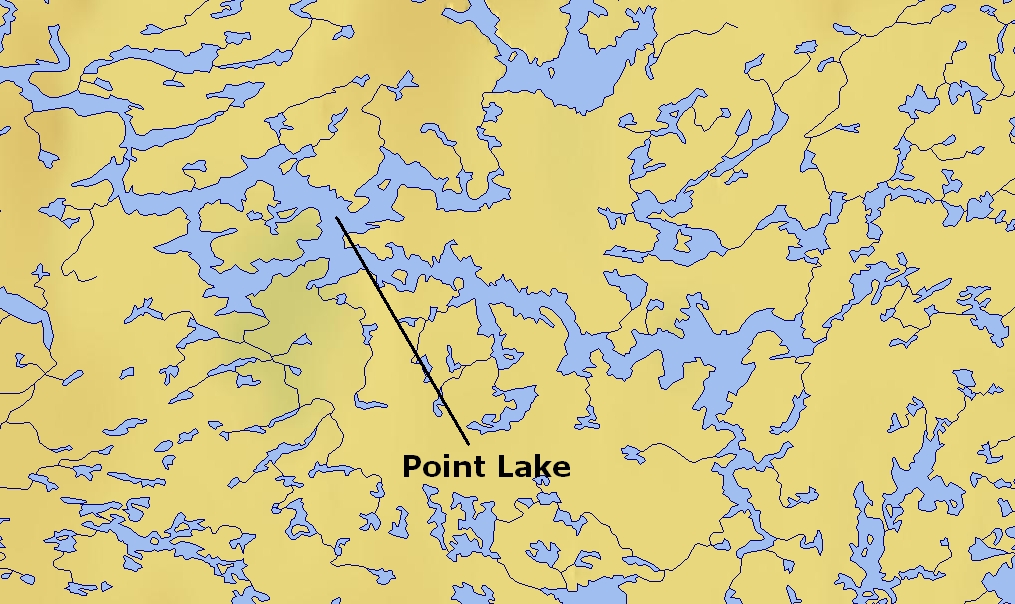
Map

== See also ==
- List of lakes in the Northwest Territories
- List of lakes of Canada
