= Lac de Gras kimberlite field =

Geologic region in Northwest Territories, Canada

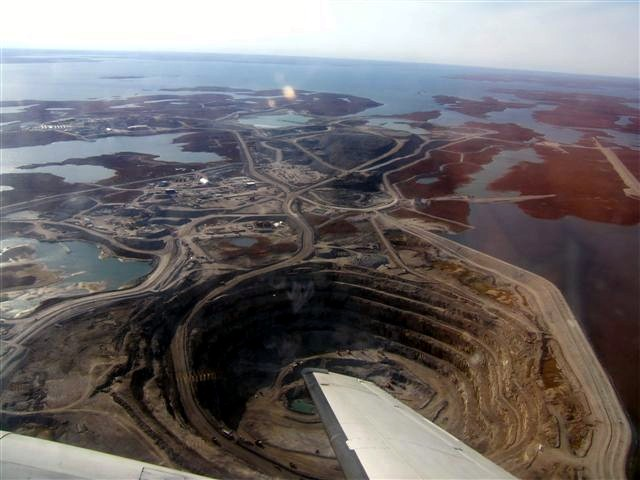
Diavik Diamond Mine consists of three diatremes associated with the Lac de Gras kimberlite field

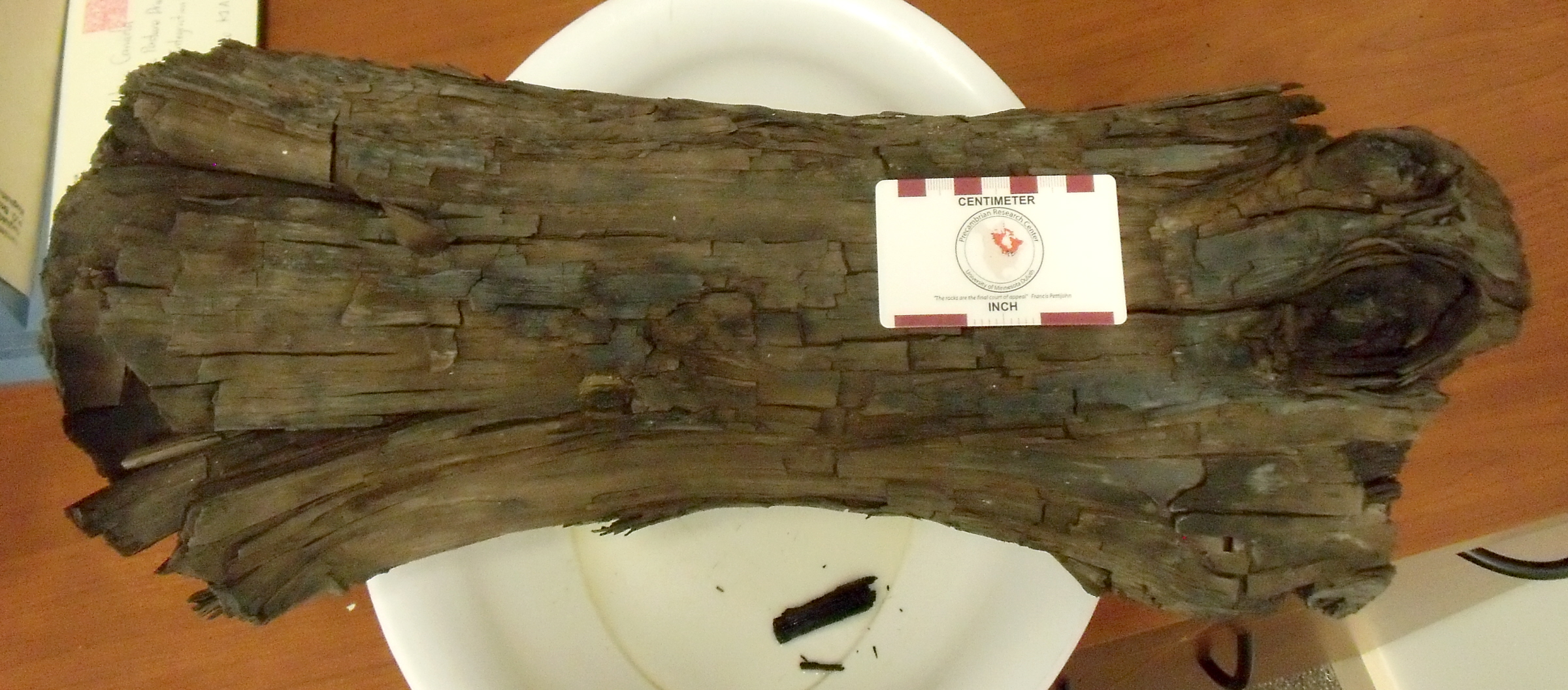
This approximately 53-million-year-old Metasequoia sample was preserved by falling into an erupting gaseous, relatively cool (~400°C) Lac de Gras kimberlite pipe. The volcanic kimberlite pipe now lies in permafrost north of the current tree line.

The Lac de Gras kimberlite field is a group of Late Cretaceous to Eocene age diatremes in the Northwest Territories, Canada.

The Eocene (ca. 55-50 Ma) age diatremes of the Lac de Gras kimberlite field support two world-class diamond mines called Ekati and Diavik. Ekati, Canada's first diamond mine, has produced 40,000,000 carats (8,000 kg) of diamonds out of six open pits between 1998 and 2008, while Diavik to the southeast has produced 35,400,000 carats (7,080 kg) of diamonds since its foundation in 2003.

== See also ==
- List of volcanoes in Canada
- List of volcanic fields
- Volcanism of Northern Canada
