= Mountain Province Diamonds =

Mountain Province Diamonds Inc.
- Type: Public
- Traded as: TSX: MPVD
- Industry: Mining
- Headquarters: Toronto, Canada
- Key people: Jonathan Comerford - Chairman and Director; Stuart Brown - President and CEO
- Website: http://www.mountainprovince.com/

Mountain Province Diamonds Inc. is major (49%) partner with De Beers in the Gahcho Kue Diamond Mine Project in the Northwest Territories. Gahcho Kué is the world's largest and richest new diamond mine, with an estimated reserve of 80 million carats. The agreement between Mountain Province Diamonds and De Beers is one where both companies share the operating costs of the mine and each independently markets their share of the diamonds from the project.

In January 2017 Mountain Province announced it had completed its first sale of diamonds originating from mining operations at its Gahcho Kue Diamond Mine Project in the Northwest Territories. Approximately 49,420 carats were sold for proceeds of US$6.27 million, representing an average sale price of approximately US$127 per carat.
