= Snap Lake Diamond Mine =

Mine in the Northwest Territories of Canada

Snap Lake Mine
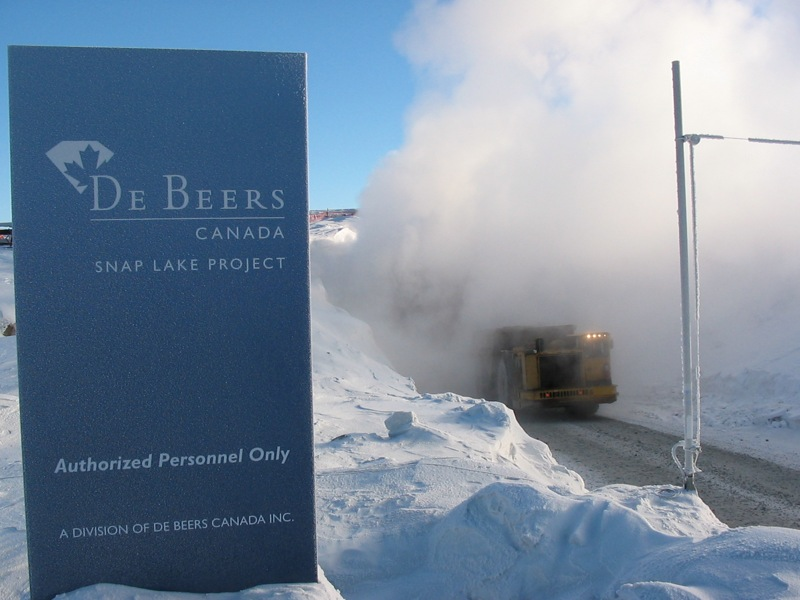
- A mining truck exiting the mine portal, winter 2006

- Location in Canada
- Location: 220 km (140 mi) northeast of Yellowknife, Northwest Territories, Canada; 63°36′20″N 110°52′00″W
- Products: Diamonds
- Opened: 2008
- Active: 2008 - 2015
- Company: De Beers
- Website: canada.debeersgroup.com
- Acquired: 2001

Snap Lake Mine was a remote fly-in/fly-out operation located about 220 km (140 mi) northeast of Yellowknife, Northwest Territories, and, according to De Beers, was the first De Beers mine outside of Africa. It was also Canada's first completely underground diamond mine.

Construction began with the opening of an access winter road in 2005. By the end of 2013, De Beers had spent US$1.8 billion on construction and mine operation. Of that total, De Beers spent US$1.3 billion with Northwest Territories-based contractors and suppliers, including US$723 million with Aboriginal businesses or joint ventures.

The mine began commercial production on January 16, 2008 and was officially opened on July 25, 2008. In 2013, Snap Lake Mine provided 776 person years of employment, including 274 person years of employment to Northwest Territories residents, close to the 300 NWT resident employees predicted during the mine’s environmental assessment. Approximately 400 people are working at the mine on any given day. Lifetime of the mine was estimated to be about 15 years. Resource estimates suggest 16.1 million carats over life of mine.

The Snap Lake mine was featured in Ice Road Truckers, a television series on The History Channel. The Snap Lake mine was also featured on the Canadian Discovery channel show Daily Planet as part of the special feature 'Daily Planet Goes North – More Ice for the Arctic'.

The mine was served by the Snap Lake Airport, a private airport that was strictly for cargo and passengers entering and leaving the remote site.

== Closure ==
On December 4, 2015, De Beers announced that due to a drop in the market price of diamonds and a necessary costly license exemption they would stop production of diamonds at the Snap Lake Mine, putting it into "care and maintenance" state so that it could be re-opened at a later date if so desired. Approximately 70 employees would remain on the site as a result, but 434 were laid off.

== See also ==
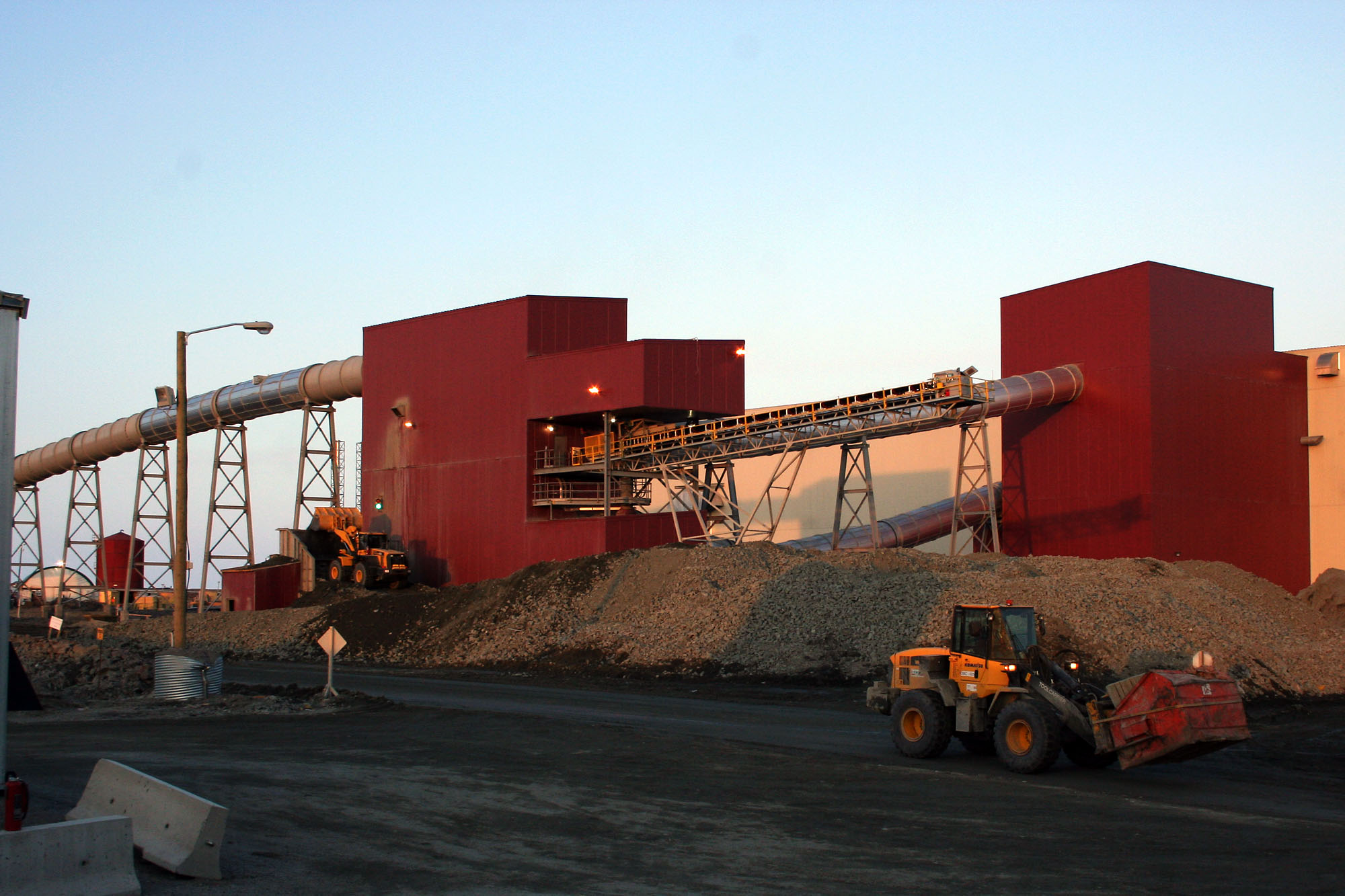
Two loaders work outside the ore processing and recovery plant.

- Ekati Diamond Mine
- Diavik Diamond Mine
- Volcanism of Northern Canada
