= Forevermark =

Diamond and jewellery company

- Industry: Jewellery
- Founded: 2008
- Key people: Nancy Liu CEO
- Products: Diamonds
- Website: forevermark.com

Forevermark is a diamond company and subsidiary of De Beers Group.

Forevermark currently operates in China, Hong Kong, India, Japan, and the United States. Forevermark is present in 32 markets in total across Europe, Asia, Australia, and the United States, and has over 2,400 outlets.

== History ==
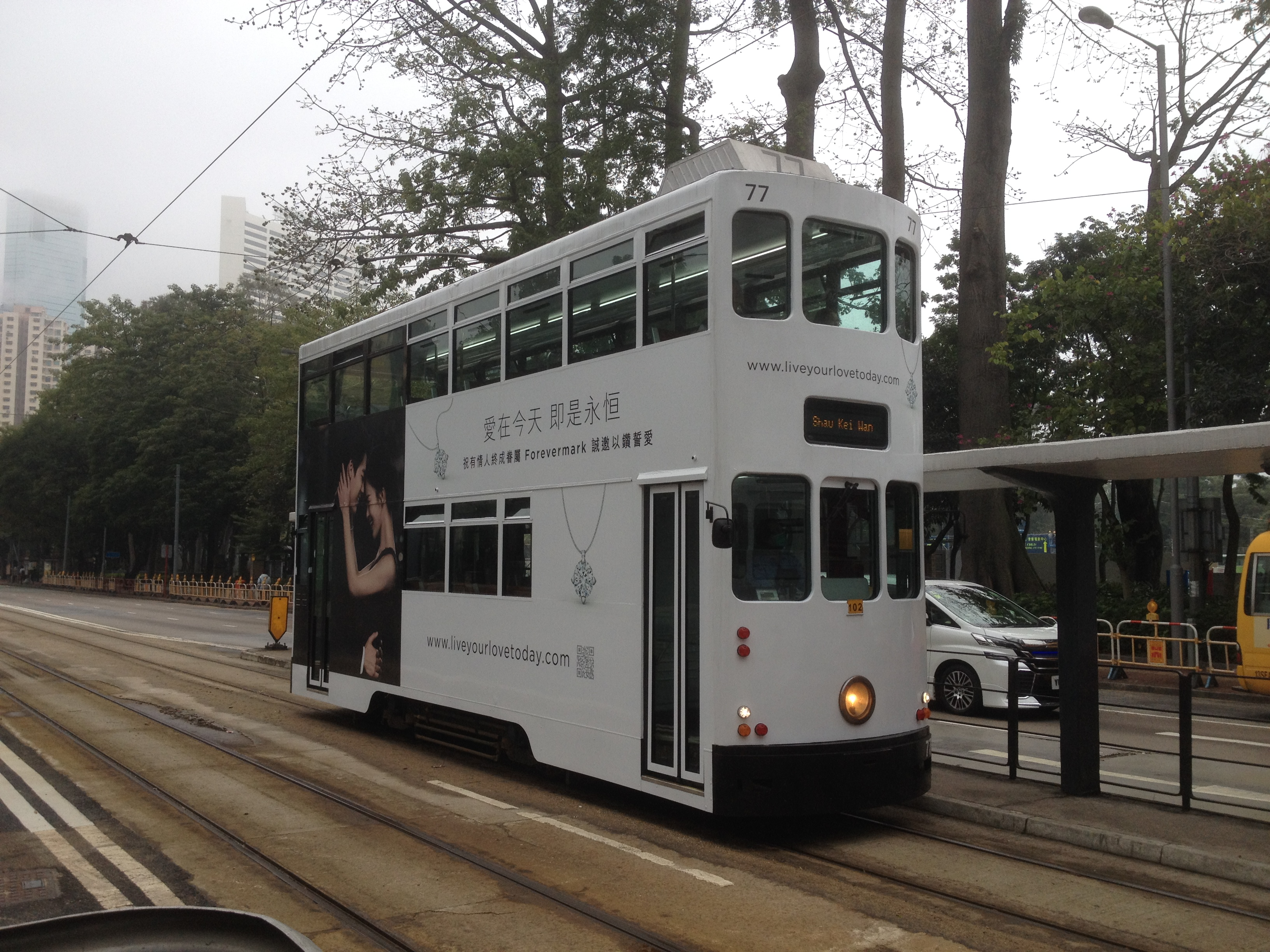
Forevermark advertisement on a Hong Kong tram, in 2016.

Forevermark was launched in 2008 as part of De Beers Group. It focused on Asia, establishing Forevermark's first markets in Hong Kong, China, and Japan later in 2009. In 2011, the brand was introduced in the United States and India. Also in 2011, British jewelry designer Stephen Webster began a signature bridal collection with Forevermark.

In 2016, Forevermark announced their Black Label Collection. Also in 2016, British jeweller Theo Fennell partnered with Forevermark for his new signature collection.

In 2017, Forevermark launched the Forevermark Zanyah collection in partnership with couturier Sabyasachi Mukherjee. Also in 2017, the company started their Forevermark Tribute Collection in the U.S. and Canada.

In 2018, Forevermark opened Libert'aime by Forevermark, a new concept store in China that would be specifically designed to tailor to millennial generation shopping habits. As part of the Tusk Rhino Trail conservation effort, Forevermark partnered with artist Dave White for a sculpture in 2018.

In 2019, Nancy Liu replaced Stephen Lussier as CEO of Forevermark. Also in 2019, the company expanded their Forevermark Tribute Collection to India and Malaysia. In June 2019, Forevermark launched their Engagement & Commitment collection in the U.S.

=== Inscriptions ===
The Forevermark inscription is placed on the table facet of a diamond using proprietary technology from De Beers Group. The inscription is 1/20 of a micron deep (equivalent to 1/5000 the width of a human hair), and it is not visible to the naked eye.
