= Burgundy Diamond Mines =

Australian diamond mining company

Burgundy Diamond Mines Ltd
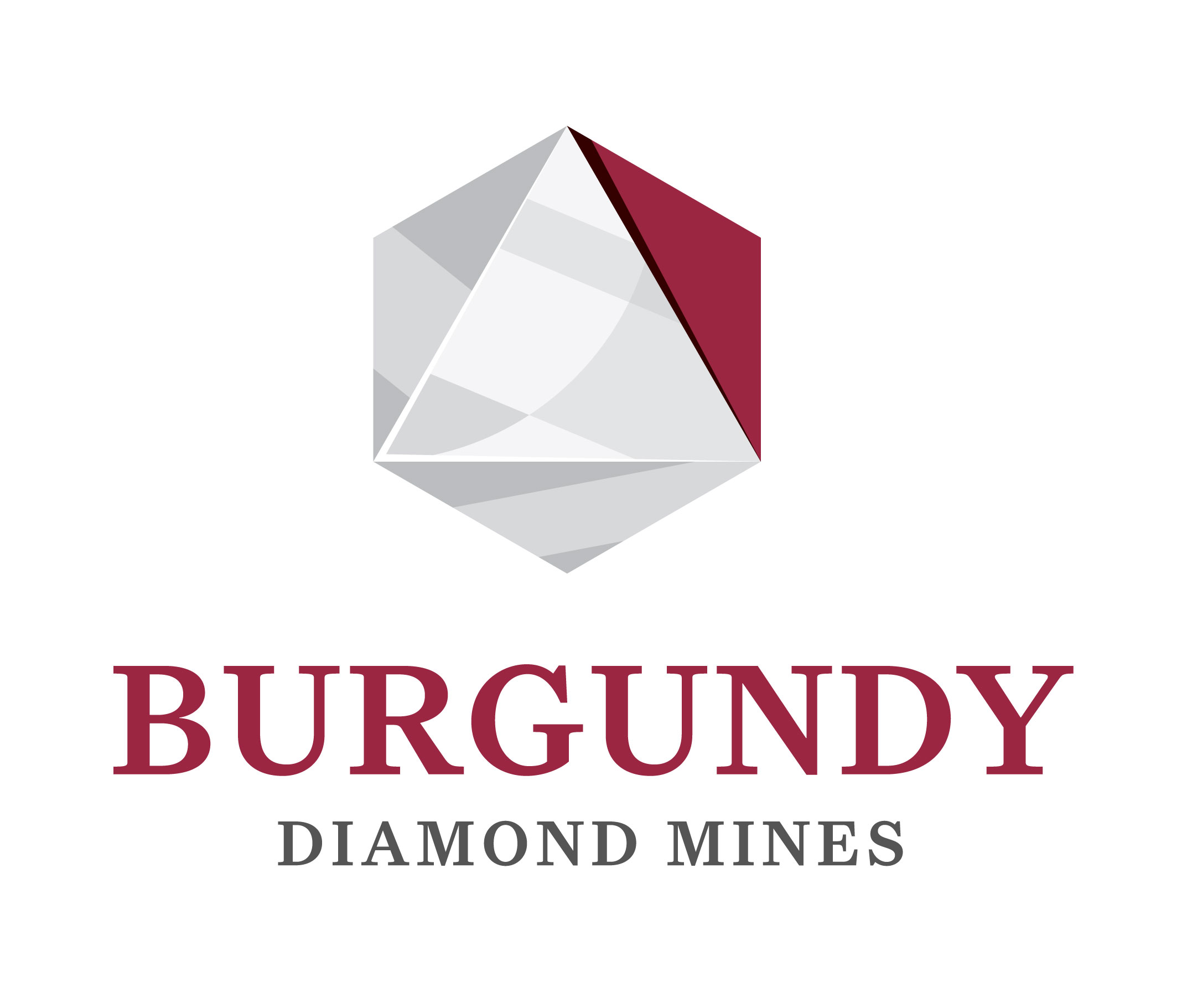
- Type: Public
- Traded as: ASX: BDM
- Industry: Nonmetallic Mineral Mining
- Founded: 2012
- Headquarters: Suite 900, 606 4th Street SW Calgary, Alberta, T2P 1T1, Canada
- Products: Diamonds
- Revenue: ▼US$186.2 million (2025)
- Net income: ▼US$86.8 million (2025)
- Number of employees: 1625 (including contractors).
- Website: burgundydiamonds.com

Burgundy Diamond Mines Limited is an Australian diamond mining company. It primarily operates in Canada, where it owns the Ekati Diamond Mine. Burgundy is publicly traded on the Australian Stock Exchange (ASX:BDM) and is the parent company of Arctic Canadian Diamond Company Limited. The company sources its gem-quality diamonds from the Ekati Diamond Mine, located in the Northwest Territories, Canada. The company has a corporate office in Calgary, Alberta, Canada, a rough diamond sales office in Antwerp, Belgium, and a cut and polishing facility in Perth, Australia.

== History ==
Burgundy Diamond Mines Limited was initially known as EHR Resources Limited, an exploration company focused on a single gold and silver project, and publicly traded on the Australian Stock Exchange (ASX:EHX) since January 3, 2013.

On November 20, 2020, EHR Resources changed its name to Burgundy Diamond Mines to reflect the company’s transition into a developer of diamond projects with investments into the Naujaat Diamond Project in Canada’s Northwest Territories and the Botswana Exploration Alliance.

On March 24, 2021, Burgundy Diamond Mines signed an option deed with Glibb River Diamonds Ltd. (ASX:GLB) to acquire 100% ownership of the Ellendale Diamond Project and Blina projects in the West Kimberly region of Australia. The company decided not to exercise the option to acquire the Ellendale Diamond Project on March 20, 2023.

In July 2022, Burgundy launched its luxury diamond brand Maison Mazerea.

On March 14, 2023, Burgundy announced that it had entered into a share purchase agreement with the Arctic Canadian Diamond companies (Arctic Canadian Diamond Holding LLC to acquire 100 percent of the issued capital in Arctic Canadian Diamond Company Ltd. and Arctic Canadian Diamond Marketing N.V.). The transaction closed in July 2023, making Burgundy Diamond Mines a fully-integrated, global-scale company that has the ability to trace the full chain of custody of high-quality sourced diamonds from Ekati Diamond Mine in Canada directly to its customers.

In September 2024, Burgundy paused its plans to develop an underground project at one of the Ekati diamond mine's pits. Also in September the company called for reduced regulations in the region. Some of their requests to the NWT include lowering the amount of money the mine must set aside for reclamation costs and a guarantee that Ekati's impact benefit agreements will be grandfathered in when the Mineral Resources Act is revised, which would help Burgundy avoid any new requirements to pay Indigenous groups impacted by the mine.

In September 2025, Burgundy requested a trading halt on the ASX, citing the impacts on U.S. Tariffs on India, where 90% of its diamonds are cut and polished. The company subsequently received a CA$155 million loan from the Canada Enterprise Emergency Funding Corporation, a Canadian Crown corporation, under the Large Enterprise Tariff Loan (LETL) program, which is intended to provide relief to Canadian companies impacted by U.S. tariffs.. Burgundy received a second LETL for an additional $60 million in March 2026.

Despite the loans, Burgundy subsidiary Arctic Canadian Diamond Company, the owners of the Ekati mine, received bankruptcy protection under the Companies' Creditors Arrangement Act (CCAA) in May of 2026. In addition to the U.S. tariffs on India, the company cited the impacts on diamond prices from competition from lab-grown diamonds, a decline in Chinese consumer spending, a global oversupply of diamonds, and an increase in fuel costs due to the 2026 Iran war as the cause of its financial position. The company stated it plans to keep operating the Ekati mine during the CCAA process.

On 14 July 2026, after an unsuccessful sales process, the Government of the Northwest Territories applied for and was granted a receivership order over the mine. The court appointed PwC as receiver to oversee the shutdown and reclamation of the mine. The reclamation will be funded by $325 million in surety bonds, cash deposits, and trust funds held by the NWT Government as reclamation security.

== See also ==
- Diamonds as an investment
