= Ekati Diamond Mine =

Mine near Yellowknife, Northwest Territories, Canada

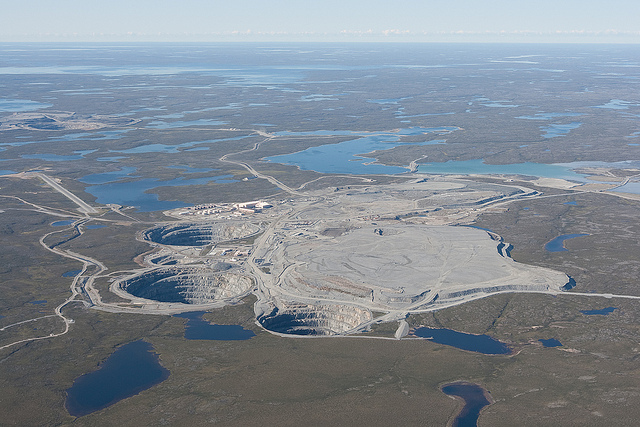
- Ekati mine aerial view, August 2010. Four open pits on four kimberlite pipes may be seen, along with the Ekati airport.

- Location in Canada, Ekati Diamond Mine (Canada)
- Location: Lac de Gras, Northwest Territories, Canada; 64°42′49″N 110°37′10″W
- Products: Diamonds
- Discovered: 1991
- Opened: 1998
- Company: Burgundy Diamond Mines
- Website: burgundydiamonds.com

The Ekati Diamond Mine, often simply called Ekati, was Canada's first surface and underground diamond mine and is owned by Burgundy Diamond Mines. It is located 310 km (190 mi) north-east of Yellowknife, Northwest Territories, and about 200 km (120 mi) south of the Arctic Circle, near Lac de Gras. Until 2014, Ekati was a joint venture between Dominion Diamond Mines (80%), Chuck Fipke, and Stewart Blusson, the two geologists who discovered kimberlite pipes north of Lac de Gras. Fipke and Blusson each held 10% stake in the mine, until Fipke sold his share to Dominion. In 2021, Arctic Canadian Diamond Company Ltd. acquired the Ekati Diamond Mine with associated assets and liabilities from Dominion Diamond Mines. In July 2023, Burgundy Diamond Mines purchased full control of Arctic Canadian Diamond Company.

== History ==
The first volcanic pipe found in the Lac de Gras region was the Point Lake kimberlite, discovered by Chuck Fipke and Stewart Blusson who had been prospecting in the region for almost ten years, having found kimberlite indicator minerals as early as 1985. The Point Lake kimberlite was determined to be uneconomic, but its discovery precipitated one of largest staking rushes in mining history, covering most of the area between Yellowknife and the Arctic coast. There are 156 known kimberlite pipes within the Ekati block of claims, including the Point Lake pipe. Ekati officially began operations on October 14, 1998, and was operated by BHP. Since the opening until 2017, the mine produced around 67,800,000 carats (13,560 kg; 29,890 lb) of diamonds and is still in production.

The mine was owned by Dominion Diamond Mines ULC, formerly named the Harry Winston Diamond Corporation, until the company went bankrupt due to the COVID-19 pandemic.

As of July 2023, the mine has been owned by Burgundy Diamond Mines. There are currently three underground kimberlites (Koala, Koala North, and Panda) and the rest are mined by surface mining. As of 2024, the active operations include Sable and Misery underground with Point Lake ready to go into production as an open pits later in the year.

In May 2026 Arctic Canadian Diamond Company, the Burgundy subsidiary that owned Ekati, received bankruptcy protection under the Companies' Creditors Arrangement Act (CCAA). In addition to the U.S. tariffs on India, the company cited the impacts on diamond prices from competition from lab-grown diamonds, a decline in Chinese consumer spending, a global oversupply of diamonds, and an increase in fuel costs due to the 2026 Iran war as the cause of its financial position. The company stated it planned to keep operating the Ekati mine during the CCAA process.

On 14 July 2026, after an unsuccessful sales process, the Government of the Northwest Territories applied for and was granted a receivership order over the mine. The court appointed PwC as receiver to oversee the shutdown and reclamation of the mine. The reclamation will be funded by $325 million in surety bonds, cash deposits, and trust funds held by the NWT Government as reclamation security.

== Geology ==
Diamonds at the Ekati site are found in 62–45 million-year-old kimberlite pipes (Creaser et al., 2004) of the Lac de Gras kimberlite field, most of which lie underneath shallow lakes.

== Mining and marketing ==
Between 1998 and 2009, the mine has produced 40,000,000 carats (8,000 kg; 18,000 lb) of diamonds out of six open pits. As the high grade ore close to surface was depleted, development was completed to access the ore utilizing underground methods. The mine's current annual production is estimated to be approximately 7,500,000 carats (1,500 kg; 3,310 lb) of diamonds.

There are numerous options to extend the mine life at Ekati through 2028 including continuation of Misery underground at depth, evaluation alternatives for expansion at Point Lake, transforming Sable to an underground operation following open pit completion, exploring Fox as an underground opportunity and maximizing resources in the Fox stockpile. In addition, the underwater remote mining provides additional opportunities to extract diamonds through kimberlite pipes with a trial that will start at Lynx pit in 2025.

== Transportation ==
Mine workers fly-in fly-out through Ekati Airport.

== Gallery ==
Ekati site
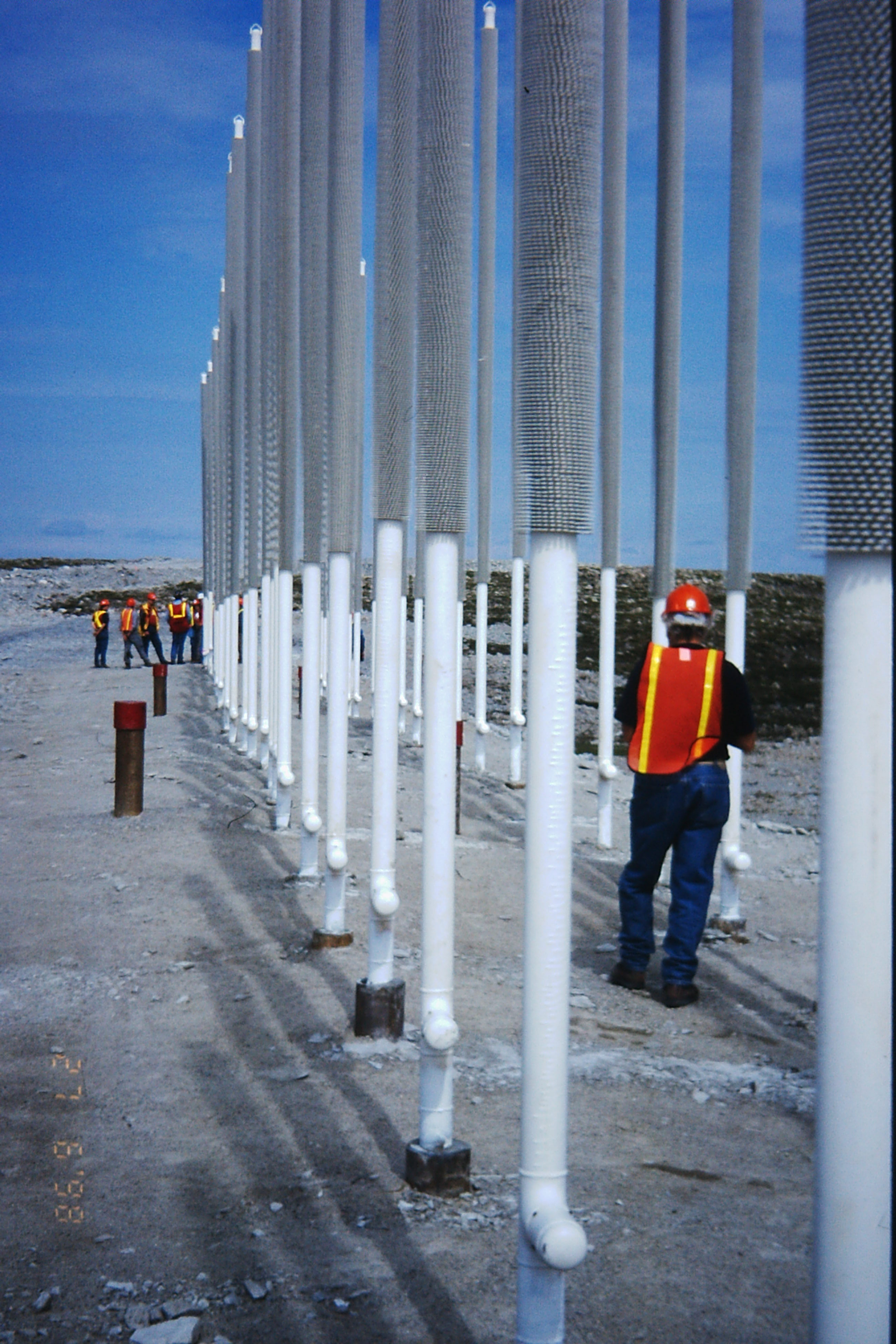
The mining near the Lac de Gras lakes needs the construction of Frozen Dam Cores with heat pipes for creating permafrost. Here, this artificially created frozen ground prevents seepage from a containment pond for tailings.

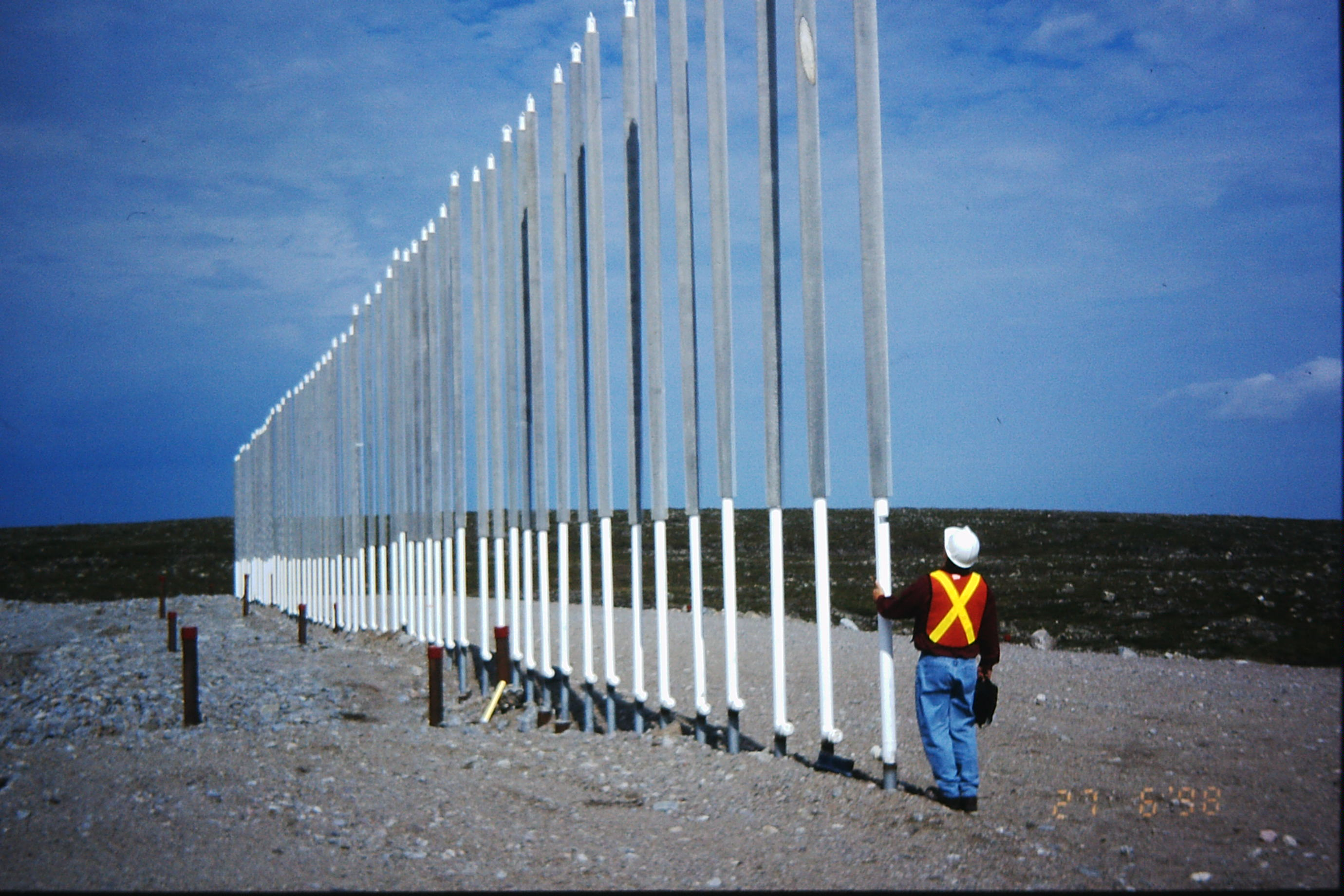
Heat pipes keep ground frozen and inhibit water transfer into the open pit during mining activities in July 1998.

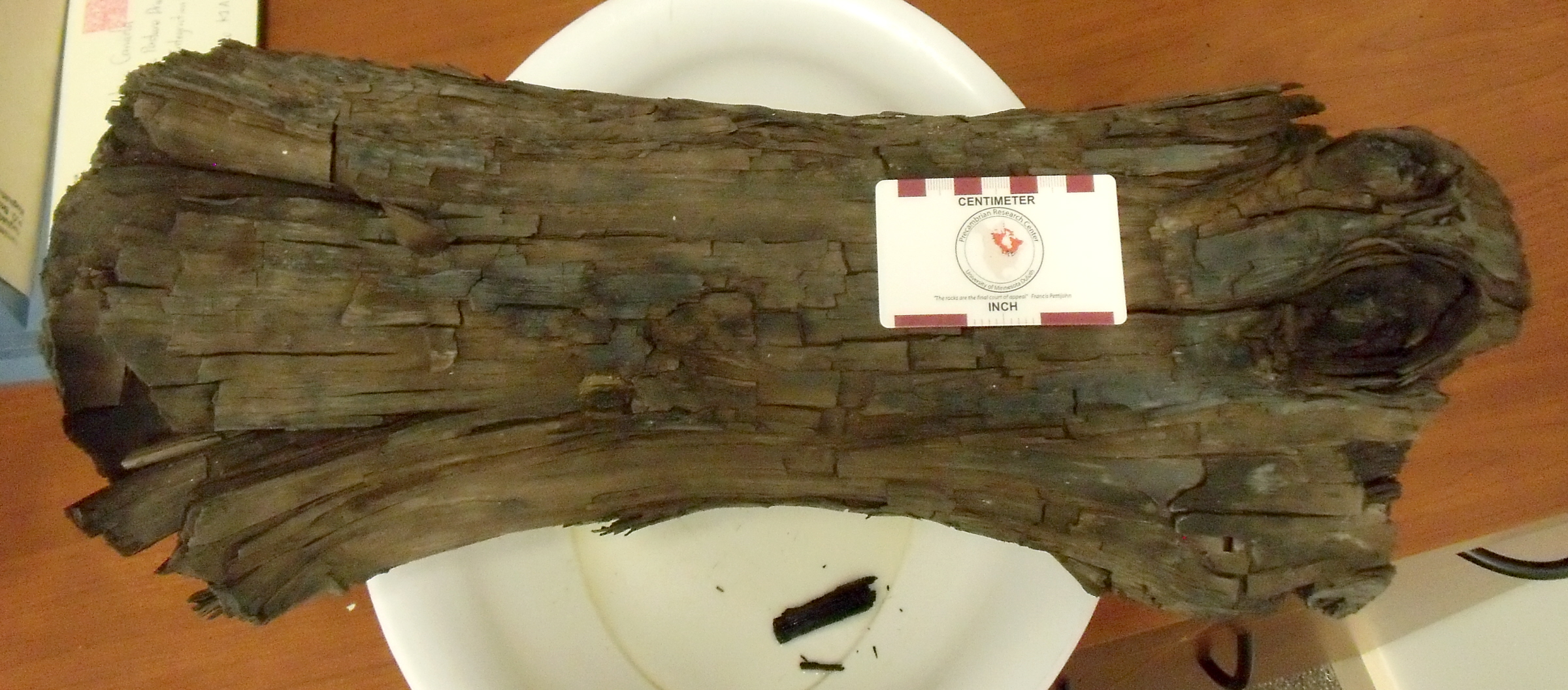
Metasequoia wood from 53 million years BP, recovered from a kimberlite pipe at Ekati Diamond Mine.

== See also ==
- Hugo Dummett of BHP, credited as co-discoverer of Ekati
- Volcanism of Canada
- Volcanism of Northern Canada
