= De Beers =

International corporation specialising in diamonds

De Beers UK Limited

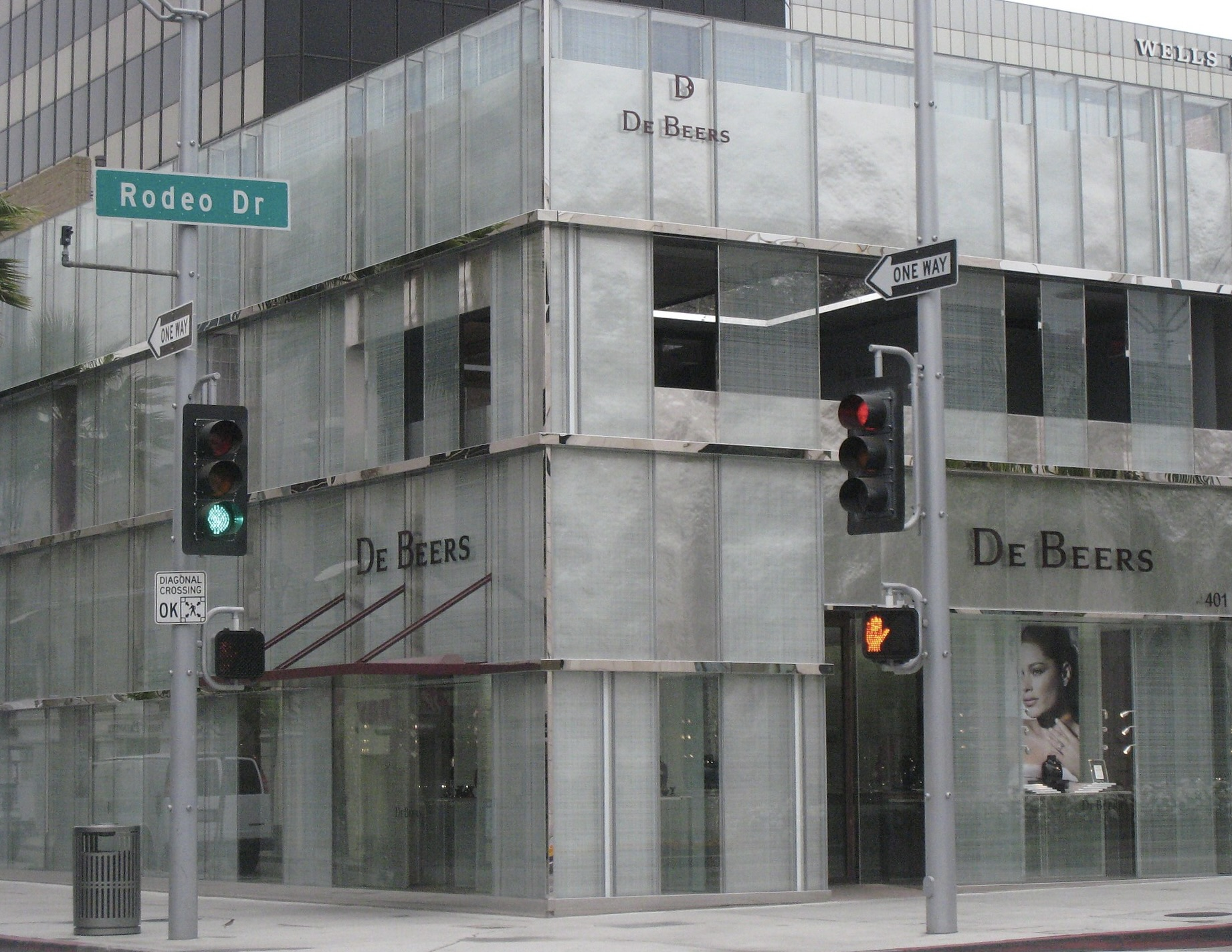
- DeBeers store on Rodeo Drive in Beverly Hills, California, in 2008
- Industry: Mining and trading of diamonds
- Founded: 1888; 138 years ago
- Founder: Cecil Rhodes
- Headquarters: London, England, UK; Johannesburg, South Africa
- Area served: Worldwide
- Key people: Duncan Wanblad (chairman); Al Cook (CEO)
- Products: Diamonds
- Brands: De Beers London, Forevermark, Lightbox, ORIGIN - De Beers Group, A Diamond is Forever, Element Six
- Services: Diamond mining, marketing, grading and jewellery
- Revenue: ▲US$6.08 billion (2018)
- Owners: Anglo American plc (85%); Government of Botswana (15%)
- Number of employees: c. 20,000
- Website: debeersgroup.com

De Beers Group is a British multinational diamond company that specialises in the mining, trading and marketing of diamonds. It operates in 35 countries, with mining taking place in Botswana, Namibia, South Africa, and Canada. It also has an artisanal mining business, Gemfair, which operates in Sierra Leone.

From its inception in 1888 until the start of the 21st century, De Beers controlled 80% to 85% of rough diamond distribution and was considered a monopoly. By 2000, the company's control of the world diamond supply decreased to 63%. By 2021, its share of the diamond supply had fallen to 25%, equal to Alrosa's share.

The company was founded in 1888 by British businessman Cecil Rhodes, who was financed by the South African diamond magnate Alfred Beit and the London-based N M Rothschild & Sons bank. In 1926, Ernest Oppenheimer, a German immigrant to Britain and later South Africa who had earlier founded mining company Anglo American with financial backing from J.P. Morgan & Co, was elected to the board of De Beers. He built and consolidated the company's global monopoly over the diamond industry until his death in 1957. During this time, he was involved in several controversies, including price fixing and trust behaviour, and was accused of not releasing industrial diamonds for the US war effort during World War II.

In 2011, Anglo American took control of De Beers after buying the Oppenheimers' family stake of 40% for US$5.1 billion (£3.2 billion) and increasing its stake to 85%, ending the 80-year Oppenheimer control of the company. The company is currently owned 85% by Anglo American and 15% by the Government of Botswana.

In May 2024, Anglo American announced its intention to spin off or sell De Beers.

== History ==
=== Foundation ===
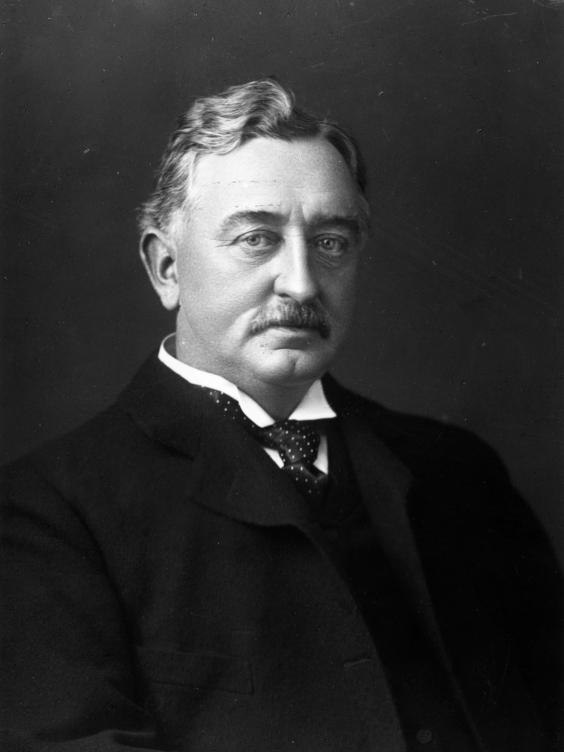
Cecil Rhodes founded De Beers in 1888

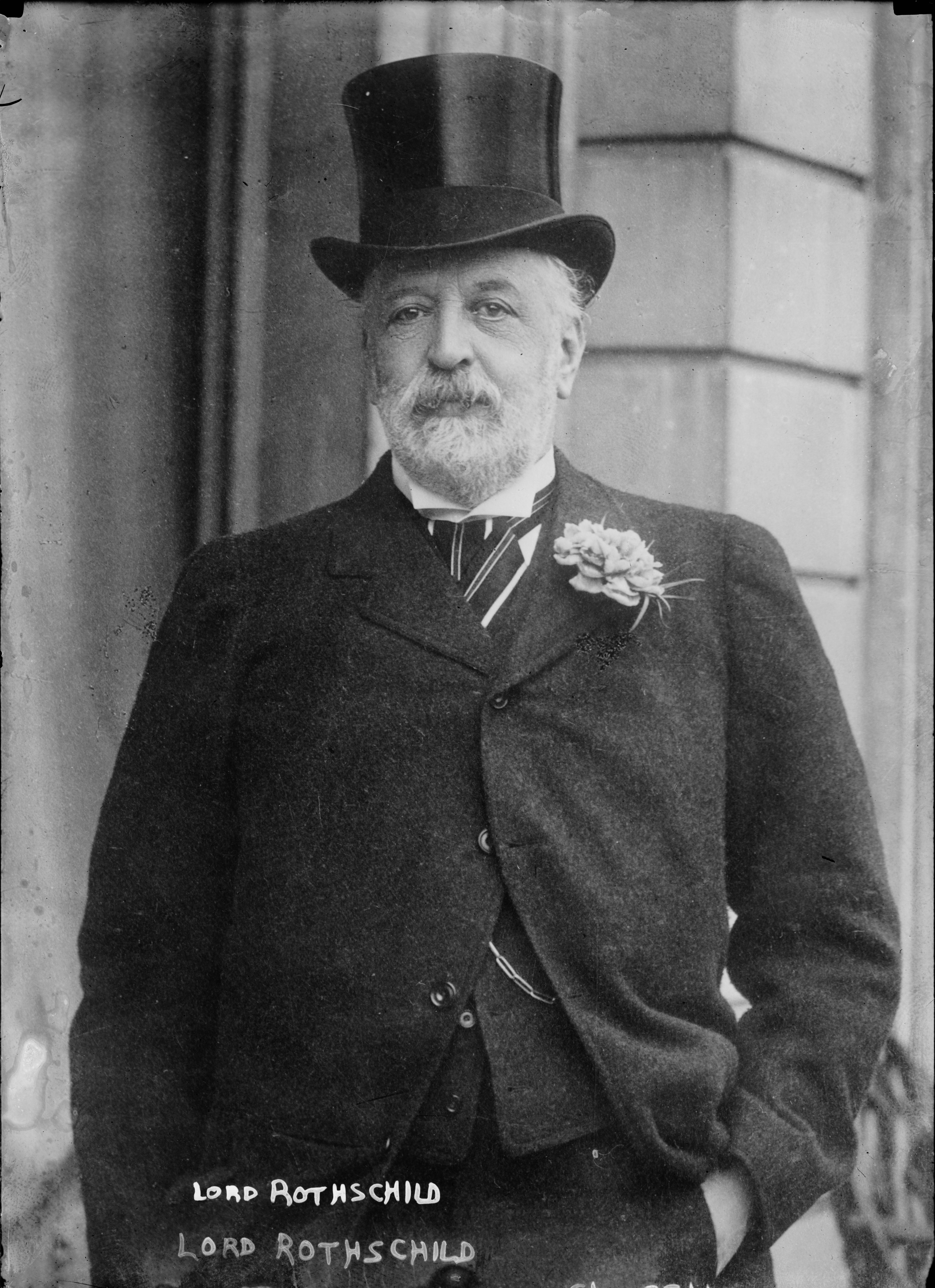
Nathan Rothschild, 1st Baron Rothschild, of the Rothschild family, funded the development of De Beers

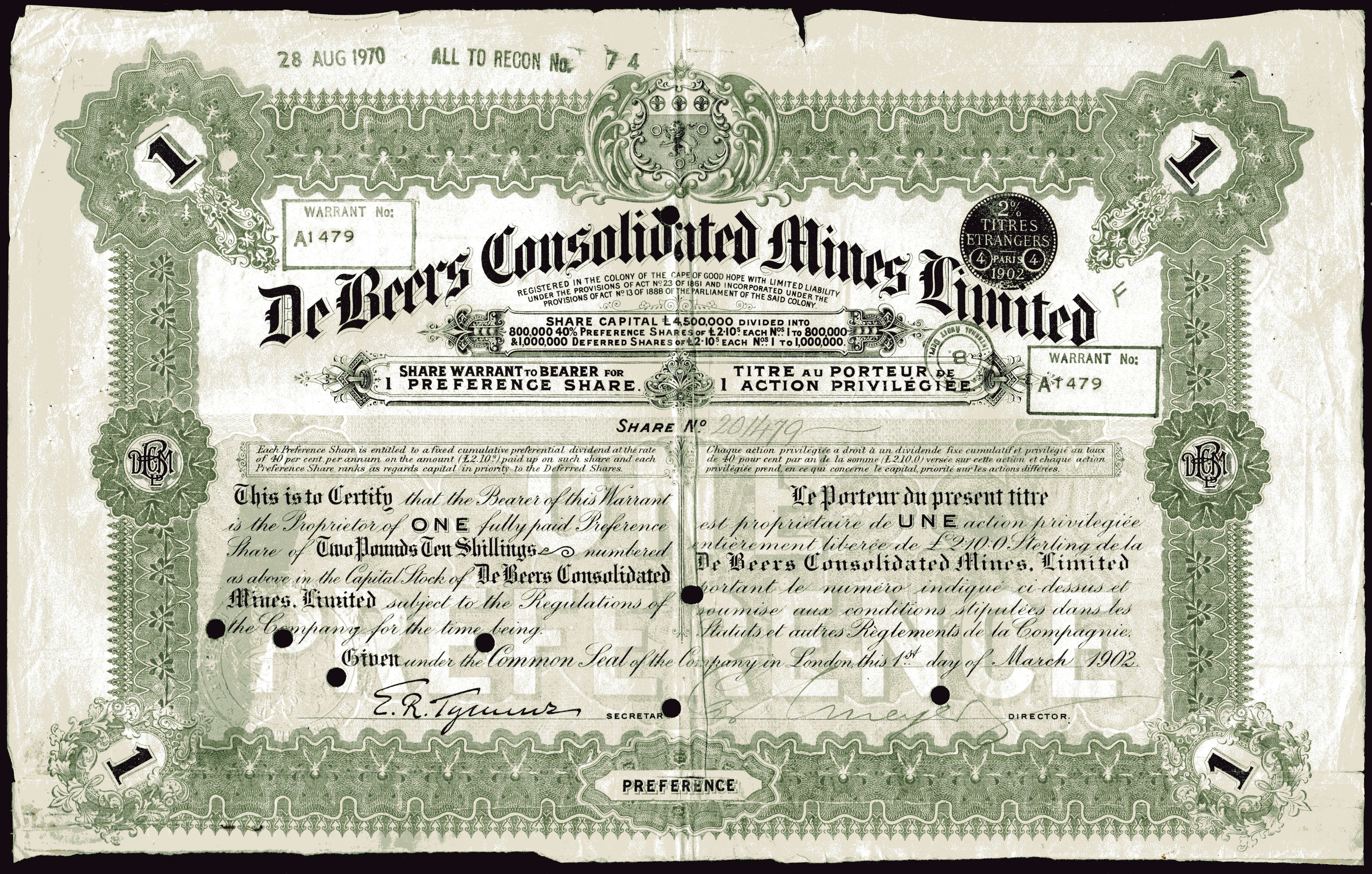
Preference share of the De Beers Consolidated Mines Ltd., issued 1 March 1902

The name 'De Beers' was derived from two Afrikaner settlers: brothers Diederik Arnoldus de Beer (1825–1878) and Johannes Nicolaas de Beer (1830–1883), who owned a farm named Vooruitzicht (Dutch for "prospect" or "outlook") near Zandfontein in the Boshof District of the Orange Free State. Diederik and Johannes were direct descendants of the VOC soldier and later farmer, Matthys Andries de Beer, of Vaasa, Finland, who had migrated to South Africa in 1699 via Lübeck. Following the discovery of diamonds on Diederik and Johannes's land, the increasing demands of the British government forced them to sell their farm on 31 July 1871 to merchant Alfred Johnson Ebden (1820–1908) for £6,600. Vooruitzicht would become the site of the Big Hole and the De Beers mine, two successful diamond mines. Their name, which was given to one of the mines, subsequently became associated with the company.

Cecil Rhodes, the founder of the British South Africa Company, got his start by renting water pumps to miners during the diamond rush that started in 1869, when an 83.5 carat diamond called the 'Star of South Africa' was found at Hopetown near the Orange River in South Africa. He invested the profits of this operation into buying up claims of small mining operators, with his operations soon expanding into a separate mining company. He soon secured funding from the Rothschild family, who financed his business expansion. De Beers Consolidated Mines was formed in 1888 by the merger of the companies of diamond magnate Barney Barnato and Cecil Rhodes. By this time, the company was the sole owner of all diamond mining operations in South Africa.

In 1889, Rhodes negotiated a strategic agreement with the London-based Diamond Syndicate, which agreed to purchase a fixed quantity of diamonds at an agreed price, thereby regulating output and maintaining prices. The agreement soon proved to be very successful – for example, during the trade slump of 1891–1892, supply was curtailed to maintain the price. Rhodes was concerned about the break-up of the new monopoly, stating to shareholders in 1896 that the company's "only risk is the sudden discovery of new mines, which human nature will work recklessly to the detriment of us all".

The Second Boer War proved to be a challenging time for the company. Kimberley was besieged as soon as war broke out, thereby threatening the company's valuable mines. Rhodes personally moved into the city at the onset of the siege to put political pressure on the British government to divert military resources towards relieving the siege rather than more strategic war objectives. Despite being at odds with the military, Rhodes placed the full resources of the company at the disposal of the defenders, manufacturing shells, defences, an armoured train and a gun named Long Cecil in the company workshops.

=== Oppenheimer control ===
In 1898, diamonds were discovered on farms near Pretoria, Transvaal. One led to the discovery of the Premier Mine. The Premier Mine was registered in 1902 and the Cullinan Diamond, the largest rough diamond ever discovered, was found there in 1905. (The Premier Mine was renamed the Cullinan Mine in 2003.) Its Thomas Cullinan refused to join the De Beers cartel. Instead, the mine started selling to a pair of independent dealers named Bernard and Ernest Oppenheimer, thereby weakening the De Beers stranglehold. Francis Oats, who became Chairman of De Beers in 1908, was dismissive of the threats from the Premier Mine and the finds in German South West Africa. However, production soon equalled all of the De Beers mines combined. Ernest Oppenheimer was appointed the local agent for the powerful London Syndicate, rising to the position of mayor of Kimberley within 10 years. He understood the core principle that underpinned De Beers's success, stating in 1910 that "common sense tells us that the only way to increase the value of diamonds is to make them scarce, that is to reduce production".

During World War I, the Premier Mine was finally absorbed into De Beers. When Rhodes died in 1902, De Beers controlled 90% of the world's diamond production. Ernest Oppenheimer took over the chairmanship of the company in 1929, after buying shares and being appointed to the board in 1926. Oppenheimer was very concerned about the discovery of diamonds in 1908 in German South West Africa, fearing that the increased supply would swamp the market and force prices down. Former CIA chief Admiral Stansfield Turner claimed that De Beers restricted US access to industrial diamonds needed for the country's war effort during World War II.

During the early 1930s, the company conducted experimental work which in large part pioneered the use of diamond drills. This was highly preferable to more expensive and rarer carbons previously in use. The Free State Gold Rush was made possible in part due to this innovation, as the fields required deep drilling to reach gold-bearing reefs.

In May 1955, Ernest Oppenheimer opened a new headquarters which combined the operations of Anglo American and the De Beers group. After Ernest died in November 1957, operation of Anglo and De Beers was passed on to his son, Harry Oppenheimer. Under Harry, the company expanded to several different countries, including Canada, Australia, Malaysia, Portugal, Zambia, and Tanzania. In South Africa, Harry opposed apartheid, arguing that it hindered economic growth. Despite this, De Beers has been criticized for profiting from the system during the apartheid period. By 1973, Anglo and De Beers accounted for 10 percent of South Africa's gross national product and 30 percent of the country's exports.

Throughout the 1960s and 1970s, De Beers attempted to secretly enter the United States' diamond market, being forced to divest its American assets in 1975 to avoid the risk of violating anti-trust laws. Harry Oppenheimer stepped down as the chairman and director of Anglo-American and De Beers in December 1982.

=== 21st-century changes ===
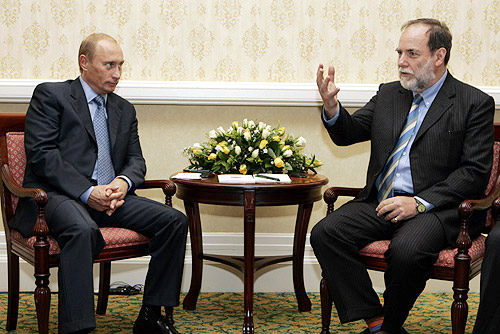
Russian president Vladimir Putin meeting former De Beers chairman Nicky Oppenheimer in South Africa in 2006

During the 20th century, De Beers used several methods to leverage its dominant position to manipulate price and demand in the international diamond market. First, it attempted to convince independent producers to join its single channel monopoly. When that did not work, it flooded the market with diamonds similar to those of producers who refused to join in, depressing their price and undermining return for the resistant. It also purchased and stockpiled diamonds produced by other manufacturers as well as surplus diamonds in order to control prices by limiting supply. Finally, it bought diamonds when prices fell considerably naturally, to constrict supply and drive their value back up, such as during the Great Depression.

In 2000, the De Beers business model changed because of factors such as the decision by producers in Canada and Australia to distribute diamonds outside the De Beers channel, as well as increasingly negative publicity surrounding blood diamonds, which forced De Beers to protect its image by limiting sales to its own mined products.

The combination of a more fragmented and thus more competitive diamond market, increased transparency, and greater liquidity caused De Beers's market share of rough diamonds to fall from as high as 90% in the 1980s to 29.5% in 2019.

Seeing these developing trends, the Oppenheimer family announced in November 2011 its intention to sell its entire 40% stake in De Beers to Anglo American plc, thereby increasing Anglo American's ownership of the company to 85% (with the remaining 15% owned by the Government of the Republic of Botswana). The transaction was worth £3.2 billion (US$5.1 billion) in cash and ended the Oppenheimer dynasty's 80-year ownership of De Beers.

De Beers sold Kimberley Mines to Petra Diamonds and Ekapa Mining in 2016 for $7.2 million. Petra had purchased De Beers' underground mines at Kimberley previously.

From 2016 to 2024, the De Beers Company has released a series of "Modern Slavery Statements" to comply with Section 54 of the United Kingdom's 2015 Modern Slavery Act.

In May 2024, Anglo American announced its intention to spin off or sell De Beers. Botswana and Angola proposed buying a majority stake in September 2025.

In 2025, De Beers reported holding an inventory of unsold mined diamonds valued at approximately US$2 billion. The company attributed this to a decline in demand for natural diamonds, driven in part by the growing popularity of lab-grown diamonds, which have become significantly more affordable. By 2025, lab-grown diamonds were reported to be approximately 90% less expensive than their mined counterparts, compared to a 10% price difference in 2018.

=== Marketing ===
De Beers successfully advertised diamonds to stimulate consumer demand. One of the most effective marketing strategies has been the marketing of diamonds as a symbol of love and commitment. Copywriter Frances Gerety (1916–1999) working for N. W. Ayer & Son coined the famous advertising slogan, 'A Diamond is Forever', in 1947. In 2000, Advertising Age magazine named 'A Diamond is Forever' the best advertising slogan of the 20th century. The slogan likely inspired the name of Ian Fleming's fourth book about fictional agent James Bond, as well as the related film and song all titled Diamonds Are Forever.

Other successful campaigns include the 'eternity ring' (meant as a symbol of continuing affection and appreciation), the 'trilogy ring' (meant to represent the past, present, and future of a relationship) and the 'right hand ring' (meant to be bought and worn by women as a symbol of independence).

De Beers ran television advertisements featuring silhouettes of people wearing diamonds, set to the music of Palladio by Karl Jenkins. The campaign, titled "Shadows and Lights", first ran in the first quarter of 1993. The song would later inspire a compilation album, Diamond Music, released in 1996, which features the Palladio suite. A 2010 commercial for Verizon Wireless parodied the De Beers spots.

In May 2018, De Beers introduced a new brand of jewelry called "Lightbox" made with synthetic diamonds in partnership with Element Six. The synthetic stones started at $200 for a quarter-carat to $800 for a full-carat diamond, about one-tenth the cost of naturally occurring diamonds. The new brand began selling in September 2018, and the stones are produced in Gresham, Oregon, a $94 million facility using the region's cheap electricity, which opened in 2018 with a capacity for 500,000 rough carats of diamonds per year. With prices of lab-grown diamonds continuing to fall, De Beers announced the discontinuation of the Lightbox brand in May 2025, positioning itself in the luxury Veblen good space of mined diamonds.

== Operations ==
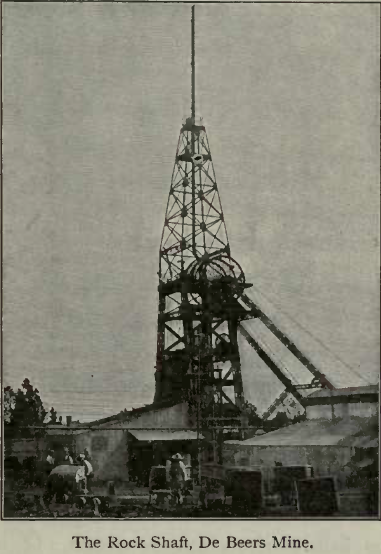
De Beers Mine shaft

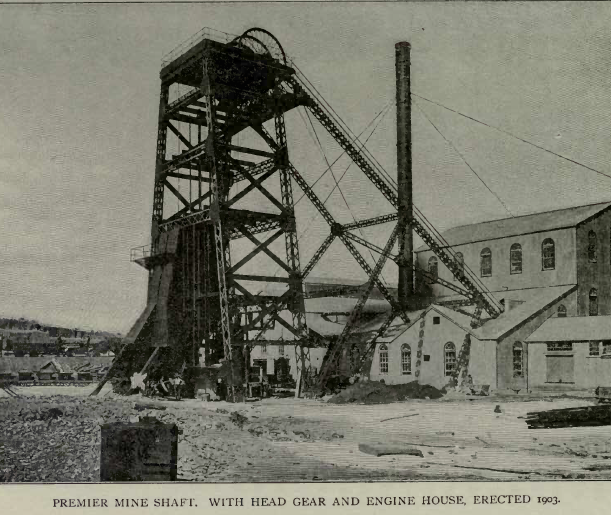
Premier Mine shaft

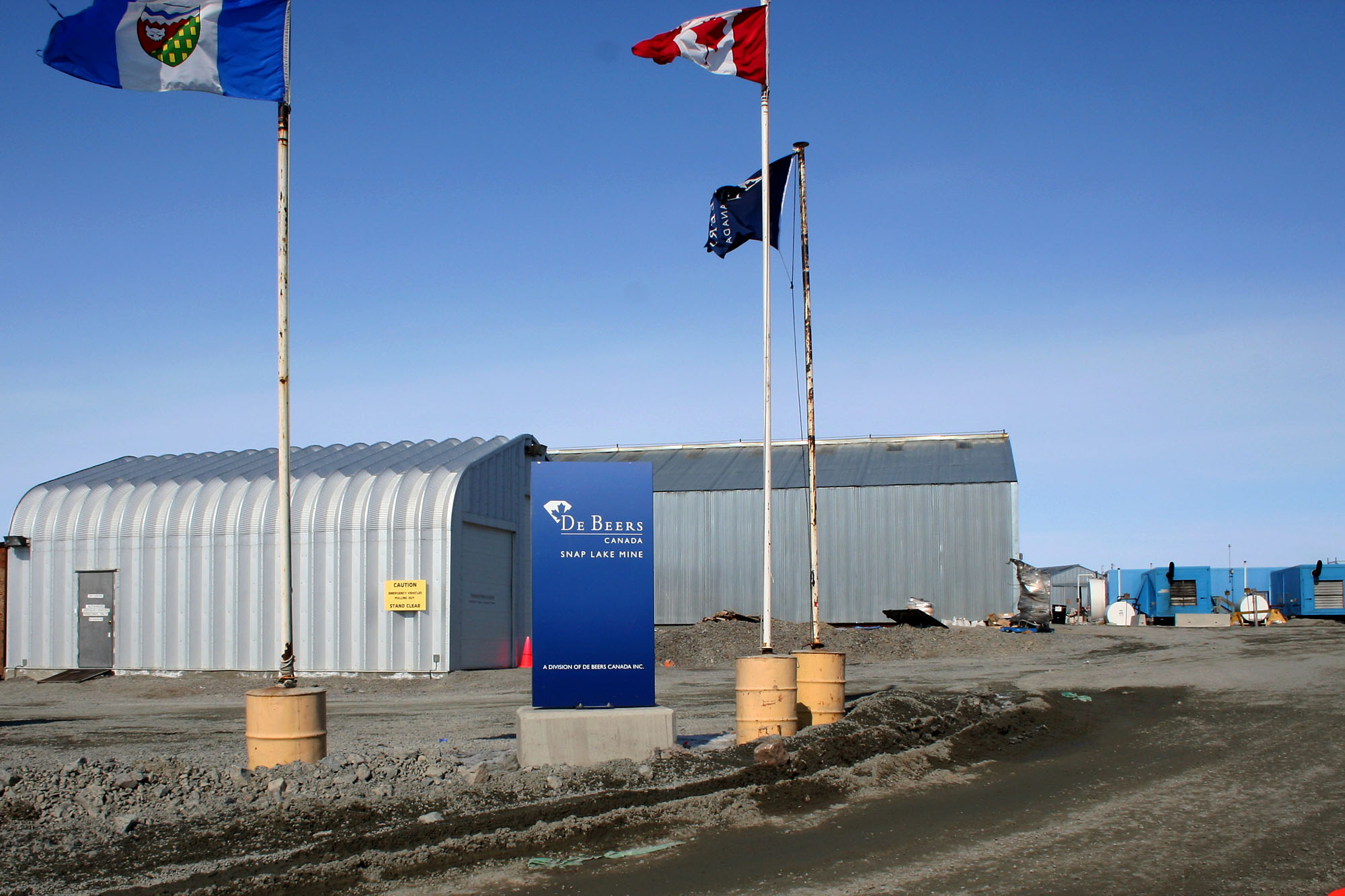
The De Beers Snap Lake Mine in Canada

Mining in Botswana takes place through the mining company Debswana, a 50–50 joint venture with the Government of the Republic of Botswana. It operates four mines – Jwaneng, Orapa, Letlhakane and Damtshaa, though Damtshaa was put on care and maintenance in 2015.

In Namibia, mining is carried out through Namdeb Holdings, a 50–50 joint venture with the Government of the Republic of Namibia. Namdeb Holdings is made up of Debmarine Namibia (covering offshore mining) and Namdeb Diamond Corporation (land-based coastal mining). For offshore mining, motor vessels are used, including the 12,000-tonne, 113-metre-long SS Nujoma, built at a cost of $157 million and named after Sam Nujoma, Namibia's founding president. This vessel, the world's most advanced diamond exploration and sampling vessel, began full operations in June 2017. The Benguela Gem began operation in 2022. At 177 meters it's the world's largest diamond vessel and cost De Beers $486 million to build.

De Beers Consolidated Mines is responsible for the De Beers mining in South Africa. It is 74% owned by De Beers and 26% by a South African Black Economic Empowerment company, Ponahalo Investment Holdings. De Beers shut down production at the Voorspoed mine in 2018 as it reached the end of life, and the Venetia mine remains operational as of 2026.

In 2008, De Beers began production at the Snap Lake mine in the Northwest Territories, Canada; this was the first De Beers mine outside Africa and was Canada's first completely underground diamond mine. Production was suspended, the company attempted to find a buyer, and ultimately shut the mine in 2015 and let it flood in 2017. It was never profitable. De Beers opened the Victor mine in Ontario, Canada, the same year, a day after Snap Lake, and closed it in 2019 as projected. Reclamation work was completed in 2023. This was followed by the opening of the company's third mine in Canada, Gahcho Kue, in September 2016. It is a joint venture with Mountain Province Diamonds.

Trading of rough diamonds takes place through two channels – De Beers Global Sightholder Sales (GSS) and De Beers Auction Sales. GSS sells about 90% of De Beers's rough diamonds, by value, and features wholly owned and joint venture operations in South Africa (De Beers Sightholder Sales South Africa), Botswana (DTCB), and Namibia (NDTC). They sort, value and sell 33% (2013) of the world's rough diamonds by value.

There are two main types of customers for rough diamonds – Sightholders and Accredited Buyers. Sightholders have a term contract. Accredited Buyer status, introduced in 2015, allows companies that are not traditional Sightholders to access diamonds that were not allocated to existing Sightholders. De Beers also sells about 10% of its rough diamonds through online auction sales. The company pioneered the approach in 2008 when it broke with 44 years of direct sales to hold the diamond industry's first online international auction sale. It is now the world's leader in this kind of auction sale.

As of 2023, De Beers employed approximately 20,000 people.

In February 2020, De Beers reported its worst set of earnings since the company was bought by miner Anglo American in 2012.

=== Business structure and brands ===
On 4 November 2011, Anglo American plc and CHL Holdings announced their agreement for Anglo American to acquire an incremental interest in De Beers, increasing Anglo American's 45% shareholding in the world's leading diamond company to 85%. De Beers plc was originally incorporated as De Beers Société Anonyme in 2000 in Luxembourg. Following the closure of this office, the company was reclassified as De Beers plc in 2017, with its head office now in Jersey. It is made up of two shareholdings: Anglo American plc has an 85% shareholding and the Government of the Republic of Botswana owns 15% directly. De Beers plc is the holding company of The De Beers Group of Companies. It is involved in many parts of the diamond value chain, from mining to sales, and is made up of a series of joint ventures and wholly owned operations.

The joint ventures are:

- Debmarine Namibia
- Debswana
- DTCB
- Namdeb
- NDTC

The wholly owned operations are in southern Africa and Canada. Also wholly owned are Forevermark, De Beers Jewellers, the International Institute of Diamond Valuation, De Beers Ventures, the International Institute of Diamond Grading & Research and Element Six (Umicore has a 40% stake in Element Six's abrasives division).

==== Forevermark ====
Forevermark was launched in 2008 as one of the two diamond brands from The De Beers Group of Companies. According to the company website, "Each Forevermark diamond is inscribed with a promise: that it is beautiful, rare and responsibly sourced." Forevermark diamonds are inscribed with an icon and unique identification number, albeit invisibly to the naked eye: the Forevermark inscription is 1/20th of a micron deep. This inscription helps distinguish Forevermark diamonds from other natural diamonds though, similarly to when distinguishing natural diamonds from synthetic diamonds, it requires specialist detection equipment to view. The inscription also helps maintain scarcity: the Forevermark website boasts that only a tiny percentage of diamonds qualify for the Forevermark brand.

==== De Beers London ====
De Beers Diamond Jewellers (DBDJ) was established in 2001 as a 50:50 joint venture between The De Beers Group of Companies and LVMH, the French luxury goods company. The first De Beers boutique opened in 2002 on London's Old Bond Street as the brand's flagship store. Since then, stores have opened in various cities around the world. In March 2017, The De Beers Group of Companies acquired LVMH's 50% shareholding in DBDJ and new name De Beers Jewellers was unveiled.

In 2025, De Beers Jewellers was rebranded as De Beers London.

De Beers Industry Services

In 2008, De Beers founded The International Institute of Diamond Grading & Research (IIDGR), now known as the De Beers Industry Services. De Beers Industry Services provides grading and verification services for diamonds. De Beers Industry Services also includes the subgroup, the Institute of Diamonds which provides education courses. The Institute of Diamonds has campuses in the United Kingdom, Belgium and India.

==== ORIGIN - De Beers Group ====
Origin - De Beers Group is the group's branded polished diamond offering available at participating non-De Beers branded retailers.

=== Blood diamonds and the Kimberley Process ===
In 1999, a campaign by Global Witness to highlight the role of diamonds in international conflicts led to a review by the United Nations. The initial focus of the UN's investigation was on Jonas Savimbi's UNITA movement in Angola, which was found to have bartered uncut diamonds for weaponry despite international economic and diplomatic sanctions being in effect through United Nations Security Council Resolution 1173.

In 1999, De Beers Group stopped all outside buying of diamonds in order to guarantee the conflict-free status of their diamonds effective from 26 March 2000.

In December 2000, following the recommendations of the Fowler Report, the UN adopted the landmark General Assembly Resolution A/RES/55/56 supporting the creation of an international certification scheme for rough diamonds. By November 2002, negotiations between governments, the international diamond industry, led by De Beers, and civil society organisations resulted in the creation of the Kimberley Process Certification Scheme (KPCS), which sets out the requirements for controlling rough diamond production and trade and became effective in 2003.

De Beers states that 100% of the diamonds it now sells are conflict-free and that all De Beers diamonds are purchased in compliance with national law, the Kimberley Process Certification Scheme and its own Diamond Best Practice Principles. The Kimberley process has helped restore the reputation of the industry, as well as eliminating sources of excess supply.

In 2018, De Beers used blockchain technology to successfully track 100 high-value diamonds. The diamonds were tracked through the manufacturing process from the mine to the retailer in order to ensure their quality and conflict-free status.

In 2019, they launched their own end-to-end traceability platform called Tracr to enable all diamonds to be identified and traced as they move from the mine to the store. Signet and the Russian-based Alrosa are using the technology.

== Corporate affairs ==
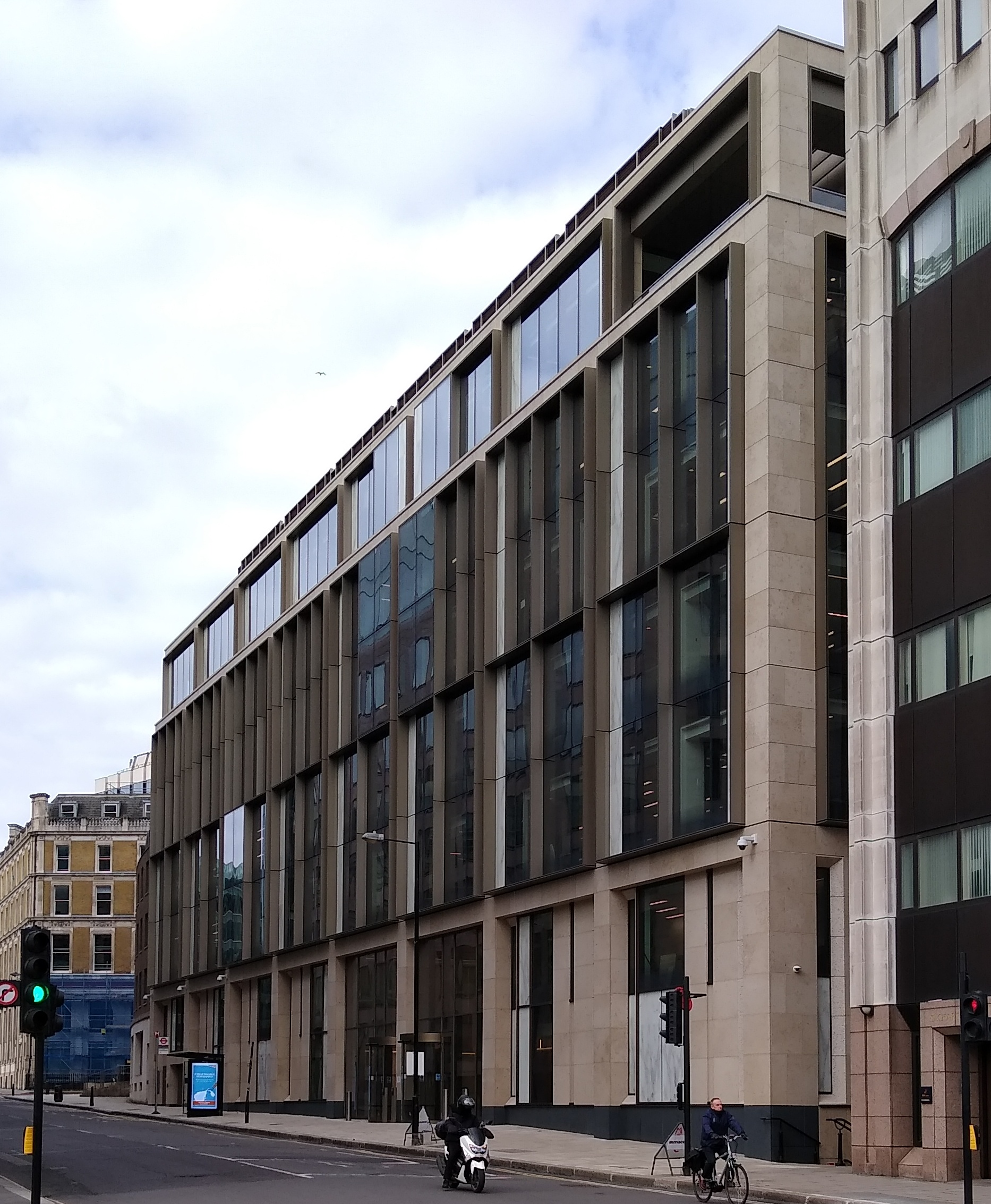
Headquarters at 17 Charterhouse Street, London

In August 2017, De Beers partnered with the Stanford Graduate School of Business to accelerate business ventures to market in Botswana, Namibia, and South Africa. As part of two programs, the partnership is set to help teach early entrepreneurs how to commercialize their business ideas. The partnership is a three-year, $3 million deal.

In September 2017, De Beers partnered with UN Women to help the advancement of women within the company and the countries it operates in. In 2018, the two entities launched a program to support 500 women micro-entrepreneurs in Blouberg and Musina communities, near De Beers's Venetia diamond mine.

== Former operations ==
International Institute of Diamond Valuation The International Institute of Diamond Valuation (IIDV) was launched by De Beers Group in March 2016. Operating in partnership with diamond jewellery retailers, it provided a reselling service for all diamonds, regardless of value. In April 2019, De Beers closed its IIDV division.

De Beers Ventures De Beers Ventures was established by De Beers Group in June 2017 to consider minority stake investments in start-ups and growth companies that could be of benefit to De Beers Group or the broader diamond sector. It has since been dispanded.

== Legal issues ==
=== Sherman Antitrust Act ===
During World War II, Ernest Oppenheimer attempted to negotiate a way around the Sherman Antitrust Act by proposing that De Beers register a US branch of the Diamond Syndicate Incorporated. In this way, his company could provide the US with the industrial diamonds it desperately sought for the war effort in return for immunity from prosecution after the war; however, his proposal was rejected by the US Justice Department when it was discovered that De Beers had no intention of stockpiling any industrial diamonds in the US. In 1945, the Justice Department finally filed an antitrust case against De Beers, but the case was dismissed as the company had no presence on US soil.

=== Relocation of Indigenous San people in Botswana ===
As of 2024, De Beers owns and operates, solely or jointly, five diamond mines in Botswana. A long dispute has existed between the interests of De Beers and the San (Bushman) tribe. The San have been facing threats of forcible relocation since the 1980s, when the diamond resources were discovered. A campaign was fought in an attempt to bring an end to what the indigenous rights organisation, Survival International, considers to be a genocide of a tribe that has been living in those lands for tens of thousands of years. Several international fashion models, including Iman, Lily Cole and Erin O'Connor, who were previously involved with advertising for the company's diamonds, supported the campaign. De Beers sold one mine in Botswana to Gem Diamonds in 2007.

=== Industrial diamonds ===
In 2004, De Beers pled guilty and paid a US$10 million fine to the United States Department of Justice to settle a 1994 charge that De Beers had colluded with General Electric to fix the price of industrial diamonds. In 2008, De Beers agreed to pay a US$295 million class-action settlement after accusations of price fixing. The company appealed against the decision but ended up paying the settlement in 2013.

=== European Commission ===
In February 2006, De Beers entered into legally binding commitments with the European Commission to cease purchasing rough diamonds from Russian mining company Alrosa as of the end of 2008 in order to ensure competition between the two companies.

=== South Africa's rough diamond trade ===
In 2014, the Leverhulme Centre for the Study of Value, based at the University of Manchester, published a report authored by Sarah Bracking and Khadija Sharife, identifying over US$3.3 billion in price fixing within the South African rough diamond trade from 2004 to 2012, leading to an estimated deficit in tax paid of ZAR 1 billion per year. The report found significant evidence of profit shifting through volume and value manipulation. Sharife simultaneously published an article disclosing the political system that cultivated revenue leakage, including the donation of De Beers staff to the State Diamond Trader (SDT). The report, like the article, utilised aggregated data produced by the Kimberley Process (KP) certificates of import-exports, relying on figures listed by the diamond companies themselves, in which De Beers was the dominant player. The South African Department of Mineral Resources (DMR) disclosed that De Beers did not authorise them to publish figures involving values, sales, pricing and other data, preventing transparency of the industry.

== See also ==
- Canadian diamonds
- De Beers Diamond Oval
- Julian Ogilvie Thompson
- List of diamonds
- List of synthetic diamond manufacturers
- Peace in Africa (ship), diamond mining dredge
- The Case of the Disappearing Diamonds (TV documentary)
