= Highways in Nunavut =

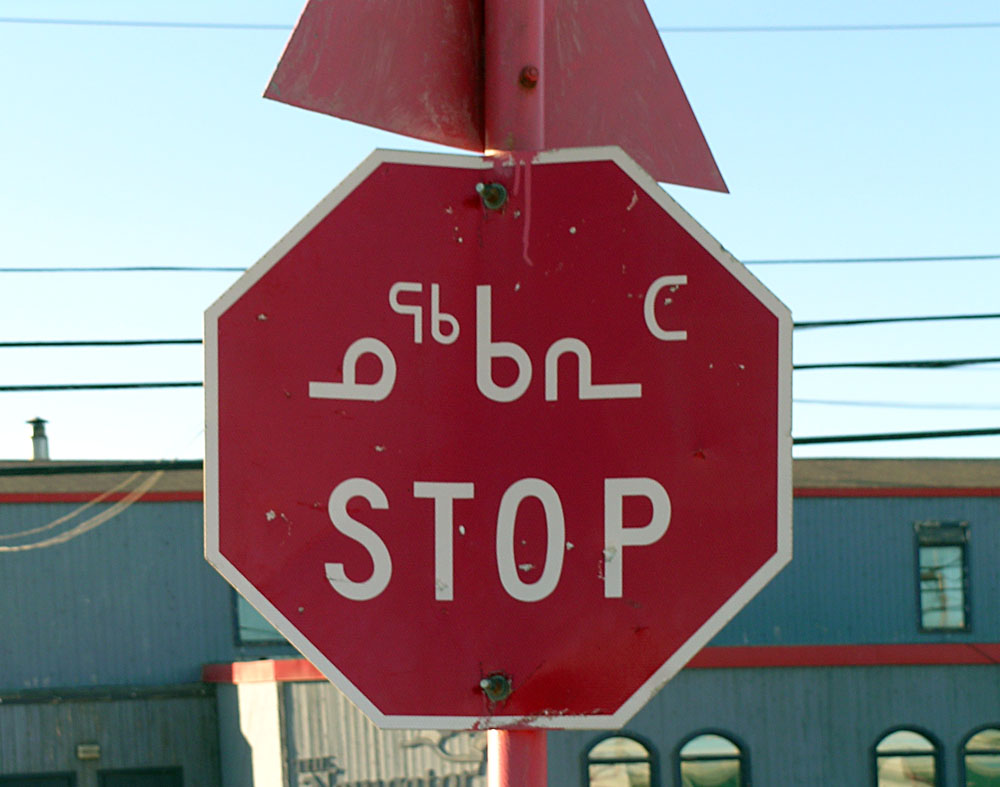
A stop sign in Inuktitut syllabics, seen in Iqaluit, 1999

Highways in Nunavut comprise an estimated 850 km (530 mi) of roads and highways across the Canadian territory of Nunavut. Nunavut has been without a seasonal road connection to the rest of Canada since 2008, when the Tibbitt to Contwoyto Winter Road, which had extended from Yellowknife in the Northwest Territories to the Jericho Diamond Mine on Contwoyto Lake in Nunavut, ceased serving the mine. The winter road was shortened in 2009 following the mine's closure and no longer extended across the Northwest Territories–Nunavut border.

Most vehicles in the territory are transported between communities and into and out of Nunavut by large barges operating during the summer shipping season. Less commonly, vehicles may be flown in on cargo aircraft. Automobile manufacturers also occasionally fly vehicles into the territory to test them under Arctic conditions.

Nunavut has no numbered territorial highway system; its roads are generally identified by their names or the communities and destinations they connect. Street signs are in English and Inuktut (Inuktitut and Inuinnaqtun), depending on the location.

Compared with the rest of Canada, maintaining a vehicle in Nunavut is expensive. Rough roads and harsh weather conditions contribute to high vehicle maintenance costs. Despite government subsidies, fuel prices are among the highest in Canada. Vehicle parts can be expensive and take considerable time to arrive, while mechanics often charge higher rates because relatively few operate in the territory. In the absence of a connected road network between communities, aircraft remain the preferred means of intercommunity travel. Other common forms of transportation include all-terrain vehicles (ATVs) throughout much of the year, snowmobiles during winter, and boats during summer. Travel by dog sled has largely disappeared, although recreational dog-sledding remains common.

Approximately 4,000 vehicles are registered in the territory. A variety of makes and models can be found in Nunavut, although heavy-duty four-wheel-drive vehicles, including sport utility vehicles, Jeeps and full-size vans, are particularly common. Iqaluit has a wider variety of vehicles than many other communities, reflecting its role as the territorial capital and the location of much of the territorial government's operations. Its road network includes paved and chip-sealed sections, although much of it remains unpaved.

== Important roads and highways in Nunavut ==
=== Tibbitt to Contwoyto Winter Road ===
The private Tibbitt to Contwoyto Winter Road was once a way for trucks to drive to Nunavut from Yellowknife. The private winter road services a number of mines and worker lodgings in the region. The entire road is 605 km (376 mi) and is the world's longest heavy haul ice road. It is open between February and March each year. Since the closure of the Lupin Mine and the Jericho Diamond Mine, only the first 400 km (250 mi)of the Tibbitt to Contwoyto Winter Road have been constructed each winter. The road does not cross into Nunavut any longer. The public may drive on the first few kilometers of the winter road, but must turn around at a security checkpoint. The road ends at the Ekati Diamond Mine in the Northwest Territories.

=== Arctic Bay to Nanisivik Highway ===
This 21 km (13 mi) stretch of highway connects the town of Arctic Bay to the former mining town of Nanisivik. The road also gained world fame for a number of years when it was used for the Midnight Sun Marathon run but has become less important when the mine shut down in 2002. The mine was later contaminated with lead. However, it should benefit from the Canadian Armed Forces planned $100 million expansion of the Nanisivik Naval Facility, the deep water port, and Nanisivik Airport, announced on August 10, 2007, by Prime Minister Stephen Harper.

=== Eureka Highway ===
This is a 20 km (12 mi) all-weather highway that provides the link from Eureka Weather Station to Eureka and the Eureka Aerodrome.

=== Federal Road, Iqaluit ===
The main road in Iqaluit, this road provides access from the airport to the centre of the city and to the Legislative Building of Nunavut.

=== Niaqunngusiariaq Road, Iqaluit ===
This road provides access from Iqaluit to the original community of Apex (Niaqunguut). The road was built by the United States Army Corps of Engineers in order to keep their soldiers busy while they waited for the sea ice to open up to let them go home in the summer of 1956.

The bridge across Kujesse (Apex Creek) was a gift from the Government of Ontario's Department of Highways the following year.

The inaugural trip down Apex Hill led to a truckload of soldiers in the ditch. The brakes on the army vehicle had not been tested for several years in the "flats" of what was then Frobisher Bay, and they did not hold when tested on the new road. Only pride was injured when the truck hit the ditch on its first trip.

Prior to the road being built, schoolchildren living near the base at "Ikaluit" walked to Federal Day School in Apex over the sea ice or stayed with relatives in Apex, as CFS Frobisher Bay was "off limits" to Inuit.

Today, this road has been developed along much of its 5 km (3.1 mi) length. It is now one of the busiest roads in the territory, a typical rush hour sustains 500 cars an hour, although rush hour itself is locally called the "rush minute".

=== Alert to Alert Airport Road ===
This roughly 6 km (3.7 mi) stretch of all-weather road is the most northern stretch of road in the world. This road provides access from Canadian Forces Station Alert to the Alert Airport.

=== Ovayok Road ===
This road runs from Cambridge Bay eastward 17 km (11 mi) to Ovayok Territorial Park (Mount Pelly). Another road runs west, past the Cambridge Bay Airport, approximately 14 km (8.7 mi) from the hamlet.

=== Coral Harbour Airport Road ===
This road connects the hamlet of Coral Harbour on Southampton Island with its airport, 11 km (6.8 mi) away.

== Road to Aqiarungna ==
This road, currently under construction, connects the community of Coral Harbour to Duke of York Bay 175 km (109 mi). Construction started in 1999 and is expected to be completed in 2027. The Government of Nunavut has contributed $2.74 million on the road to date.

== Proposed roads and highways ==
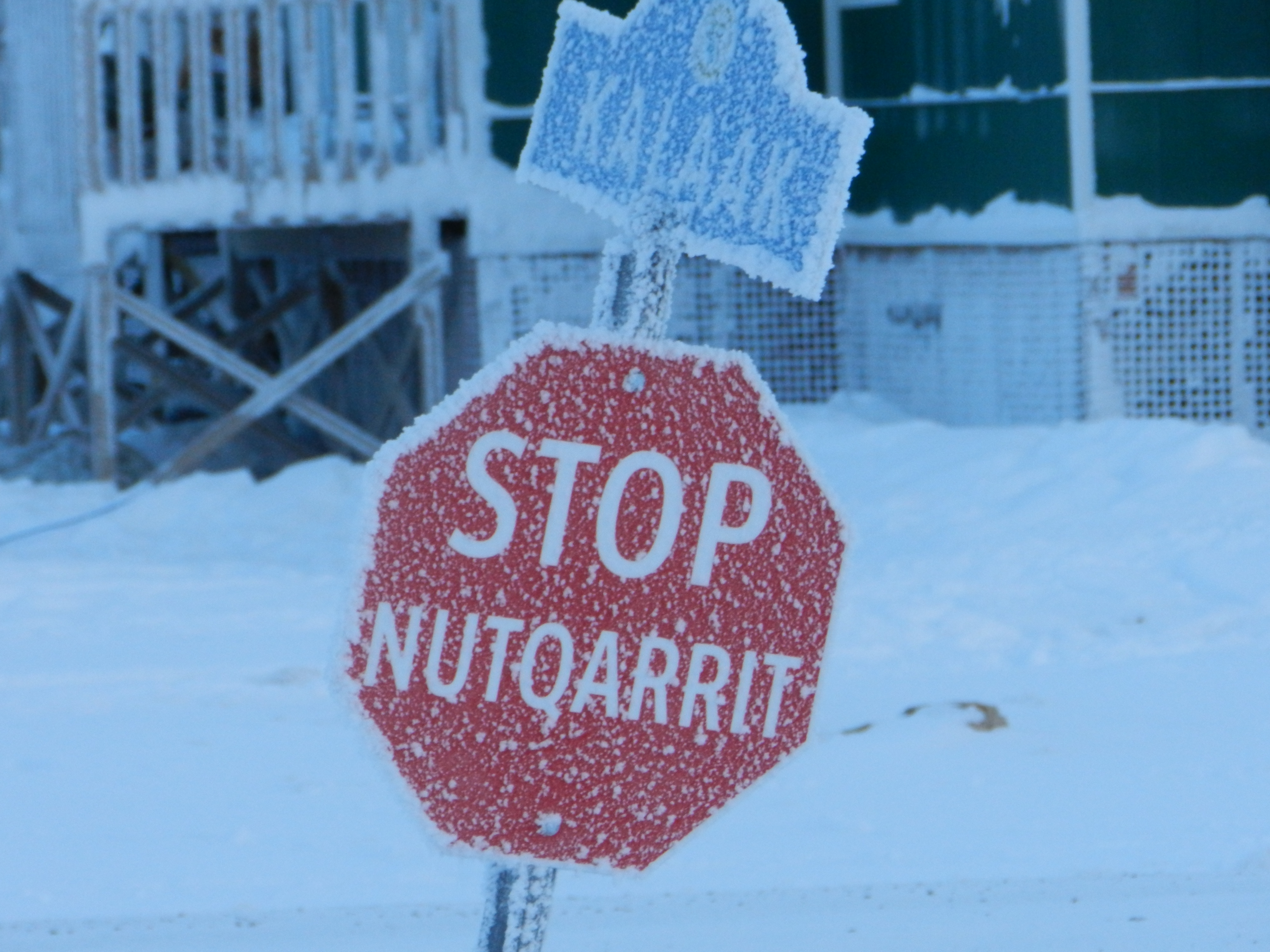
A stop sign (nutqarrit) in Inuinnaqtun and English in Cambridge Bay

A road link between Manitoba and Nunavut was once planned. This road would cost an estimated $1.2 billion to build and another $3 million a year to maintain. This road is expected to run 1,100 km (680 mi) from Sundance, Manitoba to Rankin Inlet, Nunavut. However, a study showed that the cost of building the road would likely far outweigh any potential economic benefits. A proposal was also in place for a highway to Rankin Inlet, Nunavut from Gillam, Manitoba with a connection to Churchill, Manitoba, a route that was chosen over two other alternatives from Thompson and Lynn Lake.

A road was briefly considered in 2003 for construction between Iqaluit and Kimmirut (formerly known as Lake Harbour), but it would be four times longer than the direct air-distance between the communities, and the idea was dropped.

In 2016, the federal government approved $64 million in funding to build a deep sea port in Iqaluit, that was expected to be completed by 2020. It would be used to cut costs for goods that would otherwise have to be flown in, and was also envisioned to allow a vehicle ferry service to Happy Valley-Goose Bay in Newfoundland and Labrador. In 2019, it was announced that the port would not include the facilities necessary for the ferry service, as they would have been too expensive. It was finally opened in July 2023.

In March 2026, prime minister Mark Carney announced plans for a Grays Bay Road, referring it the Major Projects Office. This proposed 230-kilometer road would link the Jericho Diamond Mine to a proposed deep-water port in Grays Bay. Construction of the road and port is targeted to begin in 2029 and would take five years to build, at a cost of 1.2 billion dollars. A 400-kilometer road between Yellowknife and the Jericho Mine was also proposed.
