= Qikiqtaaluk Region =

Region of Nunavut, Canada

Coordinates: 70°N 080°W

Qikiqtaaluk ᕿᑭᖅᑖᓗᒃ (Inuktitut) Qikiqtani Baffin
- Region
- Qikiqtaaluk Region
- Communities of the Qikiqtaaluk

- Location in Nunavut
- Country: Canada
- Territory: Nunavut
- Regional centre: Iqaluit

Area
  - Total: 970,554.61 km^{2} (374,733.23 sq mi)

Population
  - Total: 19,355
  - Density: 0.019942/km^{2} (0.051650/sq mi)

The Qikiqtaaluk Region (Inuktitut: ᕿᑭᖅᑖᓗᒃ, pronounced [qikiqtaːˈluk]), Qikiqtani Region or Baffin Region is the easternmost, northernmost, and southernmost administrative region of Nunavut, Canada. Qikiqtaaluk is the traditional Inuktitut name for Baffin Island. Although the Qikiqtaaluk Region is the most commonly used name in official contexts, several notable public organizations, including Statistics Canada prior to the 2021 Canadian census, use the older term Baffin Region.

With a population of 19,355 and an area of 970,554.61 km^{2} (374,733.23 sq mi), slightly smaller than Egypt, it is the largest and most populated of the three regions. It is also the largest second-level administrative division in the world.

The region consists of Baffin Island, the Belcher Islands, Akimiski Island, Mansel Island, Prince Charles Island, Bylot Island, Devon Island, Baillie-Hamilton Island, Cornwallis Island, Bathurst Island, Amund Ringnes Island, Ellef Ringnes Island, Axel Heiberg Island, Ellesmere Island, the Melville Peninsula, the eastern part of Melville Island, and the northern parts of both Prince of Wales Island and Somerset Island, plus smaller islands in between. The regional centre, and territorial capital, is Iqaluit (population 7,429). The Qikiqtaaluk Region spans the northernmost, easternmost, and southernmost areas of Nunavut.

Before 1999, the Qikiqtaaluk Region existed under slightly different boundaries in the Northwest Territories as the Baffin Region, in the northern part of the District of Keewatin.

The western half of the nearby Hans Island is part of the Qikiqtaaluk, while the eastern half is part of Greenland and is in the municipality of Avannaata.

== Communities ==
All of Qikiqtaaluk's thirteen communities are located on tidal water and just under half of its residents live in Nunavut's capital and only city, Iqaluit (7,429.). The majority of the rest live in twelve hamlets—Arctic Bay (994), Kinngait (1,396), Clyde River (1,181), Grise Fiord (144), Sanirajak (891), Igloolik (2,049), Kimmirut (426), Pangnirtung (1,504), Pond Inlet (1,555), Qikiqtarjuaq (593), Resolute (183) and Sanikiluaq (1,010). Alert (CFS Alert) and Eureka are part of Qikiqtaaluk, Unorganized (permanent population 0) areas in the Qikiqtaaluk.

Formerly, there was a mining town at Nanisivik. However, it and the Nanisivik Mine closed in 2002, with Nanisivik Airport closing in 2010 and all flights transferred to Arctic Bay Airport.

Like the majority of Canada's Inuit communities, the region's traditional foods include seal, Arctic char, walrus, polar bear, and caribou.

Inhabitants of the Qikiqtaaluk Region are called Qikiqtaalungmiut.

== Iqaluit ==
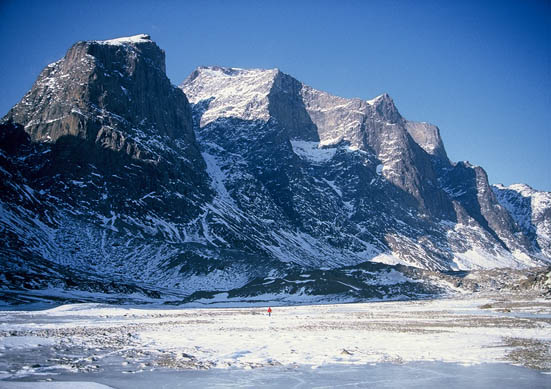
Mount Odin, Auyuittuq National Park

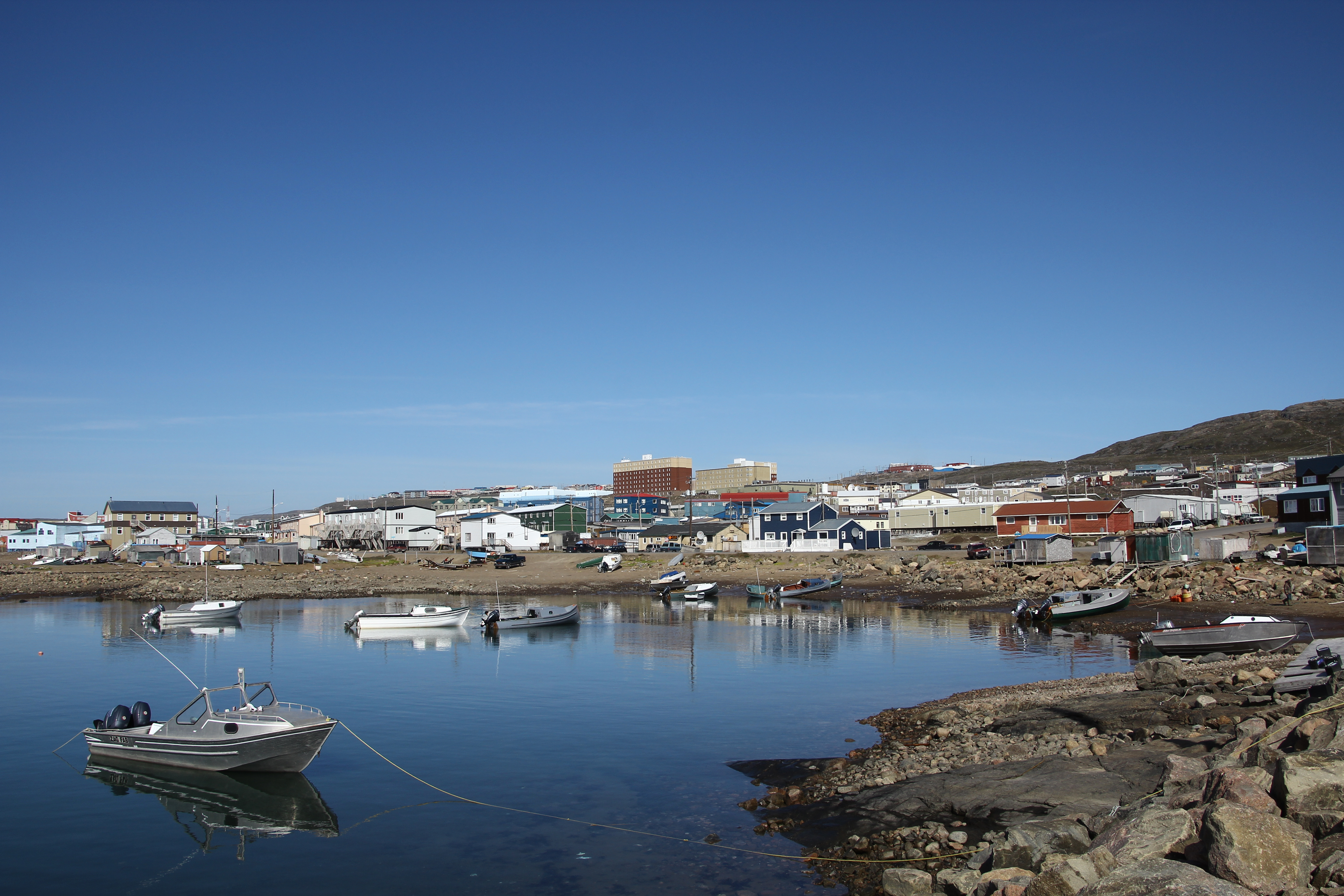
Iqaluit waterfront, 2011

Iqaluit has the Astro Hill Complex, the Nunatta Sunakkutaangit Museum and the Legislative Building of Nunavut and the Unikkaarvik Visitors Centre.

== Pre-contact ==
According to anthropologists and historians, the Inuit are the descendants of the Thule people who displaced the Dorset culture (in Inuktitut, the Tuniit). By 1300 the Inuit had trade routes with more southern cultures.

== History ==
About 1910, Europeans markets increased their interest in white fox pelts. The distribution and mobility of Inuit changed as they expanded their traditional hunting and fishing routes to participate in the white fox fur trade. Traditional food staples—such as seal and caribou—were not always found in the same regions as white fox. The Hudson's Bay Company—which was chartered in 1670—had been opening fur trading posts throughout Inuit and First Nations territory. By 1910, the HBC was restructured into a lands sales department, retail and fur trade. The HBC dominated the fur trade under minimal supervision from the Canadian government, and some Anglican and Catholic missionaries who lived near remote northern hamlets. By 1922, most of imported goods acquired by Inuit were from the HBC.

== Protected areas ==
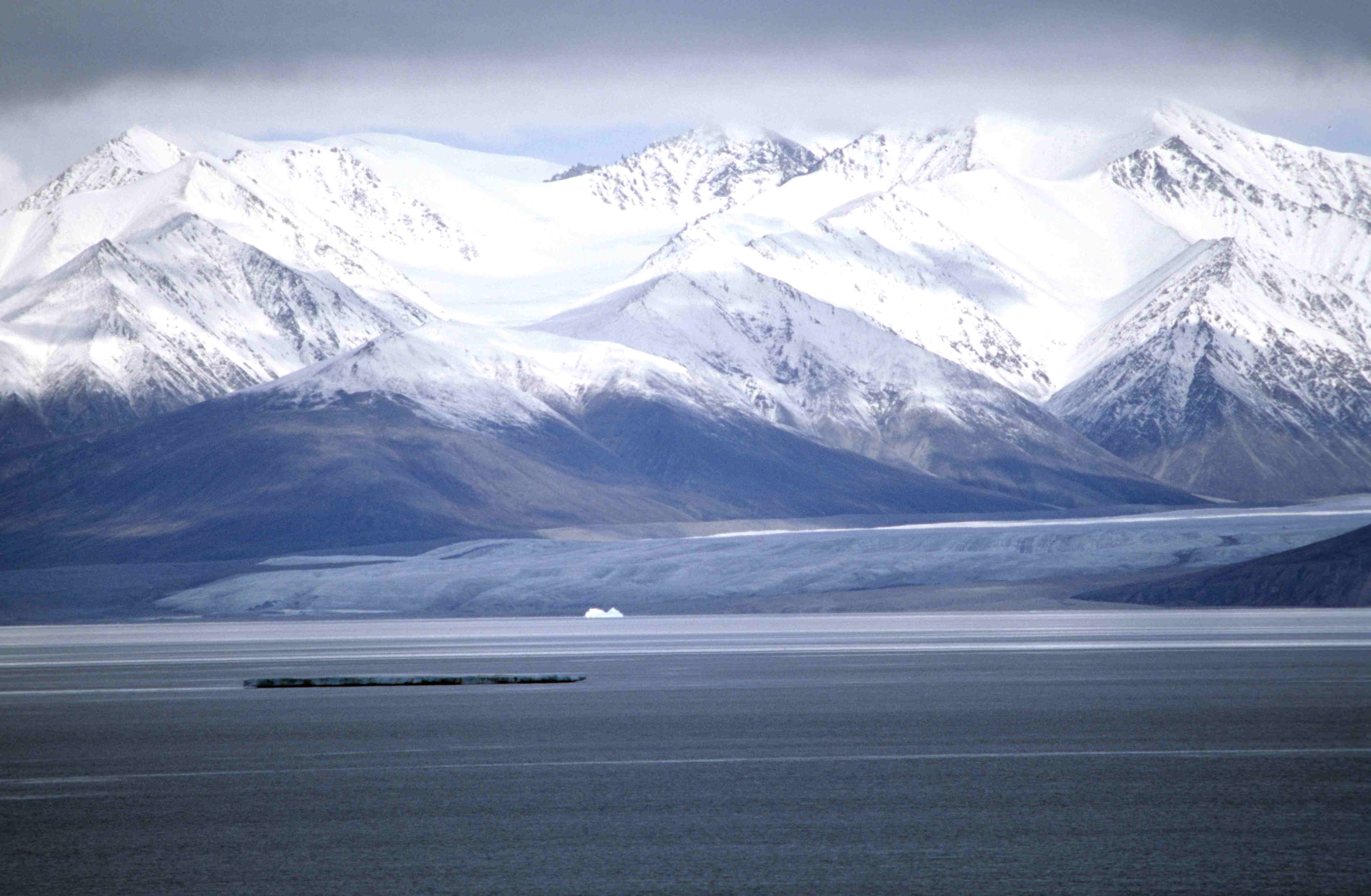
Sirmilik National Park

- Auyuittuq National Park
- Bowman Bay Wildlife Sanctuary
- Katannilik Territorial Park Reserve
- Kekerten Territorial Park
- Mallikjuak Territorial Park
- Pisuktinu-Tunngavik Territorial Park
- Polar Bear Pass National Wildlife Area
- Quammaarviit Territorial Park
- Quttinirpaaq National Park
- Sirmilik National Park
- Sylvia Grinnell Territorial Park

== Demographics ==
In the 2021 Census of Population conducted by Statistics Canada, the Qikiqtaaluk Region had a population of 19,355 living in 5,530 of its 6,573 total private dwellings, a change of 1.9% from its 2016 population of 18,988. With a land area of 970,554.61 km^{2} (374,733.23 sq mi), it had a population density of 0.0/km^{2} (0.1/sq mi) in 2021.

== Surrounding census divisions ==
- Division No. 11, Newfoundland and Labrador (Nunatsiavut)
- Division No. 23, Manitoba
- Inuvik Region
- Kivalliq Region
- Kitikmeot Region

== See also ==
- Akudnirmiut Inuit
- Netsilik Inuit
- Ellesmere Island Volcanics
- Strathcona Fiord
