= Nordair =

Regional airline of Canada (1947–1987)

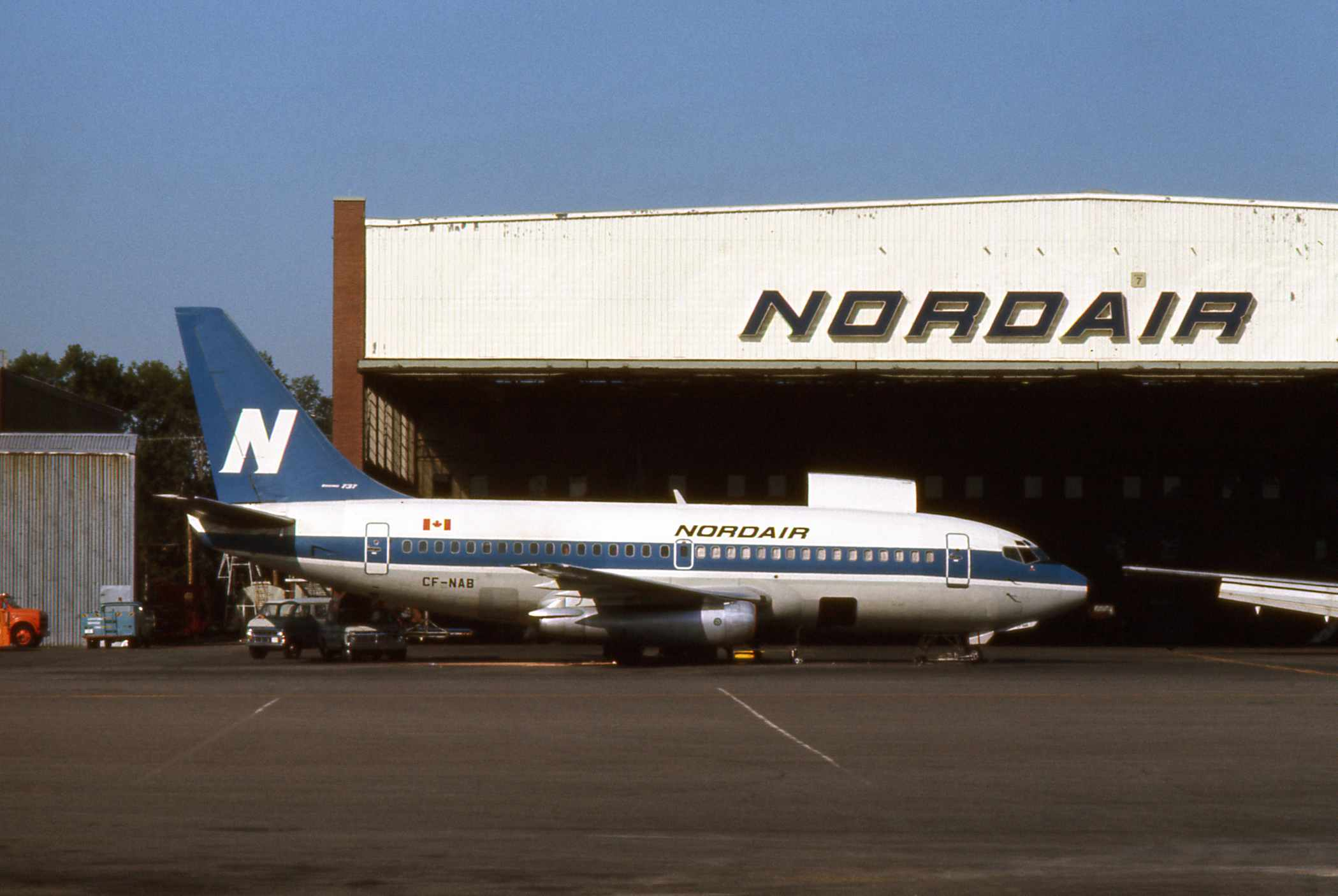
- Boeing 737-200 at the airline's base in Montreal
IATA	ICAO	Call sign
ND	NDR	NORDAIR
- Founded: 1947
- Ceased operations: March 27, 1987 (merged with Pacific Western Airlines and Canadian Pacific Air Lines to form Canadian Airlines International)
- Hubs: Montréal–Dorval; Montréal–Mirabel
- Destinations: Canada, United States
- Headquarters: Dorval, Montréal, Quebec
- Key people: Fernand "Frank" Henley, Founder and VP

Nordair was a Quebec-based airline in Canada founded in 1947 from the merger of Boreal Airways and Mont Laurier Aviation.

== History ==
The airline operated from the 1940s to the 1980s. Initially, most of its business was international and transatlantic passenger and freight charters and other contracts. It also operated scheduled flights to a number of destinations in eastern Canada and the Northwest Territories. Nordair flew out of Montreal's two airports: initially from Dorval Airport, now Montréal–Trudeau International Airport, and later from Montréal–Mirabel International Airport as this latter airfield did not open until 1975. It was headquartered in Montreal with operations at Dorval, Quebec and their head office at 1320 Boulevard Graham in Mont Royal.

Nordair was operating scheduled passenger services in July 1959 utilizing Douglas DC-3 and Douglas DC-4 propeller aircraft with routings of Montreal - Frobisher Bay (now Iqaluit) - Cape Dyer Airport; Montreal - Roberval - Fort Chimo (now Kuujjuaq) - Frobisher Bay; and Montreal - Quebec City - Roberval - Chibougamau.

The airline was still operating scheduled passenger flights 20 years later. According to Nordair's July 1, 1979 system timetable and route map, jet service was being operated as far west as Winnipeg and as far north as the Resolute Bay Airport in the Canadian Arctic with a number of destinations in Ontario and Quebec in Canada being served including Montreal (via Dorval Airport), Ottawa, Toronto, Quebec City, Hamilton, Ontario and Windsor, Ontario as well as Pittsburgh in the United States, primarily with Boeing 737-200 jetliners but also with Fairchild Hiller FH-227 turboprop aircraft. The airline was also operating scheduled passenger flights in 1975 with Lockheed L-188 Electra turboprop aircraft primarily to destinations in Quebec. Nordair was continuing to operate scheduled passenger flights in 1986 primarily with Boeing 737-200 jets.

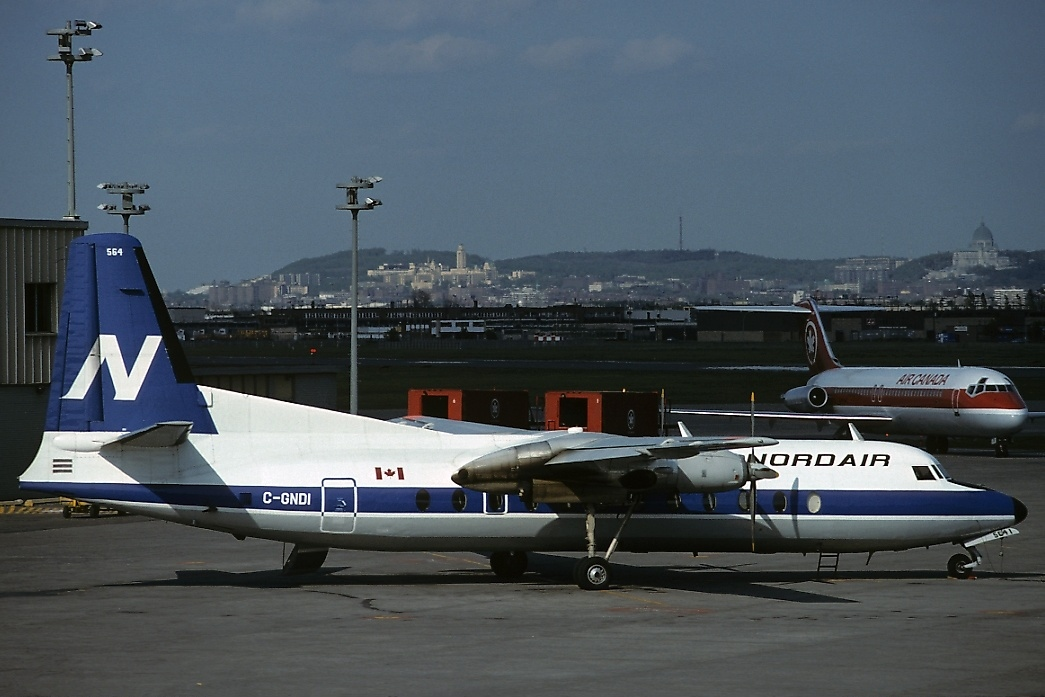
A Fairchild Hiller FH-227B at Montréal–Trudeau International Airport

=== Introduction of Boeing 737 jet aircraft ===
The airline was operating Boeing 737-200 passenger jet service in 1969 in both scheduled and charter operations according to the June 15, 1970 Nordair system timetable which contained the following marketing message concerning its leisure charter flights: SUNNY HOLIDAYS - BLUE TAIL JET CHARTER FLIGHTS TO THE SUN....BARBADOS - JAMAICA - BAHAMAS - FLORIDA - MEXICO. This same timetable also lists scheduled passenger service operated by Nordair with the Boeing 737-200 between Montreal Dorval and Fort Chimo (now Kuujjuaq), Frobisher Bay (now Iqaluit), Great Whale (now Kuujjuarapik), Hamilton and Resolute.

=== Merger and aftermath ===
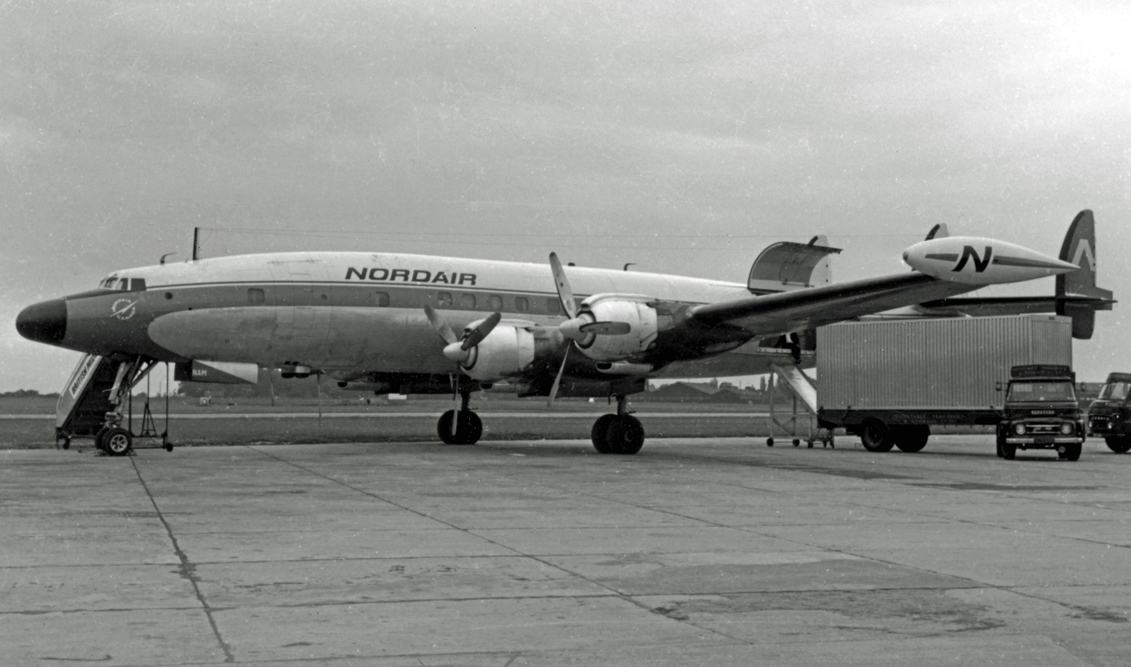
Lockheed L-1049H Super Constellation of Nordair at Manchester Airport England on a freight charter in 1966. The airline was also operating the Super Constellation in scheduled passenger service in 1968 on nonstop Montreal-Frobisher Bay and Montreal-Resolute routes.

Nordair was purchased by Canadian Pacific Air Lines which had operated as CP Air. On March 27, 1987, Pacific Western Airlines purchased Canadian Pacific Air Lines and then emerged as Canadian Airlines. The jet operation was absorbed into Canadian Airlines, while the turboprop operations were absorbed into Inter-Canadien. In 2000, that airline was acquired by Air Canada.

Intair, a scheduled passenger airline that was based in Canada and operated jet and turboprop aircraft, used Nordair's two letter "ND" airline code for its domestic flights in eastern Canada in 1989 until it ceased operations and went out of business.

Another company called Nordair Quebec 2000 Incorporated operated in 2000 as a domestic regional carrier and cargo operator in Quebec, but the licence and licence applications for the airline were suspended in 2006 by Transport Canada, and again the Nordair name disappeared from the airline industry

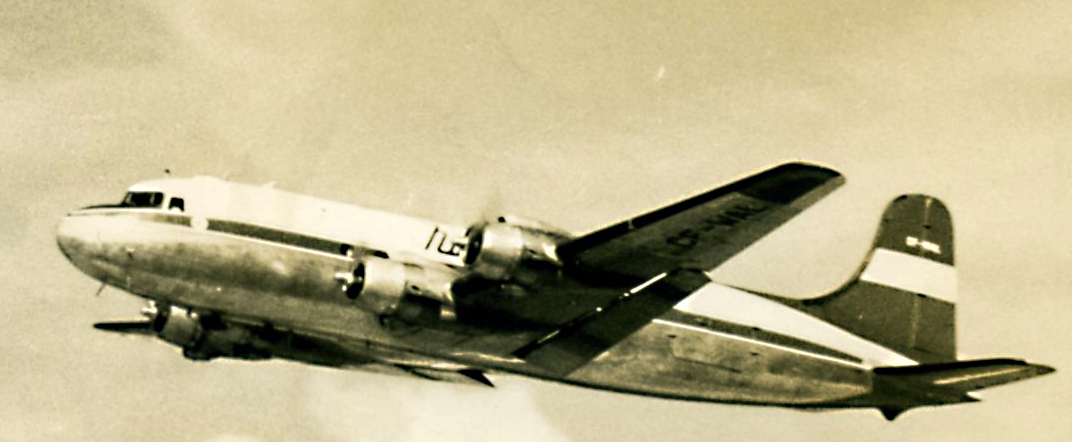
Nordair DC-4 Inflight

== Destinations ==
The following destinations in Canada were served by Nordair with scheduled passenger flights during the airline's existence:

=== Canada ===
- Ontario
  - Dryden, Dryden Regional Airport
  - Hamilton, John C. Munro Hamilton International Airport
  - Kingston, Kingston Norman Rogers Airport
  - Oshawa, Oshawa Executive Airport
  - Ottawa, Ottawa Macdonald–Cartier International Airport
  - Sarnia, Sarnia Chris Hadfield Airport
  - Sault Ste. Marie, Sault Ste. Marie Airport
  - Sudbury, Sudbury Airport
  - Thunder Bay, Thunder Bay International Airport
  - Toronto, Malton Airport
  - Windsor, Windsor International Airport

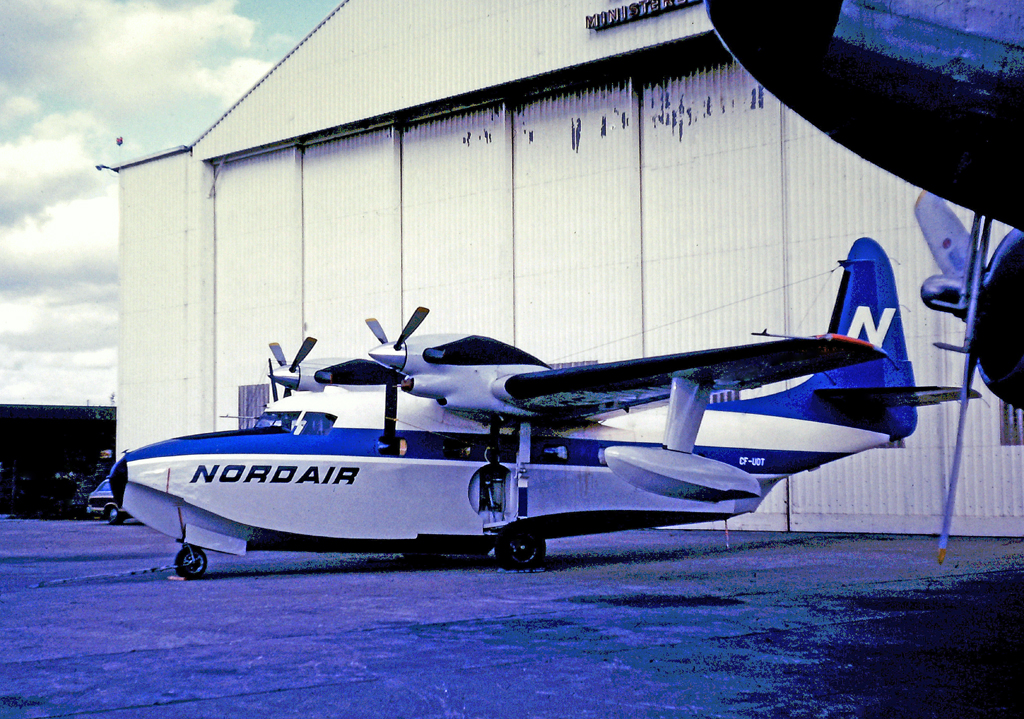
Nordair Grumman G-73 Mallard at Montreal Dorval in 1973

- Quebec
  - Raglan Mines (Asbestos Hill / Deception Bay), Kattiniq/Donaldson Airport
  - Bagotville (La Baie), Bagotville Airport
  - Chibougamau, Chibougamau/Chapais Airport
  - Dolbeau, Dolbeau-Saint-Félicien Airport
  - Kuujjuaq (formerly known as Fort Chimo), Kuujjuaq Airport
  - Great Whale / Poste-de-la-Baleine (now Kuujjuarapik), Kuujjuarapik Airport
  - Matagami, Matagami Airport
  - Montreal, Montréal–Mirabel International Airport
  - Montreal, Montréal–Trudeau International Airport (Dorval Airport)
  - Quebec City, Québec City Jean Lesage International Airport
  - Radisson (La Grande), La Grande Rivière Airport
  - Roberval, Roberval Airport
  - Rouyn-Noranda, Rouyn-Noranda Airport
  - Val-d'Or, Val-d'Or Airport
- Manitoba
  - Winnipeg, Winnipeg James Armstrong Richardson International Airport
- Nunavut
  - Arctic Bay, Nanisivik Airport
  - Broughton Island (now Qikiqtarjuaq), Broughton Island Airport
  - Cape Dorset (now Kinngait), Cape Dorset Airport
  - Cape Dyer, Cape Dyer Airport
  - Clyde River / Cape Christian, Clyde River Airport
  - Coral Harbour, Coral Harbour Airport
  - Hall Beach (now Sanirajak), Hall Beach Airport
  - Igloolik, Igloolik Airport
  - Frobisher Bay (now Iqaluit), Iqaluit Airport
  - Nanisivik, Nanisivik Airport
  - Pangnirtung, Pangnirtung Airport
  - Pelly Bay (now Kugaaruk), Kugaaruk Airport
  - Resolute, Resolute Bay Airport
- Northwest Territories
  - Inuvik, Inuvik (Mike Zubko) Airport
  - Yellowknife, Yellowknife Airport

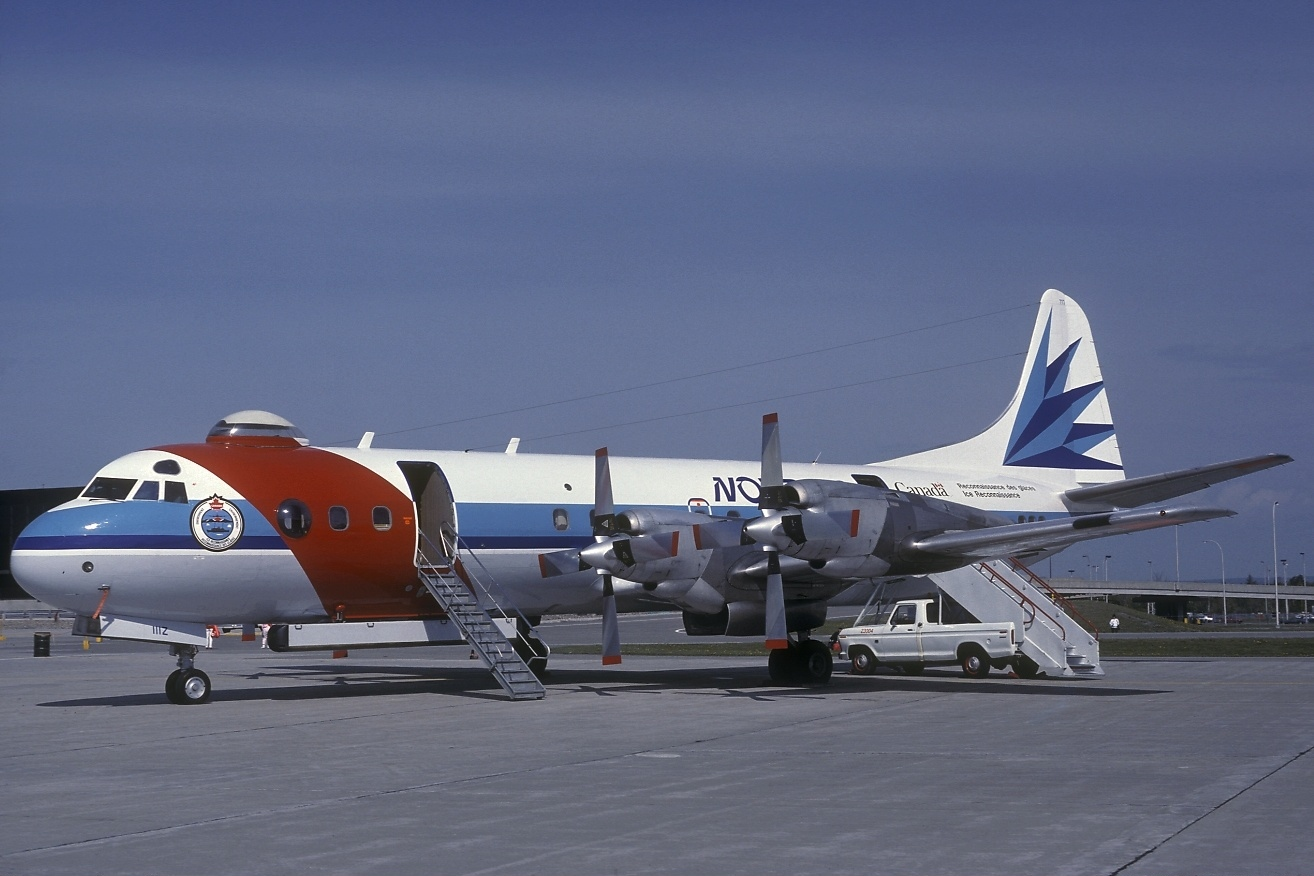
Lockheed L-188C Electra operating as Environment Canada ice patrol

=== Outside of Canada ===
Most of the flights to the United States, the Bahamas, the Caribbean, Mexico and Europe were charter flights, as Nordair operated only a few scheduled passenger services outside of Canada.

- North America
  - Barbados
    - Grantley Adams International Airport
  - The Bahamas
    - Grand Bahama, Grand Bahama International Airport
    - Varadero, Cuba
  - Jamaica
  - Mexico
    - Cancún, Cancún International Airport
  - United States
    - Detroit, Detroit Metropolitan Airport
    - Fort Lauderdale Fort Lauderdale–Hollywood International Airport
    - Los Angeles, Los Angeles International Airport
    - Miami, Miami International Airport
    - New York City, John F. Kennedy International Airport
    - Omaha, Eppley Airfield
    - Orlando, Orlando International Airport
    - Pittsburgh, Pittsburgh International Airport
    - Tampa Bay, St. Pete–Clearwater International Airport
    - SeaTac, Washington, Seattle–Tacoma International Airport
    - Van Nuys, Van Nuys Airport

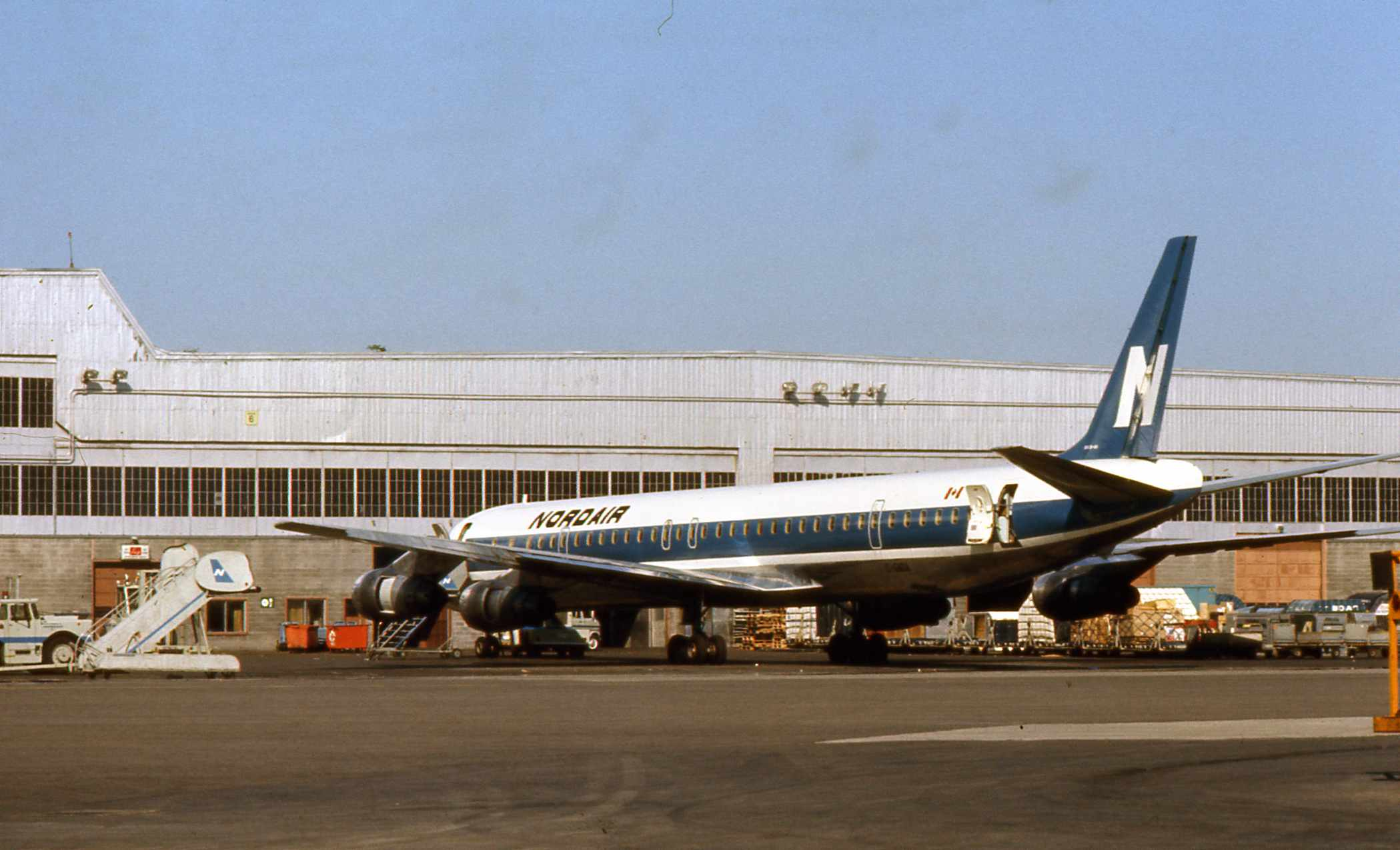
Nordair Douglas DC-8 at the operations base.

  - Europe
    - Amsterdam, Amsterdam Airport Schiphol
    - Athens, Ellinikon International Airport
    - Budapest, Budapest Ferenc Liszt International Airport
    - Copenhagen, Copenhagen Airport
    - Düsseldorf, Düsseldorf Airport
    - Frankfurt, Frankfurt Airport
    - Glasgow, Abbotsinch Airport
    - London, Gatwick Airport
    - Manchester, Manchester Airport
    - Shannon, Shannon Airport

=== Military contract flight services ===
Nordair served as an air service contractor to the Canadian Armed Forces, including ice reconnaissance missions flown with a Lockheed L-188 Electra turboprop aircraft and United States Air Force support flights to Distant Early Warning Line stations from Alaska to Baffin Island.

== Fleet ==
Nordair had the following aircraft registered by Transport Canada and listed in their timetables. Over the years they had at least 40 aircraft.

Nordair fleet
Aircraft	Number	Variants	Notes
Beechcraft			At least one aircraft. Not listed with Transport Canada
Boeing 737	15	737-200	Gravel strip equipped, includes combi aircraft
Cessna 150	1	150K	
Consolidated PBY Catalina			Flying boat. At least one aircraft listed as a Canso. Not listed with Transport Canada
Convair CV-990	2		Two aircraft, N5609 and N5615 were leased from Modern Air Transport and operated on charter services
Curtiss C-46 Commando			At least one aircraft. Not listed with Transport Canada
de Havilland Canada DHC-2 Beaver	1	Beaver I	
de Havilland Canada DHC-3 Otter	2		
de Havilland Canada DHC-6 Twin Otter			At least one aircraft. Not listed with Transport Canada
Douglas C-47 Skytrain			At least one aircraft. Not listed with Transport Canada
Douglas DC-3	1	DC-3SC	Former Douglas C-47 Skytrain military aircraft
Douglas DC-4			At least one aircraft. Not listed with Transport Canada
Douglas DC-6		DC-6A, DC-6B	At least two aircraft. Not listed with Transport Canada
Douglas DC-8	1	DC-8-52	Operated on charter services
Super Douglas DC-8 series 60	1	DC-8-61	Operated on charter services, Reg. C-GDNA/>
Fairchild FH-227	4	FH-227B, FH-227D, FH-227E	
Grumman G-73 Mallard			At least one aircraft. Not listed with Transport Canada
Lockheed L-1049 Super Constellation		L-1049G, L-1049H	At least two aircraft. Not listed with Transport Canada
Lockheed L-188 Electra	2	L-188C	
Piper PA-31 Navajo	1	PA-31 Navajo	
Short SC.7 Skyvan			At least one aircraft. Not listed with Transport Canada

The Boeing 737 fleet included the combi aircraft version for mixed passenger/freight operations.

Nordair also operated de Havilland Canada DHC-6 Twin Otter STOL capable turboprop aircraft during the early and mid 1970s in scheduled passenger service between the community of Frobisher Bay (now Iqaluit) and various local destinations in this region of the Canadian Arctic.

Another type operated by the airline was the Grumman G-73 Mallard amphibious aircraft which had been converted with turboprop engines and was capable of landing on both land and water (see above photo).

In addition, a division of Nordair, Nordair Metro, was operating Convair 580 turboprop aircraft in 1986.

== Accidents and incidents ==
- On 6 February 1973, the Douglas C-47B CF-HTH was damaged beyond economic repair when it was hit by a vehicle at an airport in Montreal.
- On 15 November 1975, Douglas C-47 C-FCSC was damaged beyond economic repair by a fire at La Grande Rivière Airport, Radisson, Quebec.
- On 31 March 1977 Lockheed L-188 Electra CF-NAZ, while parked on the ramp at CFB Summerside, was severely damaged when a Canadian Armed Forces CP-107 (tail 10737) attempted a three-engine landing in bad weather. She was later rebuilt in Van Nuys and re-registered as C-GNDZ.

== See also ==
- List of defunct airlines of Canada
