= Nanisivik Mine =

Former zinc and lead mine in Nunavut, Canada

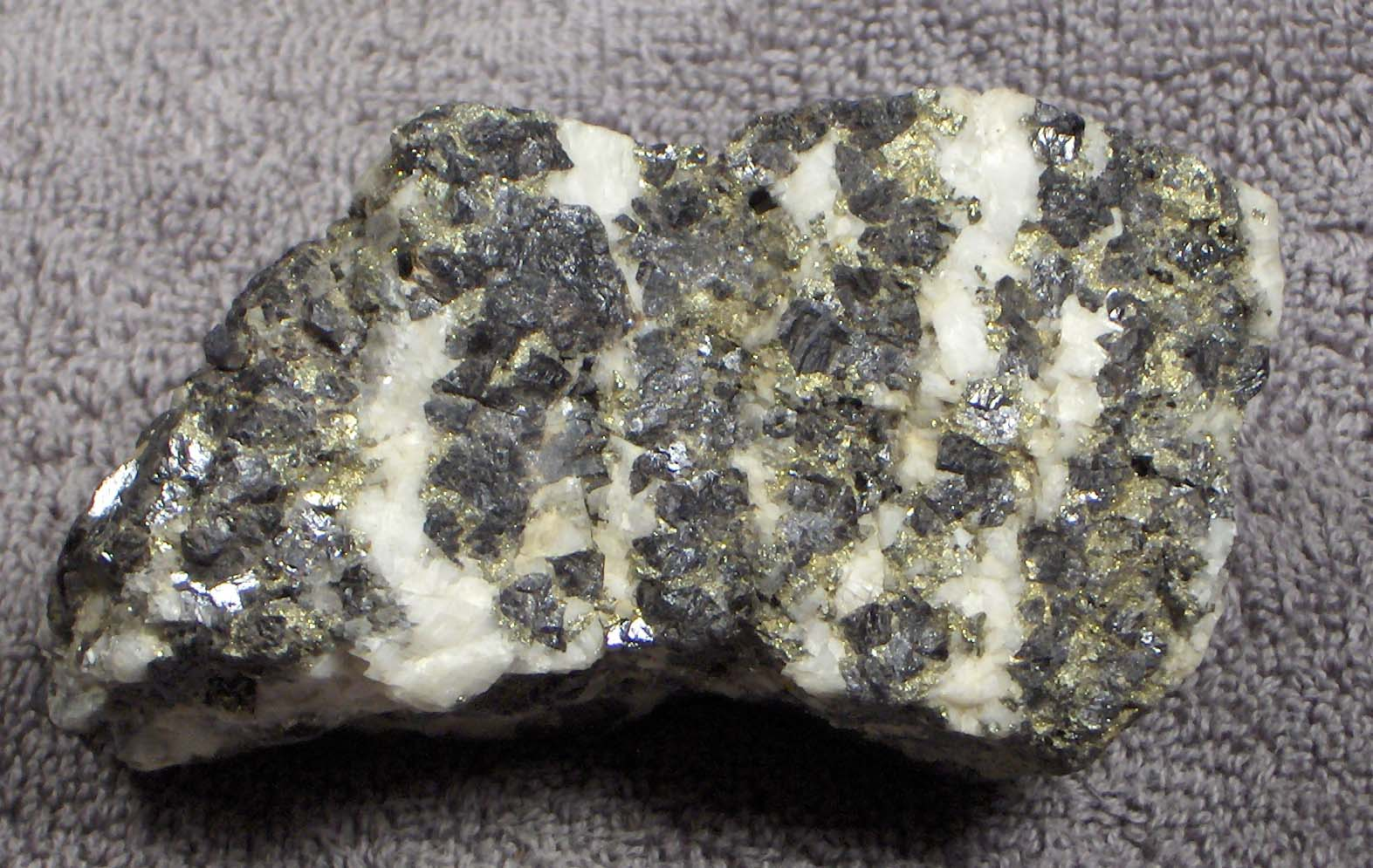
- Nanisivik zinc-lead ore

- Location in Canada Nanisivik Mine (Canada)
- Location: Nanisivik, Nunavut, Canada; 73°02′40″N 084°32′14″W
- Products: Zinc lead silver
- Opened: 1976
- Closed: 2002
- Company: Breakwater Resources
- Website: Breakwater Resources
- Acquired: 1996 (Breakwater)

Nanisivik Mine was a zinc-lead mine in the company town of Nanisivik, Nunavut, 750 km (470 mi) north of the Arctic Circle on Baffin Island. It was Canada's first mine in the Arctic. The mine first opened on 15 October 1976 and permanently closed in September 2002 due to low metal prices and declining resources. Mine reclamation began in April 2003. It was one of the most northerly mines in the world.

The mine was served by a port and dock located about 2.7 km (1.7 mi) north. It was used for shipping concentrate from the site, and receiving supplies. It is currently used by the Canadian Coast Guard for training and is intended to become Nanisivik Naval Facility.

The mine also had its own airport (Nanisivik Airport) located about 7 km (4.3 mi) southwest and was the main airport for Arctic Bay, until they expanded the Arctic Bay Airport. The airport is about 19 km (12 mi) directly southeast of Arctic Bay but the road between them is 32 km (20 mi).

== Climate ==
Nanisivik has a tundra climate (ET) with long, cold winters and very short, chilly summers that are rarely mild. Early winter tends to be snowiest period of the year, with around 40% of all yearly snowfall falling during this short period.

Climate data for Nanisivik (Nanisivik Airport) Climate ID: 2402730; coordinates 72°59′N 84°37′W; elevation: 641.9 m (2,106 ft); 1981–2010 normals
Month	Jan	Feb	Mar	Apr	May	Jun	Jul	Aug	Sep	Oct	Nov	Dec	Year
Record high humidex	−3.0	1.2	−2.2	−1.2	6.5	14.5	18.4	16.7	9.0	1.2	−6.3	−1.3	18.4
Record high °C (°F)	−2.0 (28.4)	2.0 (35.6)	−3.0 (26.6)	−0.5 (31.1)	7.0 (44.6)	18.5 (65.3)	18.2 (64.8)	17.0 (62.6)	8.5 (47.3)	2.0 (35.6)	−6.0 (21.2)	−4.4 (24.1)	18.5 (65.3)
Mean daily maximum °C (°F)	−26.8 (−16.2)	−27.2 (−17.0)	−24.7 (−12.5)	−16.6 (2.1)	−7.6 (18.3)	2.2 (36.0)	7.5 (45.5)	3.9 (39.0)	−3.3 (26.1)	−11.3 (11.7)	−19.8 (−3.6)	−23.6 (−10.5)	−12.3 (9.9)
Daily mean °C (°F)	−29.6 (−21.3)	−29.9 (−21.8)	−27.6 (−17.7)	−19.8 (−3.6)	−10.3 (13.5)	−0.1 (31.8)	5.1 (41.2)	1.7 (35.1)	−5.0 (23.0)	−13.6 (7.5)	−22.5 (−8.5)	−26.3 (−15.3)	−14.8 (5.4)
Mean daily minimum °C (°F)	−32.4 (−26.3)	−32.3 (−26.1)	−30.1 (−22.2)	−22.9 (−9.2)	−13.0 (8.6)	−2.4 (27.7)	2.7 (36.9)	−0.5 (31.1)	−6.7 (19.9)	−15.8 (3.6)	−24.9 (−12.8)	−28.7 (−19.7)	−17.2 (1.0)
Record low °C (°F)	−48.5 (−55.3)	−53.0 (−63.4)	−47.5 (−53.5)	−42.0 (−43.6)	−28.3 (−18.9)	−14.0 (6.8)	−6.0 (21.2)	−10.0 (14.0)	−19.5 (−3.1)	−35.0 (−31.0)	−39.4 (−38.9)	−45.5 (−49.9)	−53.0 (−63.4)
Record low wind chill	−62.9	−72.3	−67.0	−54.8	−39.4	−24.9	−12.8	−21.0	−30.3	−50.0	−53.5	−60.6	−72.3
Average precipitation mm (inches)	5.4 (0.21)	5.1 (0.20)	8.4 (0.33)	10.9 (0.43)	24.0 (0.94)	25.2 (0.99)	45.7 (1.80)	45.0 (1.77)	38.4 (1.51)	37.4 (1.47)	18.1 (0.71)	7.3 (0.29)	270.9 (10.67)
Average rainfall mm (inches)	0.0 (0.0)	0.0 (0.0)	0.0 (0.0)	0.0 (0.0)	0.1 (0.00)	6.7 (0.26)	37.0 (1.46)	29.2 (1.15)	4.4 (0.17)	0.0 (0.0)	0.0 (0.0)	0.0 (0.0)	77.3 (3.04)
Average snowfall cm (inches)	5.4 (2.1)	5.2 (2.0)	8.4 (3.3)	11.2 (4.4)	24.0 (9.4)	17.7 (7.0)	8.5 (3.3)	15.0 (5.9)	32.3 (12.7)	38.2 (15.0)	17.9 (7.0)	7.5 (3.0)	191.3 (75.3)
Average precipitation days (≥ 0.2 mm)	4.4	4.6	6.2	5.7	9.6	8.8	12.4	12.6	13.3	14.2	8.4	6.3	106.5
Average rainy days (≥ 0.2 mm)	0.0	0.0	0.0	0.0	0.0	2.2	10.4	8.1	1.7	0.0	0.0	0.0	22.3
Average snowy days (≥ 0.2 cm)	4.4	4.6	6.2	5.8	9.6	7.1	3.0	5.4	12.1	14.3	8.5	6.4	87.3
Source: Environment and Climate Change Canada Canadian Climate Normals 1981–2010

== See also ==
- Polaris mine
- El Toqui mine
- El Mochito mine
