= 1953 Quebec Noorduyn Norseman crash =

Aviation incident in Canada

1953 Norseman CF-CPL crash and search operation
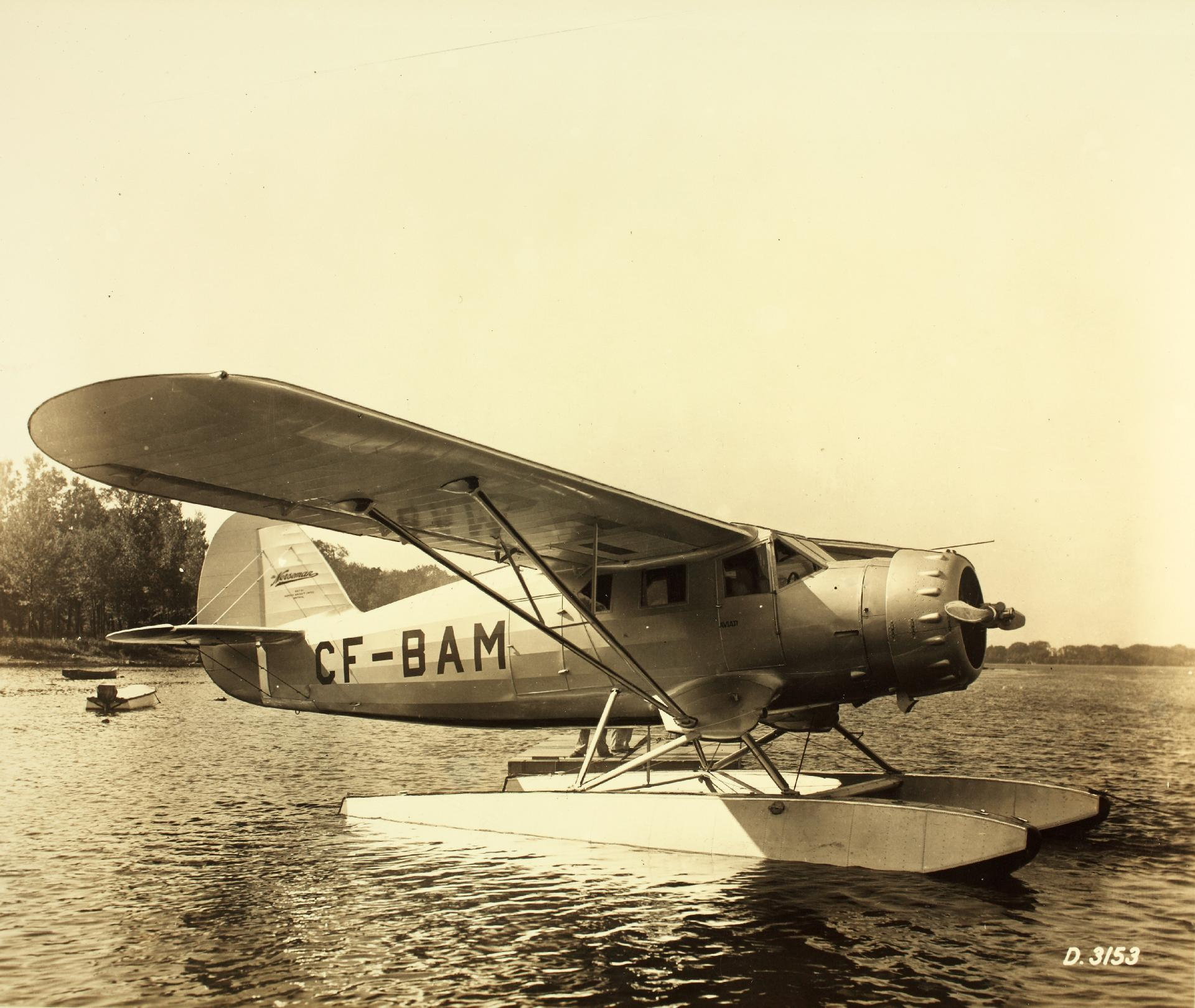
- Similar Noorduyn Norseman as the one involved

Accident
- Date: 25 August 1953
- Summary: Forced landing in wilderness, prolonged survival, successful rescue
- Site: Lake Emmanuel, Northern Quebec, Canada

Aircraft
- Aircraft type: Noorduyn Norseman
- Operator: Mont Laurier Aviation
- Registration: CF-CPL
- Flight origin: Fort Chimo, Canada
- Destination: Roberval, Canada
- Occupants: 7
- Passengers: 5
- Crew: 2
- Fatalities: 0
- Survivors: 7

The 1953 Quebec Noorduyn Norseman crash, was an aviation incident in which a Noorduyn Norseman floatplane carrying seven people became lost in the wilderness of northern Quebec, Canada, after a forced landing on a remote lake during a flight from Fort Chimo to Roberval.

The search operation, codenamed Operation Chimo, ultimately became the largest search-and-rescue mission conducted in Canada. After nearly six weeks of isolation, all occupants were rescued alive following an extensive multi-agency search operation involving the Royal Canadian Air Force and civilian operators.

== Aircraft and occupants ==
The aircraft involved was a Noorduyn Norseman CF-CPL, a Canadian bush plane widely used for northern transport operations. After recovery, the aircraft was reportedly returned to service before later being destroyed in a separate accident in 1955.

There were two crew members onboard, pilot Bob Mullin and mechanical engineer Dick Everitt. There were five passengers from Fennimore Iron Company onboard. Dutch engineer ir. K. Koeten from Rotterdam; German geologist Rolf Thienhaus; and Canadians Marc Levesque, University of Toronto student Ray Vanstone and Vic Abel.

== Flight and forced landing ==
The Noorduyn Norseman CF-CPL departed from Fort Chimo (now Kuujjuaq) bound for Roberval, Quebec. During the flight over poorly mapped northern terrain, the aircraft became lost and eventually made a forced landing on Lake Emmanuel in the wilderness. Search efforts began shortly afterward but were repeatedly hampered by the vast and unmapped region.

== Survival in the wilderness ==
Following the forced landing, the seven survivors established a camp near the aircraft using its emergency equipment, which included a tent, cooking utensils, tools, firearms, fishing gear, and a limited supply of emergency rations. Believing that search aircraft would locate them within days, they initially remained near the aircraft while maintaining signal fires and organizing hunting and fishing expeditions.

Food supplies gradually diminished despite attempts to supplement them with berries, mushrooms, fish, and occasional small game. Hunting and trapping became increasingly unsuccessful, forcing the group onto progressively stricter rations while physical strength steadily declined as colder autumn weather set in.

Survivors described prolonged exhaustion, worsening cold exposure, and the psychological strain of repeated but distant aircraft sightings that did not immediately result in rescue. Despite occasional disagreements, the group remained cohesive under the leadership of pilot Robert Mullin, who organized daily survival activities and hunting expeditions.

As conditions deteriorated further, starvation-level rations became common, with only occasional canned food remaining. The group eventually resorted to eating moss and other edible vegetation when game became unavailable, while several members became too weak to undertake lengthy hunting expeditions.

To improve their chances of being found, the survivors maintained signal fires for much of their ordeal and used the aircraft's remaining fuel to periodically run its engine, allowing them to recharge the battery and transmit distress calls until the radio became inoperative. They later anchored the aircraft away from the shoreline in the hope that it would be more visible to search aircraft.

== Search and rescue ==
Search operations began several days after the aircraft became overdue, when Mont Laurier Aviation notified the Royal Canadian Air Force (RCAF) rescue coordination centre in Halifax. The operation, codenamed Operation Chimo, ultimately became the largest search-and-rescue mission conducted in Canada.

Initially led by No. 103 Rescue Unit from RCAF Station Bagotville, the search involved 33 military aircraft and ten civilian aircraft, including Avro Lancaster maritime reconnaissance aircraft, Dakotas, Canso flying boats, and civilian bush aircraft. Aircraft searched the Norseman's expected route while checking fuel caches and investigating reported sightings, but poor weather, low cloud, fog, and the heavily forested terrain severely hampered aerial observation.

Several reported sightings of aircraft wreckage or unusual radio transmissions prompted temporary changes to the search area, but none led to the missing aircraft. The operation was suspended on two occasions before being resumed with additional military and civilian resources, including aircraft from the United States Air Force. During the final phase, the search area was widened and additional civilian aircraft were requisitioned under federal emergency powers.

Meanwhile, the survivors made several unsuccessful attempts to determine their location on foot. They also maintained signal fires for approximately a month, transmitted distress calls using the aircraft's radio while battery power remained available, and eventually anchored the aircraft away from shore in the hope that it would be more visible from the air.

On 2 October 1953, an RCAF Avro Lancaster of No. 404 Maritime Reconnaissance Squadron spotted the survivors near Lake Emmanuel and dropped food and emergency supplies. Shortly afterwards, a Canso operated by Mont Laurier Aviation landed on the lake and evacuated four of the survivors, while an RCAF Canso located the remaining three after spotting their signal fire during a follow-up search.

The last survivors were flown to RCAF Station Bagotville on 3 October 1953. By the end of Operation Chimo, a combined force of 46 military, civilian and United States Air Force aircraft had flown more than 900 hours during the 39-day search.
