= Bernadette Ivalooarjuk Saumik =

Inuk artist

- Born: 1938 (age 87–88); Arctic Bay, Northwest Territories
- Known for: stone sculptures

Bernadette Ivalooarjuk Saumik (born 1938) is an Inuk artist known for her stone sculptures. Saumik was born in Arctic Bay, Northwest Territories.

Her work is included in the collections of the National Gallery of Canada, the Winnipeg Art Gallery and the Bowers Museum.
