= Akudnirmiut =

Inuit group in Nunavut, Canada

Akudnirmiut are an Inuit group that is located on eastern Baffin Island, Qikiqtaaluk Region, Nunavut, Canada. Their territory is situated in the southern Home Bay region, between Clyde Inlet and Cumberland Sound. Arliaktung was an Akudnirmiut village north of Home Bay. According to Franz Boas (1888), they populated the Henry Kater Peninsula, Eglinton Fiord, and Sam Ford Fiord. Their territory overlaps with the Tununirmiut.

The Akudnirmiut are noted for the flat-bottomed East Canadian Arctic kayak. They have been known to construct tents near the floe edge of Davis Strait when whaling.
