= Nanisivik Naval Facility =

Naval refuelling facility in Nunavut

- Installation navale de Nanisivik (French)
- Nanisivik, Nunavut
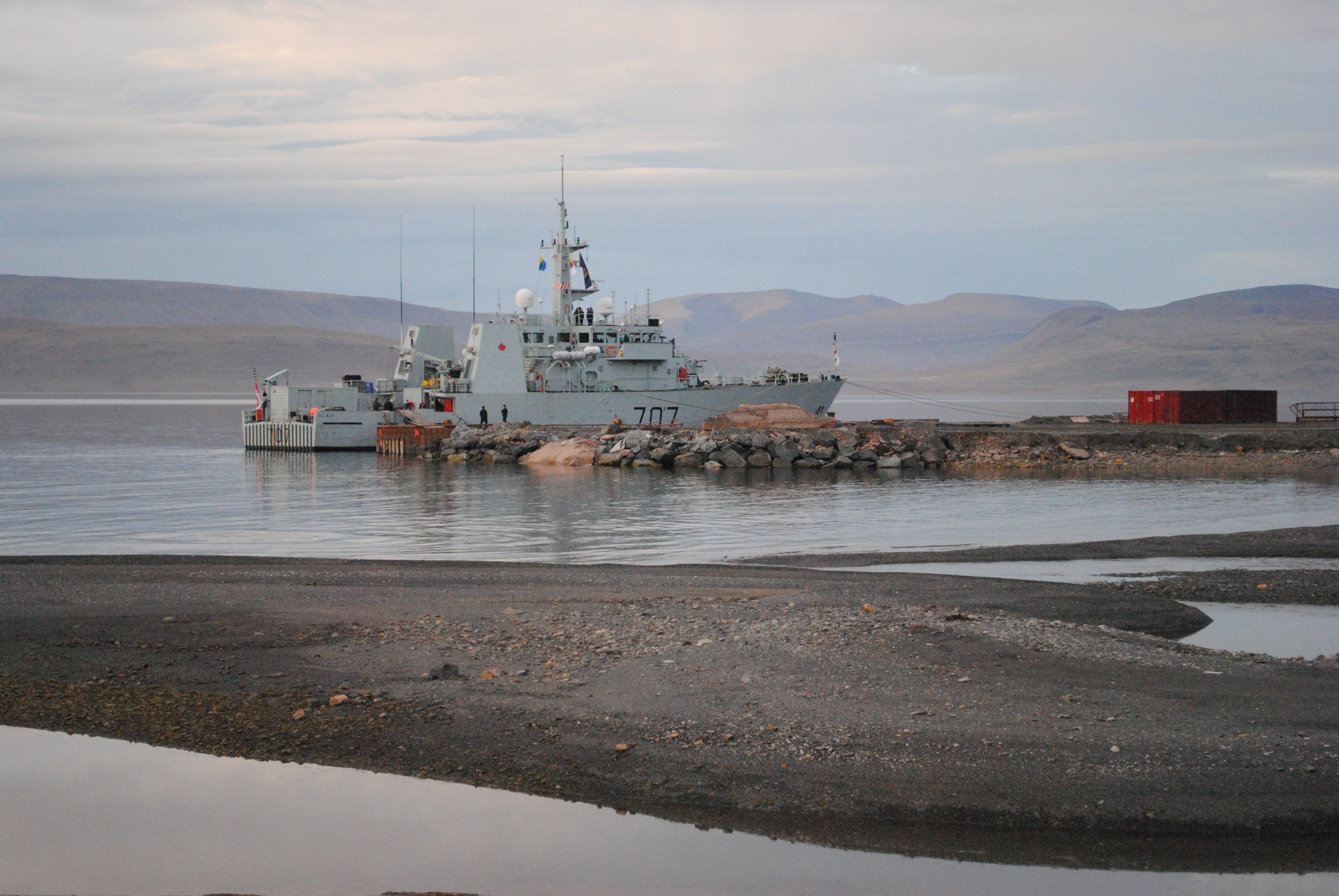
- HMCS Goose Bay moored at Nanisivik.

Site information
- Type: Arctic refuelling facility
- Controlled by: Canadian Forces

Location
- Location on Baffin Island
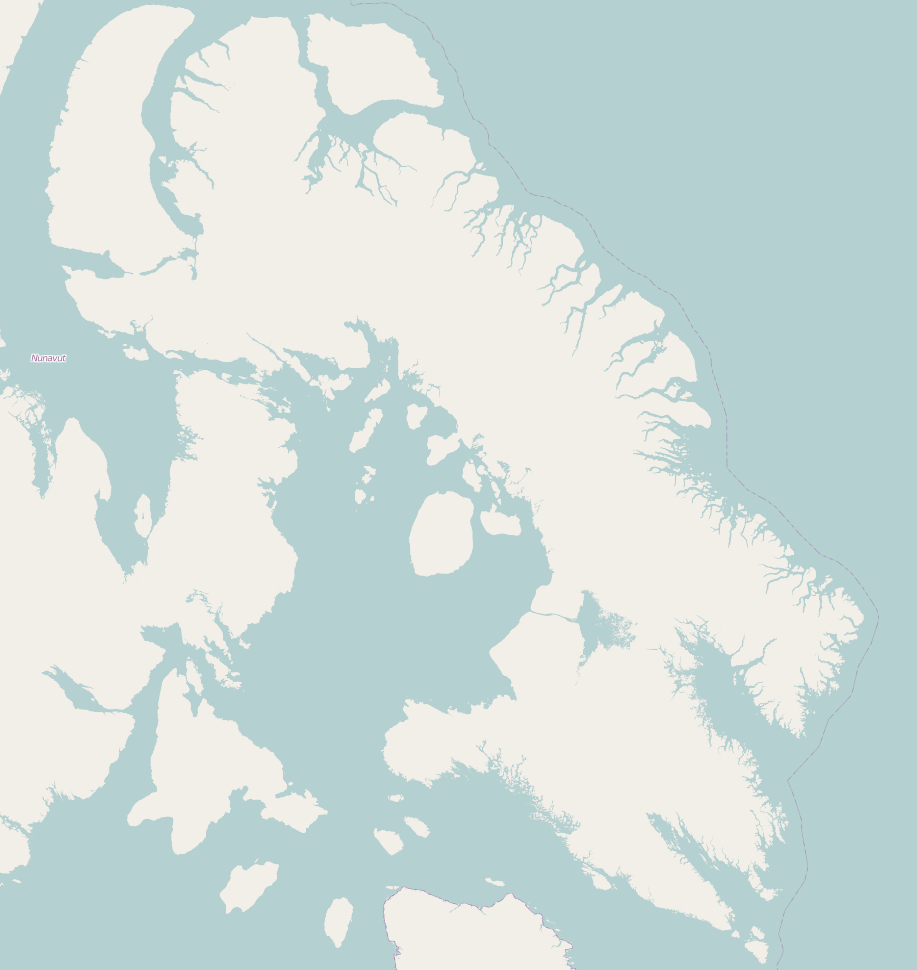
- Location within Baffin Island Location within Nunavut Location within Canada
- Coordinates: 73.068889°N 84.549167°W

Site history
- Built: In construction since 2015
- In use: Very limited use of new facility from 2019; to be shut down and offloaded

The Nanisivik Naval Facility (French: Installation Navale de Nanisivik) is a Canadian Forces naval facility on Baffin Island, Nunavut. The station is built at the former lead-zinc mine site near the former company town of Nanisivik. The facility was undergoing final testing in mid-2019. Full operational capability had been expected to be achieved by mid-2020 with the first refuelling of a Royal Canadian Navy ship. However, in July 2020 it was confirmed that work on the facility would not be completed until 2022. On 30 March 2022, it was reported that the completion of the facility would be further delayed to 2023. Then in November 2022, the Auditor General of Canada reported that the facility would start to be used by the navy regularly beginning in 2025.

In 2026 it was indicated that the facility would be shut down and offloaded.

== Description ==
The naval station was originally planned to be the home port of the Arctic offshore patrol ships that were proposed under the Harper government plan. These ships have ice-breaking capability and help the government's goal to enforce Canada's sovereignty over the region. As well, these ships would likely allow the Victoria-class submarines to travel in the Arctic regions.

Detailed planning for the facility began in August 2007, with environmental studies and assessments to be carried out in the summer of 2008. That design has since been downgraded to a docking and refuelling station. The port's operational time was also scaled back to just a four-month period in the summertime. Construction was expected to begin in 2013, with the station operational by 2016. However, construction delays continued and the opening of the port was put off until 2017 with the intent to be fully operational by 2018.

The station will be primarily used for refuelling Arctic patrol and other government vessels. The base currently consists of storage tanks for fuelling of the new Harry DeWolf-class offshore patrol vessels, a site office, and a wharf's operator shelter. The main purpose of the base is to allow these new vessels to patrol the breadth of Canada's arctic seas during the four-month summer season. The facility has two 3.75-million-litre (820,000 imp gal; 990,000 US gal) fuel tanks connected directly to the jetty by a pipeline. The base also has an unheated storage facility.

== History ==
The community of Nanisivik was originally built to support the Nanisivik Mine (1976 to 2002), a lead-zinc mine on Baffin Island. The mine was serviced by a jetty for receiving ocean freight, later used by the Canadian Coast Guard for training, and the Nanisivik Airport, which was capable of receiving jet aircraft and closed in 2011. Falling metal prices and shrinking resources led to the mine's closure in 2002.

On 8 August 2007, CBC News reported documents from the Canadian Forces showing plans to convert the site into a naval station. The plan was to turn the former mine's existing port into a deepwater facility at a cost of $60 million. On 10 August 2007, Prime Minister Stephen Harper announced construction of a new docking and refuelling facility at Nanisivik for the Canadian Forces, in an effort to maintain a Canadian presence in Arctic waters during the navigable season (June–October). The choice for Nanisivik as a site was partially based on its location within the eastern entrance to the Northwest Passage, via Admiralty Inlet, and the existence of a deep-water berthing facility at the site, as well as a location of the airport. The United States Space Force's Pituffik Space Base is 600 km (370 mi) to the northeast in Greenland.

On 20 August 2010, the Kingston-class coastal defence vessel HMCS Goose Bay became the first Canadian warship to secure to the Nanisivik jetty as part of Operation Nanook. Two days later, the frigate HMCS Montréal secured alongside for a photo opportunity. The Coast Guard icebreaker CCGS Henry Larsen was also present, but did not go alongside at that time.

In 2011 and 2012, the government started backing down on the Nanisivik conversion plans, explaining that construction in the far north is too expensive. Total costs in 2011 were set at $175 million with an extra $12 million for the design. However, costs rose $16 million above the proposed $100 million budget by 2013. Reports later surfaced that the cost of the original plan more than doubled its original estimate, coming in at $258 million. Subsequently, the Department of National Defence scaled back its plans for the facility to only operate during the summer, remove the jet-capable airstrip and reduce the infrastructure at the port to a smaller tank farm, fewer personnel requirements and an unheated warehouse.

=== Construction ===
Engineering for the first of four phases of design for the facility was completed by the British Columbia office of WorleyParsons at a cost of $900,000. This phase included preliminary design work and construction requirements. Construction was originally expected to begin in 2011, and the facility was expected to be operational by 2014. Nyrstar NV, a mining and metals company, began performing remediation work in late 2010 with the tanks from the old tank farm being disposed of in 2011.

Initial delays were caused by the sinking of the wharf. Measurements taken in 2010 showed that the wharf had sunk about two m (6 ft 7 in) and causes were looked for. Drilling performed in 2011 showed a deep layer of clay below the wharf, leading engineers to believe the clay was compressing and settling the wharf. The settling was among the reasons the plan for the port was scaled back.

Upon receiving approval from the Nunavut Impact Review Board in 2013, construction began in August 2014. Rock crushing and other site preparation began in 2015, with construction on the new tank farm and service roads in 2016–17. By July 2017 the roofs of the fuel tanks had been placed. Final checks on the facility were supposed to be performed during the summer months of 2018 in preparation for the base becoming operational in late 2018. However, in mid-2019 it was announced that final tests were taking place. In 2020 it was confirmed that the station would now not be fully operational until 2022. Subsequently, in March 2022, it was announced that the start of the operation will be postponed to 2023.

In a 2024 update, it was announced the facility is slated to open in 2025. The updated site plan includes unheated fuel storage tanks and pipelines, a site office, a wharf's operator shelter, an unheated storage building, and a helicopter pad. The unheated fuel tanks require testing of the stored fuel before it can used by the docked ships. Due to the unheated fuel tanks limited capability, the base can only operate for four to five weeks before the temperatures begin to affect the stored fuel. The existing jetty underwent repair. During the COVID-19 pandemic, construction was delayed and the road connecting the base to the nearest airport washed away. The road had to be rebuilt and was again operational in 2022. Furthermore, the federal government entered into an agreement with the Nunavut government preventing any icebreaking in the area to maintain the local population's access to sea ice and protect local wildlife.

=== 2022 Auditor General's report ===
In 2022, a report of the Auditor General of Canada found that "the Nanisivik Naval Facility will be of much more limited use than first expected". The report, which investigated wider problems related to Canada's Arctic surveillance capacity, noted that the Nanisivik facility will only operate for about four weeks of the year due to decisions taken to scope down the project. Since the fuel tanks will not be heated, vessel refuelling will depend on available commercial facilities or allied support. It was also reported that the Royal Canadian Navy was only expected to begin using the facility in 2025. However, in early 2025 it was reported that facility did not have an opening date, still required a replacement jetty and would need heat to be added to the fuel tanks for the facility to become operational.

=== Shutdown ===
Reports began in May 2026 that the unused base would be shuttered. On 21 May 2026, the Department of National Defence announced the facility would be put in "non-operational caretaker status" and considered for divestment. The Navy cited the extended range of the Harry DeWolf-class offshore patrol vessels, short seasonal operating window, and the additional $200 million required to make the facility operational as reasons for the closure.

== See also ==
- CFS Alert – Canada's other arctic military installation
- CFS Frobisher Bay - former Canadian arctic military installation near Iqaluit, Nunavut
