= CFS Frobisher Bay =

- Location within Canada
- Coordinates: 63°45′00″N 68°33′00″W
- Country: Canada
- Territory: Nunavut

Canadian Forces Station Frobisher Bay, also known as NRS Frobisher Bay, was a military high-frequency direction-finding station located on Baffin Island at what is now Iqaluit, Nunavut. It opened in July 1954 and closed on July 11, 1966.

== See also ==
- CFS Alert
- Nanisivik Naval Facility
