= Nanisivik =

Former company town in Nunavut, Canada

- Company town
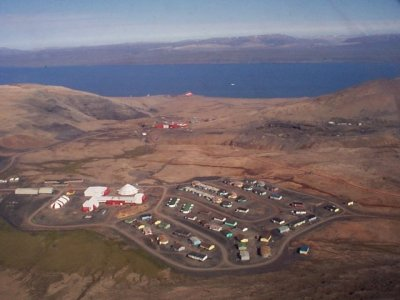
- Aerial view of Nanisivik

- Location within Nunavut Location within Canada
- Coordinates: 73°02′N 84°33′W
- Country: Canada
- Territory: Nunavut
- Region: Qikiqtaaluk
- Electoral district: Quttiktuq

Government
  - MLA: Steven Taqtu

Area (2021)
  - Land: 165.49 km^{2} (63.90 sq mi)
- Highest elevation: 341 m (1,119 ft)
- Lowest elevation: 0 m (0 ft)

Population (2021)
  - Total: 0
- Time zone: UTC−05:00 (EST)
  - Summer (DST): UTC−04:00 (EDT)
- Postal Code: X0A 0X0
- GNBC Code: OALHI
- NTS Map: 048C01

Nanisivik (Inuktitut: ᓇᓂᓯᕕᒃ, lit. 'the place where people find things'; /nəˈniːsɪvɪk/) is a now-abandoned company town which was built in 1975 to support the lead-zinc mining and mineral processing operations for the Nanisivik Mine, in production between 1976 and 2002. The townsite is located just inland from Strathcona Sound, about 20 km (12 mi) east of the community of Arctic Bay in the Canadian territory of Nunavut.

There is a port and dock about 3.7 km (2.3 mi) north of the abandoned mine site, which was used for shipping concentrate from the site, and receiving supplies (73°04′08″N 084°32′57″W). It is used by the Canadian Coast Guard for training.

Nanisivik Airport, located 8 nautical miles (15 km; 9.2 mi) south, was used as the main airport for Arctic Bay until 2010, when the lengthened Arctic Bay Airport took over. The airport is about 19 km (12 mi) directly southeast of Arctic Bay but the road between them is 32 km (20 mi).

== Demographics ==
Federal census population history of Nanisivik
Year	Pop.	±%
1981	261	—
1986	315	+20.7%
1991	294	−6.7%
1996	287	−2.4%
2001	77	−73.2%
2006	0	−100.0%
2011	0	0.00%
2016	0	0.00%
2021	0	0.00%
Source: Statistics Canada

In the 2021 Canadian census conducted by Statistics Canada, Nanisivik had a population of 0, no change from its 2016 population of 0. With a land area of 165.49 km^{2} (63.90 sq mi), it had a population density of 0.0/km^{2} (0.0/sq mi) in 2021.

== Geology ==
The ore deposit resides within dolomite from the Society Cliffs Formation covered with dolomitic shale from the Victor Bay Formation, which together form the Uluksan Group and reside on top of silty shale. The ore is believed to have formed when hot saline water bearing the metal ions of sodium, calcium, chlorine, and sulfate mixed with cooler carbonate-rich brine in the presence of natural gas or methane, which produced hydrogen sulfide through reducing the sulfate. The hydrogen sulfide then reacted with the metals to form the sulfides of marcasite (FeS2), pyrite (FeS_{2}), sphalerite ((Zn,Fe)S), and galena (PbS). The Nanisivik deposit once contained 60 million metric tons of pyrite and 12 million tons of lead-zinc ore.

== Mineralogy ==
The Nanisivik mine is known for its diversity of unusual pyrite pseudomorphs after marcasite and pyrrhotite.

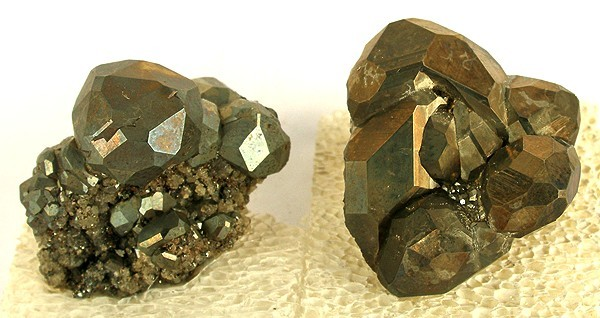
Nanisivik Pyrite is a pseudomorph unique to this location.

== History ==
=== Ore discovery ===
Arthur English was a prospector on CGS Arctic, the steamship of Captain Joseph-Elzéar Bernier, as part of the Geological Survey of Canada in 1910. They wintered the 1910-11 winter in Arctic Bay (20 km (12 mi) south-east of Nanisivik). In 1911 Arthur English published his discovery of a "very large body of ore" at Nanisivik.

=== Development ===
J.F. Tibbitt and F. McInnes travelled from Churchill, Manitoba to Nanisivik by dog sled (3,000 km [1,900 mi]) and staked their claims in 1937, but were unable to develop them. In 1956 R. G. Blackadar and R. R. H. Lemon published maps of the region for another Geological Survey of Canada. Soon thereafter Texas Gulf Sulfur Company (later Texasgulf Inc., now broken up into bits such as Intrepid Potash) evaluated the region and staked 15 claims. Extensive drilling and exploration over the next decade led to the procurement of heavy equipment in 1970 and bulk metallurgical testing. Mineral Resources International of Calgary, Alberta, traded the rights to a sulphur deposit in Mexico for a long term option on the Strathcona Sound property, which eventually translated into 54% ownership of Nanisivik Mines Limited. Strathcona Mineral Services Limited was hired to run the mine as an independent manager and successfully initiated production.

=== Operation ===
The mine opened in 1976 and yielded primarily zinc, however silver and lead were collected as by-products. It is in 500 m-thick (1,600 ft) permafrost, 700 km (430 mi) north of the Arctic Circle and operated year-round through accumulating ore during the winter and shipping in the summer (July–November). Annual production totalled 125,000 tons of ore, which was sold to European smelters via Belgium.

Conwest Exploration Company Ltd. eventually acquired the mine.

=== Mine closure ===
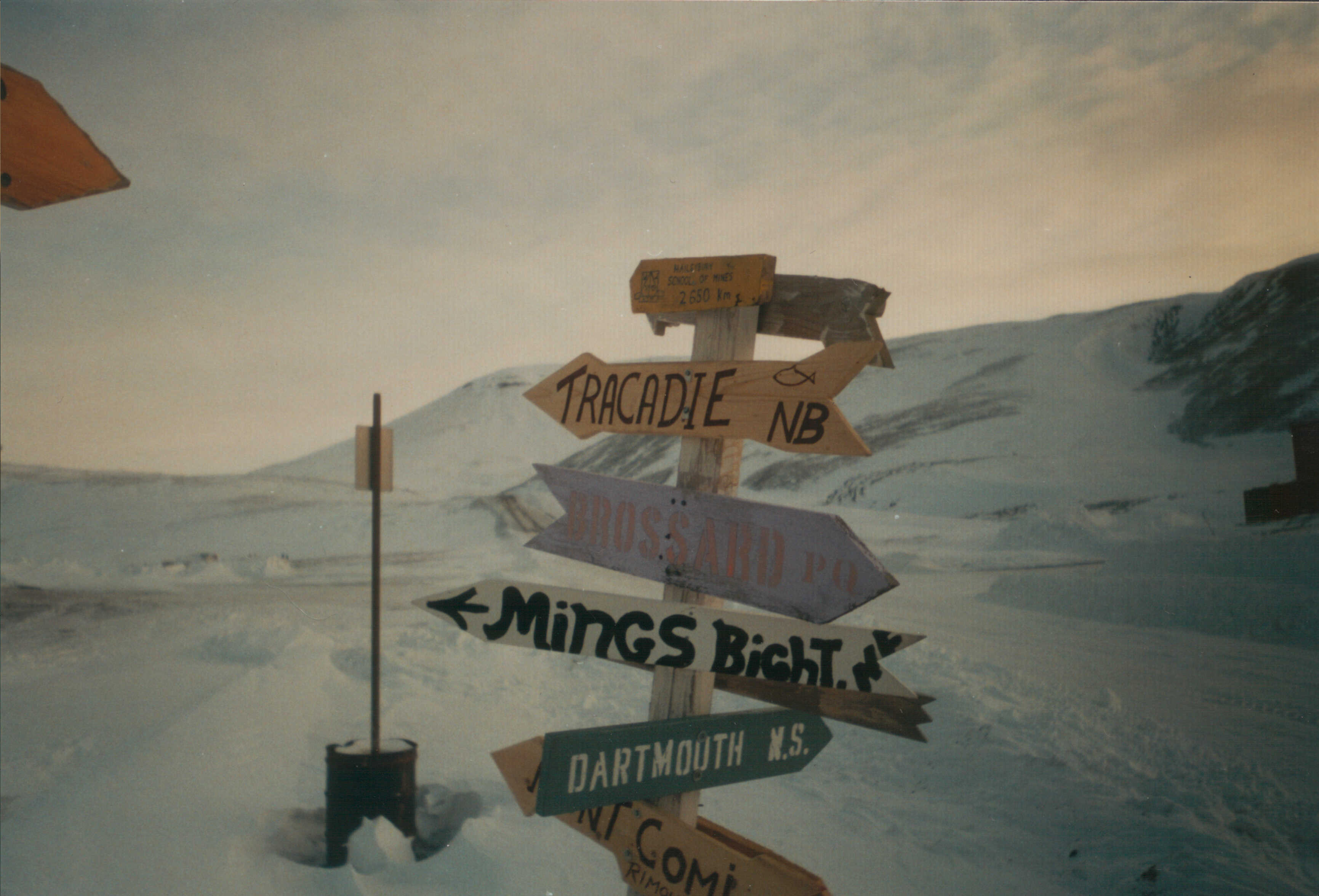
One of three signposts in Nanisivik showing directions to various cities and towns

Since the closure of the mine in 2002, reclamation has been ongoing and the town is abandoned. Residents of Arctic Bay had hoped that the Government of Nunavut would be able to find a new use for the former town site, potentially a trades training centre. They had also hoped to be able to move some of the buildings and equipment to their community. Due to heavy lead-zinc contamination, this was not possible and the homes have been demolished. Local telephone service was discontinued on February 19, 2007, on approval from CRTC.

As of the 2006 census the population was 0, a drop from the 2001 census with a population of 77.

=== Conversion to naval station ===
On August 8, 2007, CBC News reported that Canadian Forces documents showed plans to convert the site into a naval station. The plan, which would turn the former mine's existing port into a deepwater facility, would cost $60 million and it was expected that Prime Minister Stephen Harper would make an announcement during his stop in Resolute.

On August 10, 2007, Harper announced construction of a new docking and refuelling facility in Nanisivik for the Canadian Forces, in an effort to maintain a Canadian presence in Arctic waters during the navigable season (June–October). The choice for Nanisivik as a site was partially based on its location within the eastern entrance to the Northwest Passage, and the existence of a deep-water berthing facility at the site, as well as a "jet-capable" airstrip nearby.

Detailed planning for the project began in August 2007, with environmental studies and assessments being carried out in the summer of 2008. Construction at the site was originally expected to begin in the summer of 2010, with early operating capability available in 2012. The facility was planned to be fully operational by 2015.

Once completed, the naval station will likely be home to the Harry DeWolf-class offshore patrol vessels. These ships have ice-breaking capability and help the government's goal to enforce Canada's sovereignty over the region. These ships will likely allow the Victoria-class submarines to travel in the Canadian Arctic region.

The facility was to have an initial operational capability in 2012, and be fully complete in 2015 but is behind schedule. Development is being delayed because environmental cleanup has been delayed as much as possible by Breakwater Resources Ltd., owned by Nyrstar N.V.

In 2011 and 2012, the government started backing down on the Nanisivik conversion plans, explaining that construction in the far north is too expensive. The station will be primarily used for refuelling Arctic patrol and other government vessels, and construction was expected to begin in 2013, with the station operational by 2016. After repeated delays, construction on the site finally commenced in 2015. The station had been expected to be operational in summer 2019. After numerous delays during construction, as of January 2023 the expected completion is in 2024. According to the Department of National Defence, the main reasons for the frequent delays are rising costs of construction, logistics issues and a climate that limits the annual construction season.

== Geography ==
=== Climate ===
Nanisivik has a tundra climate (a polar climate sub-type under the Köppen climate classification scheme) with long, cold winters and very short, chilly summers that are rarely mild. Early winter tends to be snowiest period of the year, with around 40% of all yearly snowfall falling during this short period.

Climate data for Nanisivik (Nanisivik Airport) Climate ID: 2402730; coordinates 72°59′N 84°37′W; elevation: 641.9 m (2,106 ft); 1981–2010 normals
Month	Jan	Feb	Mar	Apr	May	Jun	Jul	Aug	Sep	Oct	Nov	Dec	Year
Record high humidex	−3.0	1.2	−2.2	−1.2	6.5	14.5	18.4	16.7	9.0	1.2	−6.3	−1.3	18.4
Record high °C (°F)	−2.0 (28.4)	2.0 (35.6)	−3.0 (26.6)	−0.5 (31.1)	7.0 (44.6)	18.5 (65.3)	18.2 (64.8)	17.0 (62.6)	8.5 (47.3)	2.0 (35.6)	−6.0 (21.2)	−4.4 (24.1)	18.5 (65.3)
Mean daily maximum °C (°F)	−26.8 (−16.2)	−27.2 (−17.0)	−24.7 (−12.5)	−16.6 (2.1)	−7.6 (18.3)	2.2 (36.0)	7.5 (45.5)	3.9 (39.0)	−3.3 (26.1)	−11.3 (11.7)	−19.8 (−3.6)	−23.6 (−10.5)	−12.3 (9.9)
Daily mean °C (°F)	−29.6 (−21.3)	−29.9 (−21.8)	−27.6 (−17.7)	−19.8 (−3.6)	−10.3 (13.5)	−0.1 (31.8)	5.1 (41.2)	1.7 (35.1)	−5.0 (23.0)	−13.6 (7.5)	−22.5 (−8.5)	−26.3 (−15.3)	−14.8 (5.4)
Mean daily minimum °C (°F)	−32.4 (−26.3)	−32.3 (−26.1)	−30.1 (−22.2)	−22.9 (−9.2)	−13.0 (8.6)	−2.4 (27.7)	2.7 (36.9)	−0.5 (31.1)	−6.7 (19.9)	−15.8 (3.6)	−24.9 (−12.8)	−28.7 (−19.7)	−17.2 (1.0)
Record low °C (°F)	−48.5 (−55.3)	−53.0 (−63.4)	−47.5 (−53.5)	−42.0 (−43.6)	−28.3 (−18.9)	−14.0 (6.8)	−6.0 (21.2)	−10.0 (14.0)	−19.5 (−3.1)	−35.0 (−31.0)	−39.4 (−38.9)	−45.5 (−49.9)	−53.0 (−63.4)
Record low wind chill	−62.9	−72.3	−67.0	−54.8	−39.4	−24.9	−12.8	−21.0	−30.3	−50.0	−53.5	−60.6	−72.3
Average precipitation mm (inches)	5.4 (0.21)	5.1 (0.20)	8.4 (0.33)	10.9 (0.43)	24.0 (0.94)	25.2 (0.99)	45.7 (1.80)	45.0 (1.77)	38.4 (1.51)	37.4 (1.47)	18.1 (0.71)	7.3 (0.29)	270.9 (10.67)
Average rainfall mm (inches)	0.0 (0.0)	0.0 (0.0)	0.0 (0.0)	0.0 (0.0)	0.1 (0.00)	6.7 (0.26)	37.0 (1.46)	29.2 (1.15)	4.4 (0.17)	0.0 (0.0)	0.0 (0.0)	0.0 (0.0)	77.3 (3.04)
Average snowfall cm (inches)	5.4 (2.1)	5.2 (2.0)	8.4 (3.3)	11.2 (4.4)	24.0 (9.4)	17.7 (7.0)	8.5 (3.3)	15.0 (5.9)	32.3 (12.7)	38.2 (15.0)	17.9 (7.0)	7.5 (3.0)	191.3 (75.3)
Average precipitation days (≥ 0.2 mm)	4.4	4.6	6.2	5.7	9.6	8.8	12.4	12.6	13.3	14.2	8.4	6.3	106.5
Average rainy days (≥ 0.2 mm)	0.0	0.0	0.0	0.0	0.0	2.2	10.4	8.1	1.7	0.0	0.0	0.0	22.3
Average snowy days (≥ 0.2 cm)	4.4	4.6	6.2	5.8	9.6	7.1	3.0	5.4	12.1	14.3	8.5	6.4	87.3
Source: Environment and Climate Change Canada Canadian Climate Normals 1981–2010
