= Arctic Bay Airport =

Airport in Nunavut, Canada

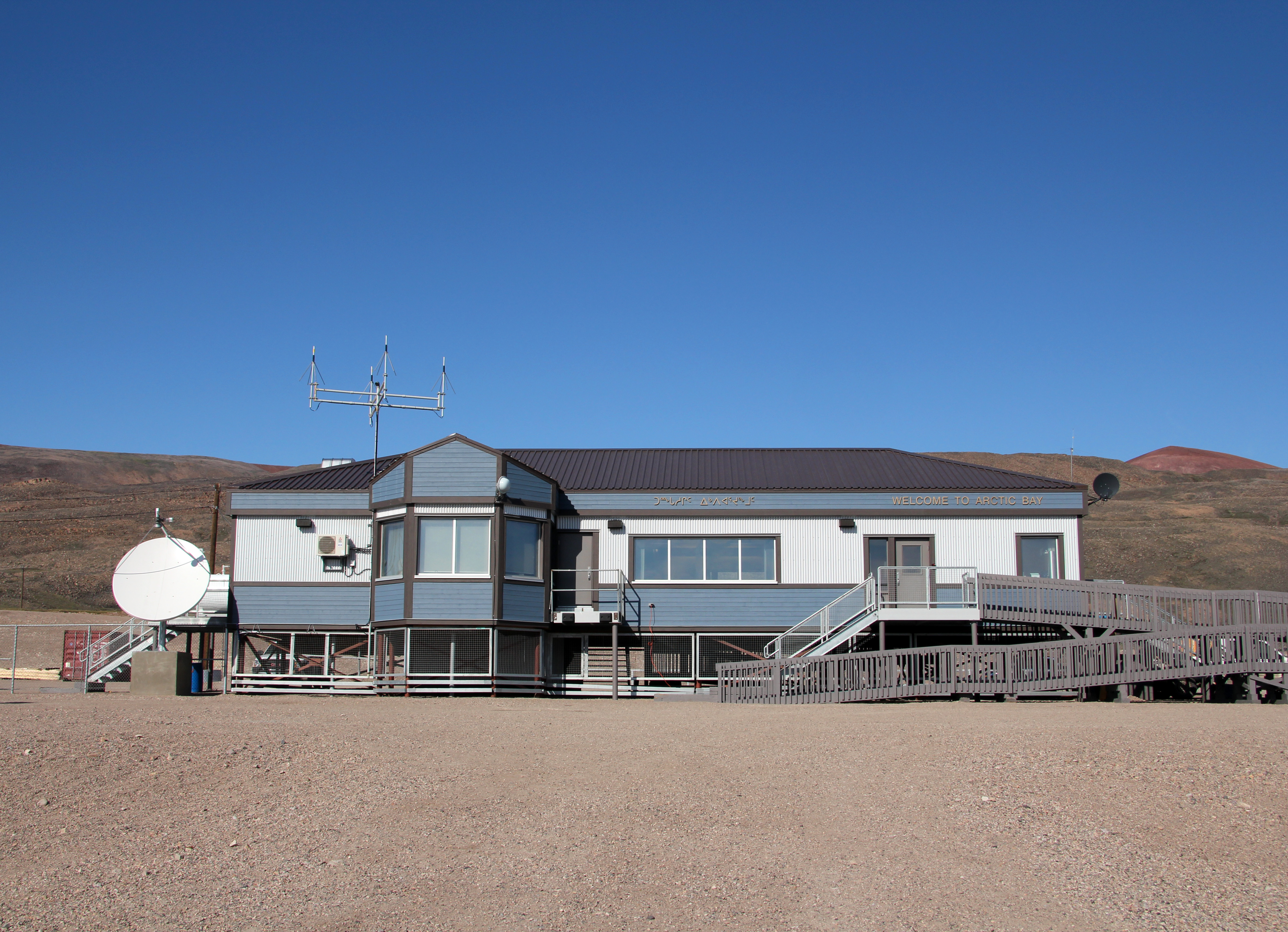
- Arctic Bay terminal, constructed 2010

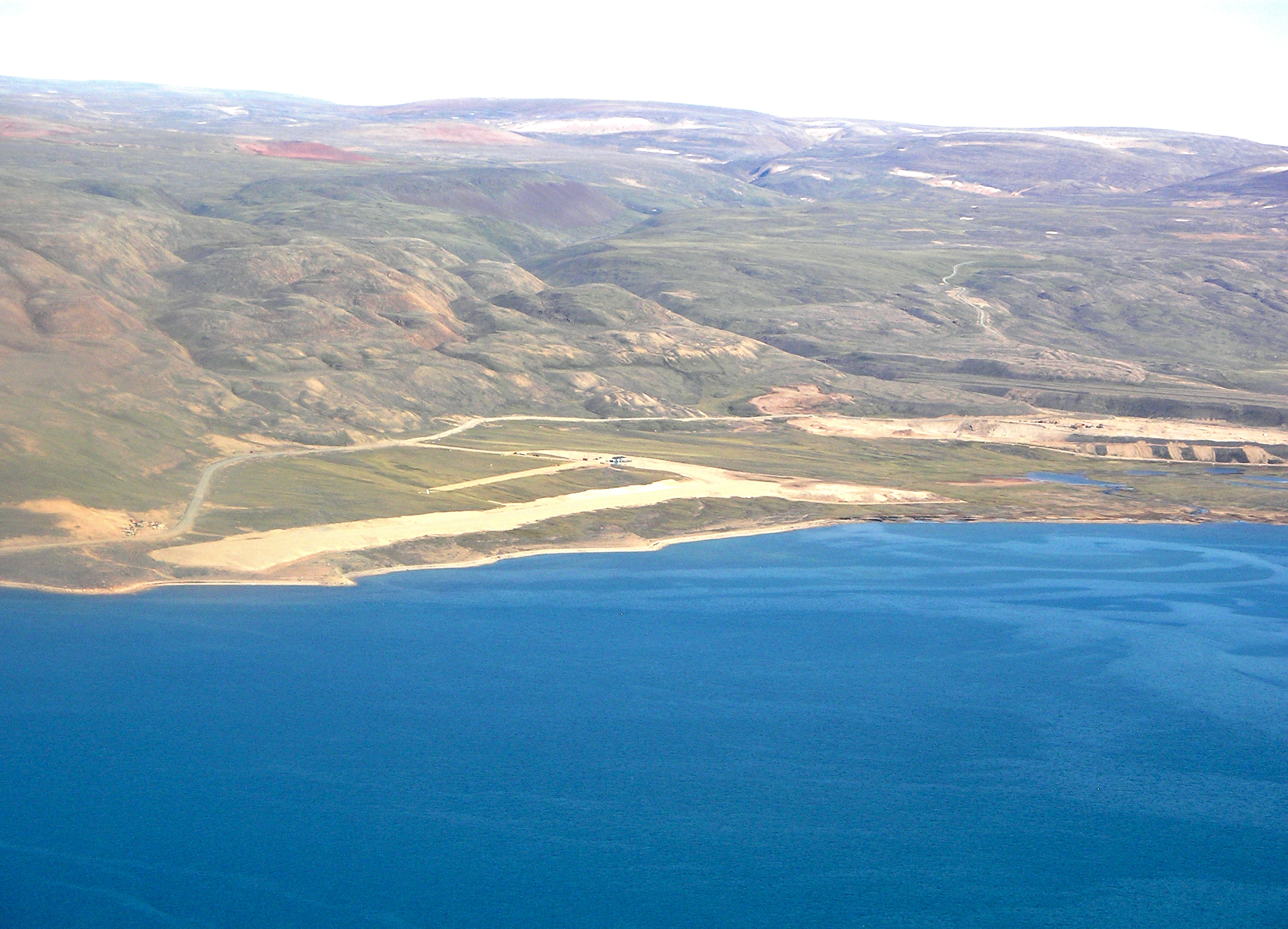
- The newer and longer runway
- IATA: YAB; ICAO: CYAB; WMO: 71592

Summary
- Airport type: Private
- Operator: Government of Nunavut
- Location: Arctic Bay
- Time zone: EST (UTC−05:00)
  - Summer (DST): EDT (UTC−04:00)
- Elevation AMSL: 72 ft / 22 m
- Coordinates: 73°00′23″N 085°02′50″W

Map
- Location in Nunavut CYAB (Canada)

Runways
Direction	Length		Surface
Direction	ft	m	Surface
13/31	3,935	1,199	Gravel
- Source: Canada Flight Supplement, Environment Canada

Arctic Bay Airport (IATA: YAB, ICAO: CYAB) is an airport located 3 nautical miles (5.6 km; 3.5 mi) southeast of Arctic Bay, Nunavut, Canada. Until January 12, 2010 Nanisivik Airport, about 25 km (16 mi) from Arctic Bay, was used for scheduled flights. On January 13, 2010, First Air transferred all air services to Arctic Bay's newly expanded airport with service to Iqaluit and Resolute Bay. Niore Iqalukjuak, mayor of Arctic Bay, said that the move would save community members $40 for the one way taxi ride. At the same time the Government of Nunavut said that the move would save $600,000 a year because of not having to keep the all-weather road clear.

The original runway at 1,500 ft (457 m) was the shortest in Nunavut. It was decommissioned in 2010 and is now marked off with two "X"s on either ends. A new runway measuring 3,935 ft (1,199 m) was built to the south, along with a new airport terminal. The airport can currently handle general aviation to smaller turboprop aircraft.

== Airlines and destinations ==
Airlines	Destinations
Canadian North	Iqaluit, Pond Inlet, Resolute
