= Arctic Bay =

Arctic Bay Ikpiarjuk ᐃᒃᐱᐊᕐᔪᒃ (Inuktitut)
- Hamlet
- Hamlet of Arctic Bay
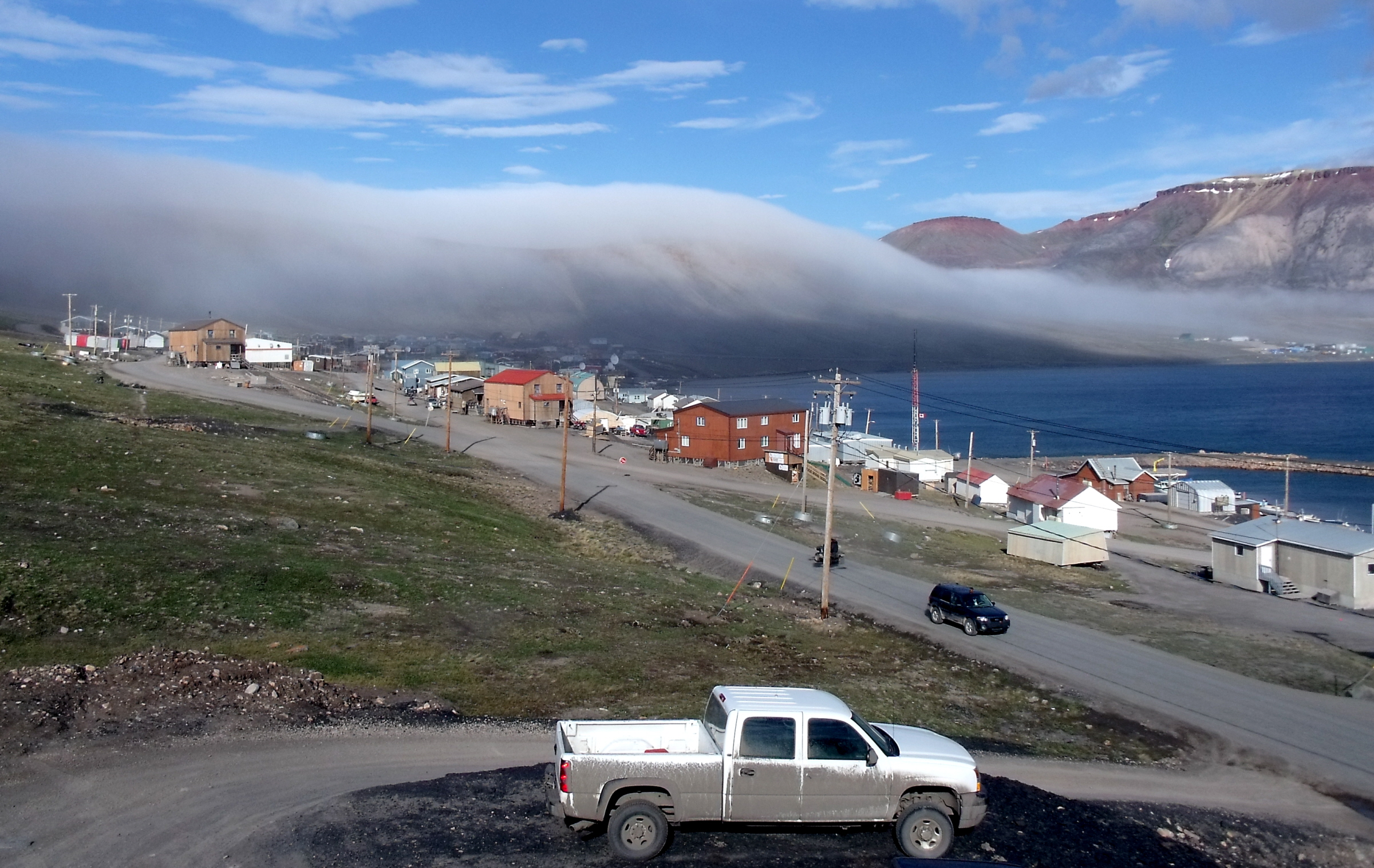

- Logo

- Location within Nunavut Location within Canada
- Coordinates: 73°02′N 85°10′W
- Country: Canada
- Territory: Nunavut
- Region: Qikiqtaaluk
- Electoral district: Quttiktuq

Government
  - Type: Hamlet
  - Mayor: Moses Oyukuluk
  - Senior Administrative Officer: Joeli Qamanirq
  - MLA: Steven Taqtu

Area (2021)
  - Total: 245.16 km^{2} (94.66 sq mi)
- Elevation: 31 m (102 ft)

Population (2021)
  - Total: 994
  - Density: 4.05/km^{2} (10.5/sq mi)
- Time zone: UTC−05:00 (EST)
  - Summer (DST): UTC−04:00 (EDT)
- Postal code: X0A 0A0
- Area code: 867

Arctic Bay (Inuktitut: ᐃᒃᐱᐊᕐᔪᒃ, romanized: Ikpiarjuk, lit. 'the pocket') is an Inuit hamlet located in the northern part of the Borden Peninsula on Baffin Island in the Qikiqtaaluk Region of Nunavut, Canada. Arctic Bay is located in the Eastern Time Zone although it is quite close to the time zone boundary. The predominant languages are Inuktitut and English. Arctic Bay is notable for being the birthplace of the former Premier of Nunavut and, as of 2021, the Commissioner of Nunavut, Eva Aariak. It is the northernmost public community in Canada not formed from forced relocation.

The community is served by annual supply sealift, and by Arctic Bay Airport. There is also a road connecting it to Nanisivik, a former mining community just inland that is now closed.

== History ==
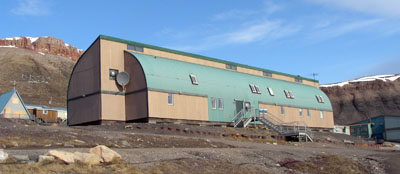
The Arctic Bay Health Centre

The Arctic Bay area has been occupied for nearly 5000 years by Inuit migrating from the west. In 1872, a European whaling ship, the Arctic, captained by Willie Adams, passed through and gave the area its English name.

In September 1926, the Hudson's Bay Company (HBC) established a fur trade post at Arctic Bay, originally called Tukik, but closed the next year. In 1931, the Tukik post was reopened and renamed to Arctic Bay in 1936.

In 1959, the HBC post became part of its Northern Stores Department. HBC divested this department in 1987 to The North West Company, which still operates a Northern Store at Arctic Bay.

When the nearby mining town of Nanisivik closed in 2006, residents of Arctic Bay had hoped to boost their housing and public facilities with buildings relocated from Nanisivik, but those hopes were dashed due to lead-zinc contamination. However, a church was relocated from Nanisivik to Arctic Bay in April 2007.

On 10 August 2007, Prime Minister Stephen Harper announced the creation of Nanisivik Naval Facility, to reinforce Canadian presence in the Arctic. The original plans have been downgraded after geotechnical problems increased the cost; it will now operate for four months a year as a refuelling station, primarily for the Harry DeWolf-class Arctic patrol ships. Construction began in August 2014 and the facility is planned to be fully operational by 2025.

In October 2020, clothing manufacturer Canada Goose and Canadian actor Ryan Reynolds announced the donation of over 300 repurposed parkas and boots to K–12 students at the Inuujaq School in Arctic Bay. The donation came after a tweet from activist Koonoo Han, who had grown up in the community, drawing attention to the needs of the community.

== Geography ==
The hamlet is located in the western part of the Borden Peninsula, on the small namesake bay. The Inuktitut name for Arctic Bay is Ikpiarjuk which means "the pocket" in English. This name describes the high hills that surround the almost landlocked bay. To the southeast, the flat-topped King George V Mountain, at nearly 600 metres (2,000 ft) high, dominates the landscape of the hamlet.

=== Climate ===
Arctic Bay experiences a tundra climate (Köppen: ET) like most northern Canadian territories at low elevations, with long, very cold winters and short, cool to cold summers. July is the only month with an average low temperature above freezing. Its climate does not differ from the more severe subarctic climates except for the practically non-existent summer (even Svalbard, an island to the north, has much warmer summers). Even in summer, the average temperature at dawn can be below freezing. The amount of precipitation is of a desert climate, below 250 mm (9.8 in), and the days of snow is comparable to a coastal city of a lake or sea in the middle latitudes, but low for the location. Most precipitation is between summer and early fall.

Ice breakup on Arctic Bay occurs in mid-July, with freeze-up early October.

With the thawing process of permafrost, some communities such as Arctic Bay may be affected by flooding due to the melting of sea ice and erosion due to the mechanical process of temperature changes and their own variation.

Climate data for Nanisivik (Nanisivik Airport) Climate ID: 2402730; coordinates 72°59′N 84°37′W; elevation: 641.9 m (2,106 ft); 1981–2010 normals
| Month | Jan | Feb | Mar | Apr | May | Jun | Jul | Aug | Sep | Oct | Nov | Dec | Year |
|---|---|---|---|---|---|---|---|---|---|---|---|---|---|
| Record high humidex | −3.0 | 1.2 | −2.2 | −1.2 | 6.5 | 14.5 | 18.4 | 16.7 | 9.0 | 1.2 | −6.3 | −1.3 | 18.4 |
| Record high °C (°F) | −2.0 (28.4) | 2.0 (35.6) | −3.0 (26.6) | −0.5 (31.1) | 7.0 (44.6) | 18.5 (65.3) | 18.2 (64.8) | 17.0 (62.6) | 8.5 (47.3) | 2.0 (35.6) | −6.0 (21.2) | −4.4 (24.1) | 18.5 (65.3) |
| Mean daily maximum °C (°F) | −26.8 (−16.2) | −27.2 (−17.0) | −24.7 (−12.5) | −16.6 (2.1) | −7.6 (18.3) | 2.2 (36.0) | 7.5 (45.5) | 3.9 (39.0) | −3.3 (26.1) | −11.3 (11.7) | −19.8 (−3.6) | −23.6 (−10.5) | −12.3 (9.9) |
| Daily mean °C (°F) | −29.6 (−21.3) | −29.9 (−21.8) | −27.6 (−17.7) | −19.8 (−3.6) | −10.3 (13.5) | −0.1 (31.8) | 5.1 (41.2) | 1.7 (35.1) | −5.0 (23.0) | −13.6 (7.5) | −22.5 (−8.5) | −26.3 (−15.3) | −14.8 (5.4) |
| Mean daily minimum °C (°F) | −32.4 (−26.3) | −32.3 (−26.1) | −30.1 (−22.2) | −22.9 (−9.2) | −13.0 (8.6) | −2.4 (27.7) | 2.7 (36.9) | −0.5 (31.1) | −6.7 (19.9) | −15.8 (3.6) | −24.9 (−12.8) | −28.7 (−19.7) | −17.2 (1.0) |
| Record low °C (°F) | −48.5 (−55.3) | −53.0 (−63.4) | −47.5 (−53.5) | −42.0 (−43.6) | −28.3 (−18.9) | −14.0 (6.8) | −6.0 (21.2) | −10.0 (14.0) | −19.5 (−3.1) | −35.0 (−31.0) | −39.4 (−38.9) | −45.5 (−49.9) | −53.0 (−63.4) |
| Record low wind chill | −62.9 | −72.3 | −67.0 | −54.8 | −39.4 | −24.9 | −12.8 | −21.0 | −30.3 | −50.0 | −53.5 | −60.6 | −72.3 |
| Average precipitation mm (inches) | 5.4 (0.21) | 5.1 (0.20) | 8.4 (0.33) | 10.9 (0.43) | 24.0 (0.94) | 25.2 (0.99) | 45.7 (1.80) | 45.0 (1.77) | 38.4 (1.51) | 37.4 (1.47) | 18.1 (0.71) | 7.3 (0.29) | 270.9 (10.67) |
| Average rainfall mm (inches) | 0.0 (0.0) | 0.0 (0.0) | 0.0 (0.0) | 0.0 (0.0) | 0.1 (0.00) | 6.7 (0.26) | 37.0 (1.46) | 29.2 (1.15) | 4.4 (0.17) | 0.0 (0.0) | 0.0 (0.0) | 0.0 (0.0) | 77.3 (3.04) |
| Average snowfall cm (inches) | 5.4 (2.1) | 5.2 (2.0) | 8.4 (3.3) | 11.2 (4.4) | 24.0 (9.4) | 17.7 (7.0) | 8.5 (3.3) | 15.0 (5.9) | 32.3 (12.7) | 38.2 (15.0) | 17.9 (7.0) | 7.5 (3.0) | 191.3 (75.3) |
| Average precipitation days (≥ 0.2 mm) | 4.4 | 4.6 | 6.2 | 5.7 | 9.6 | 8.8 | 12.4 | 12.6 | 13.3 | 14.2 | 8.4 | 6.3 | 106.5 |
| Average rainy days (≥ 0.2 mm) | 0.0 | 0.0 | 0.0 | 0.0 | 0.0 | 2.2 | 10.4 | 8.1 | 1.7 | 0.0 | 0.0 | 0.0 | 22.3 |
| Average snowy days (≥ 0.2 cm) | 4.4 | 4.6 | 6.2 | 5.8 | 9.6 | 7.1 | 3.0 | 5.4 | 12.1 | 14.3 | 8.5 | 6.4 | 87.3 |
Source: Environment and Climate Change Canada Canadian Climate Normals 1981–2010

== Demographics ==
In the 2021 Canadian census conducted by Statistics Canada, Arctic Bay had a population of 994 living in 218 of its 239 total private dwellings, a change of 14.5% from its 2016 population of 868. With a land area of 245.16 km^{2} (94.66 sq mi), it had a population density of 4.1/km^{2} (10.5/sq mi) in 2021.

Federal census population history of Arctic Bay

| Year | Pop. | ±% |
|---|---|---|
| 1976 | 391 | — |
| 1981 | 375 | −4.1% |
| 1986 | 477 | +27.2% |
| 1991 | 543 | +13.8% |
| 1996 | 639 | +17.7% |

| Year | Pop. | ±% |
|---|---|---|
| 2001 | 646 | +1.1% |
| 2006 | 690 | +6.8% |
| 2011 | 823 | +19.3% |
| 2016 | 868 | +5.5% |
| 2021 | 994 | +14.5% |

Source: Statistics Canada

== Recreation ==
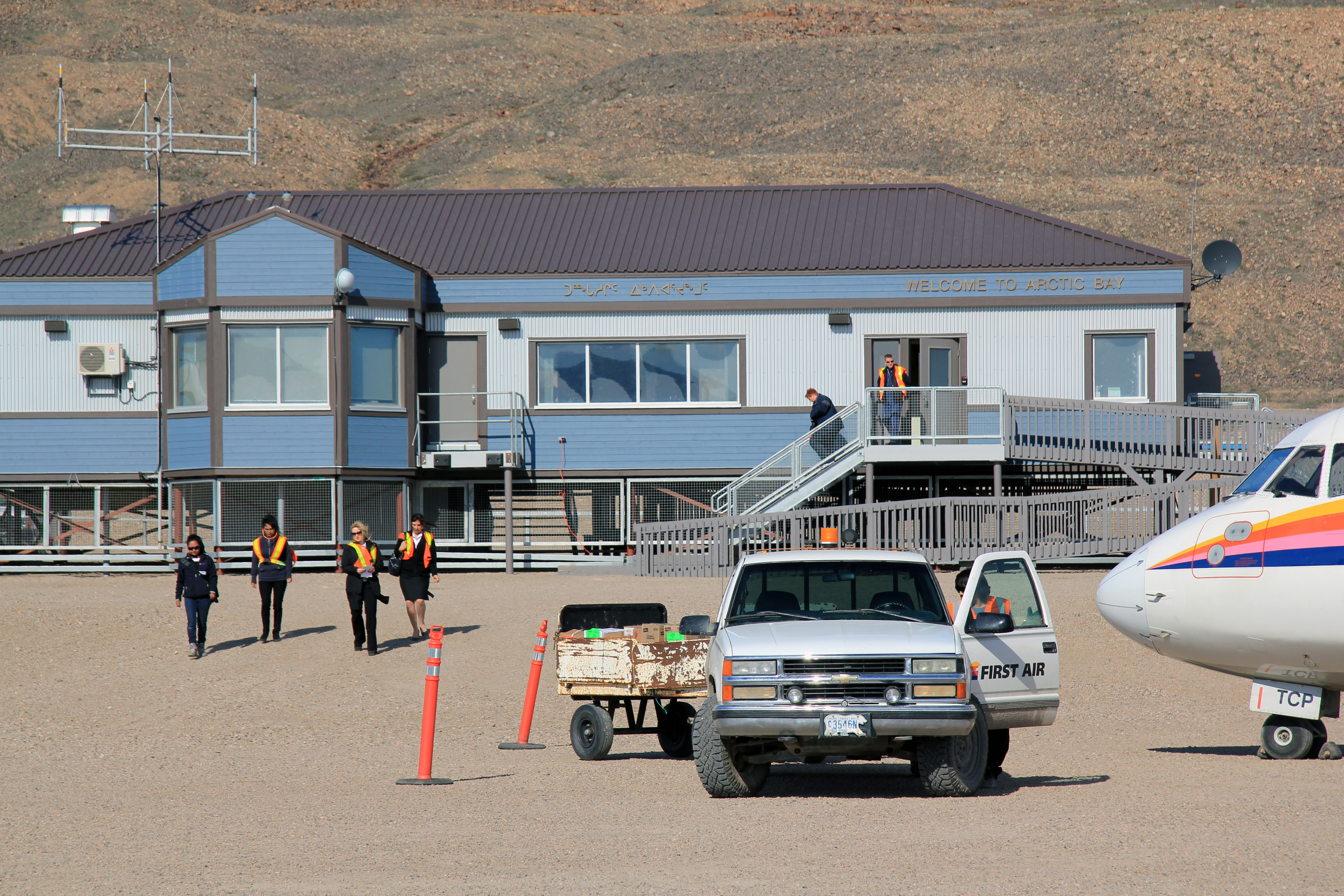
Arctic Bay Airport Terminal

Arctic Bay is host to multiple recreational events and institutions.

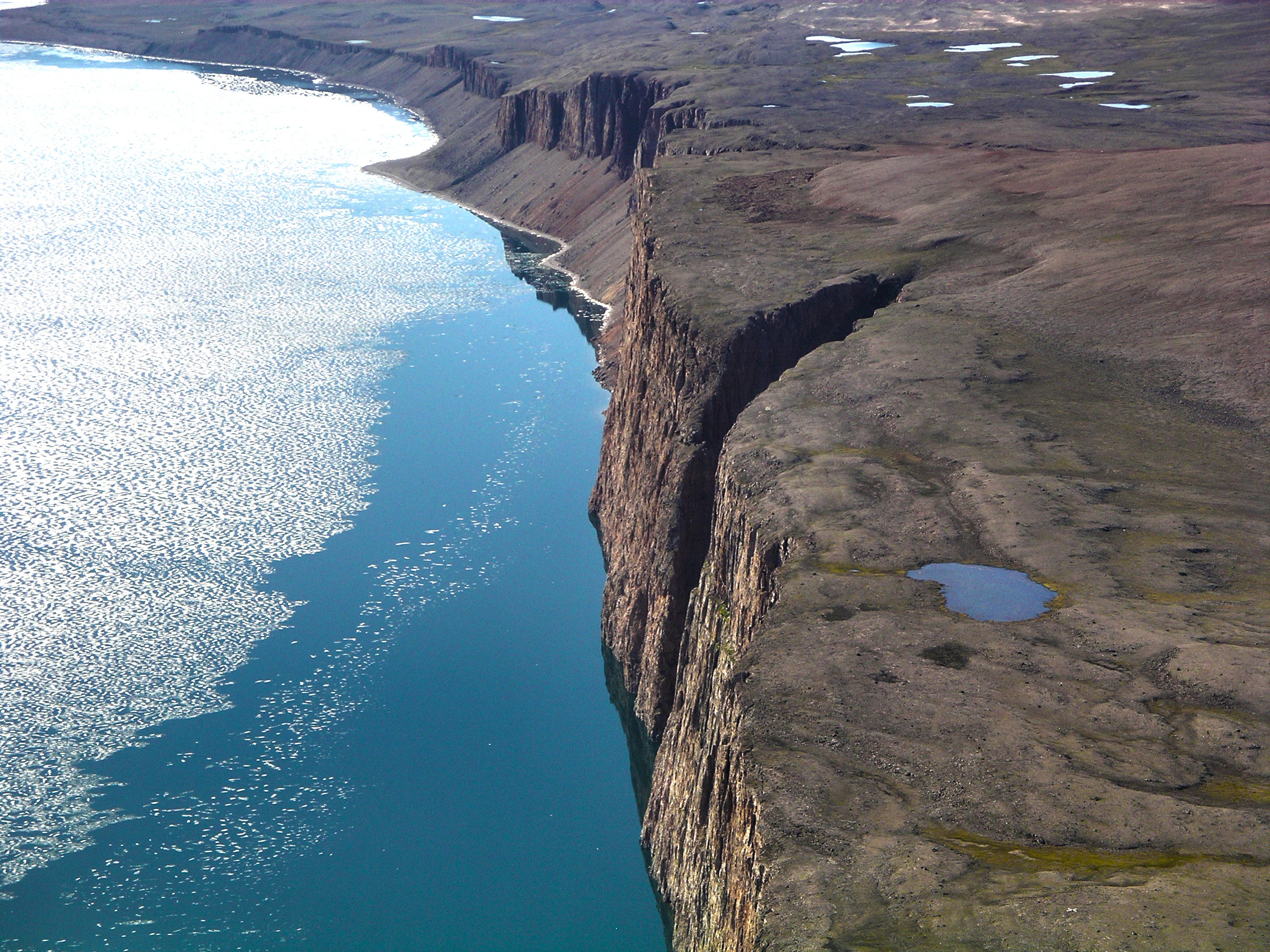
Cliffs near Arctic Bay

The Royal Canadian Army Cadets meet three times a week. This is a program under the purview of the Department of National Defence. Youth aged 12 and up are welcome to join and take part in a variety of activities. The cadets regularly practice marksmanship and do a variety of outdoor activities including hiking, camping, orienteering and the biathlon.

For adults, there are several sports teams and activities that meet regularly at the gym attached to the school. Basketball, soccer, volleyball and hockey are the most popular activities. There is a hockey rink that is open to the public during the winter months. There is also a community art class hosted every Thursday evening.

The Youth Council is actively involved in recreation. They run an assortment of events and activities for the community. They have opened up a CAP (community access point) site at a local church hall for community internet use. Aside from almost daily internet access, this hall is also used weekly for the community Elders to gather and socialize. Various other activities and classes take place here.

The local Community Hall, also known as the Sea Hall, is host to a variety of recreational activities.

Outdoor activities are common. While some residents maintain the traditional skills of their ancestors, most now hunt with guns. Tents are still hand made and used frequently during the summer months. Ice fishing is a common activity during the winter months. Seal and narwhal hunting are quite common to supplement food and clothing.

Common Canadian events also take place in Arctic Bay, such as the Terry Fox Run, which is particularly popular.

The area is popular for sport hunters coming to hunt polar bears although this may change with the listing of the polar bear as a threatened species. Former mayor Andrew Taqtu is well known for his preservation of traditional hunting skills as shown on a BBC film A Boy Among Polar Bears.

=== Midnight Sun Marathon ===
Arctic Bay was home to the Midnight Sun Marathon, one of the northernmost contests held in the world.

== Transportation ==
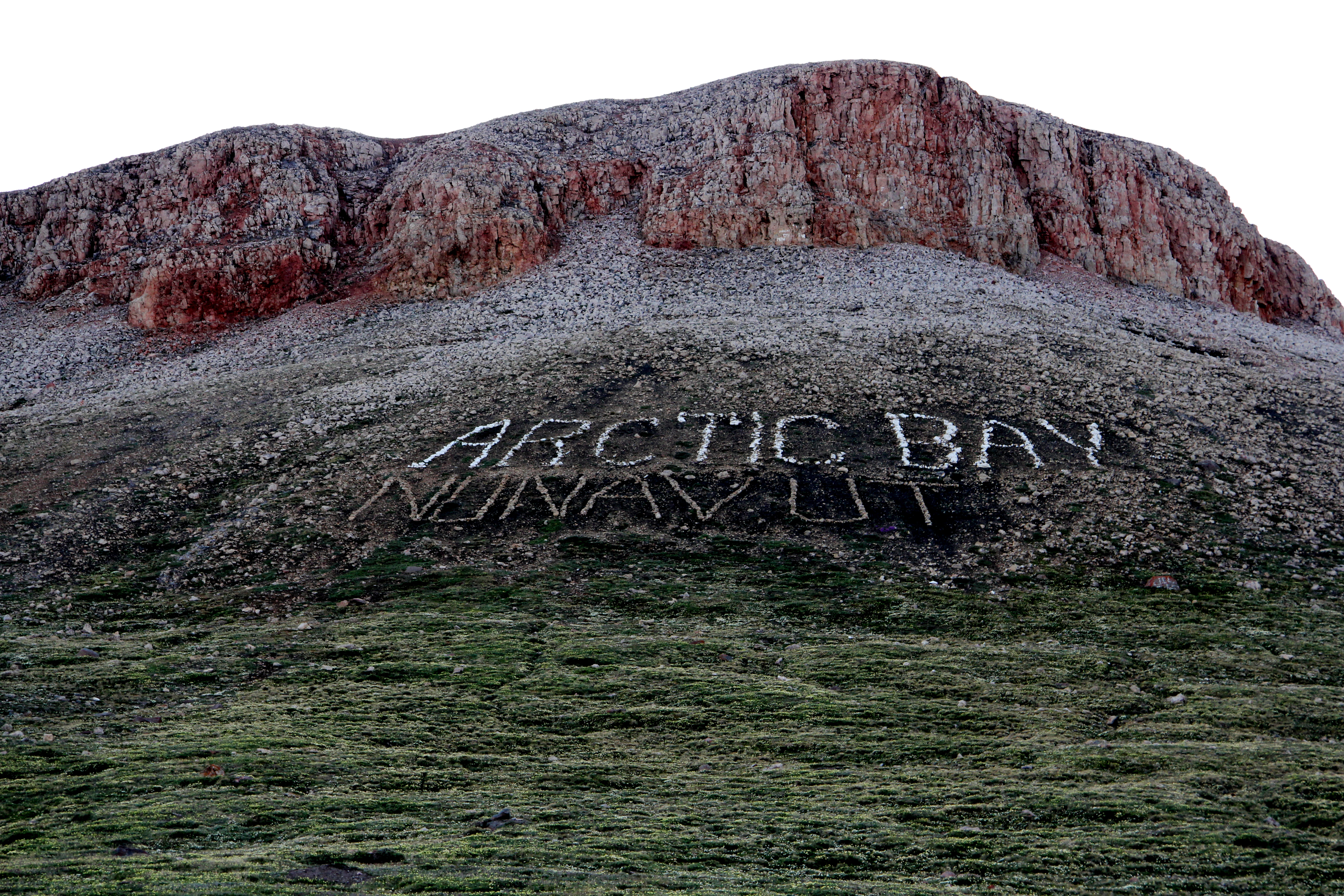
Arctic Bay Welcome Sign

Scheduled flights to and from Arctic Bay arrive at Arctic Bay Airport. This airport was certified in 2011 after completing major construction of the runway and a new terminal building. Currently, regular flights to the Arctic Bay are available through Canadian North from Iqaluit and Resolute.

Prior to the existence of this airport, Twin Otter aircraft would use the main street leading into the town as a landing strip or used the Nanisivik Airport.

== Education ==
The community is served by a single K–12 school, Inuujaq School, that has an enrolment of around 200 students. There is also a Nunavut Arctic College host site where the Nunavut Teacher Education Program (NTEP) is being taught. In 2009 many of the NTEP graduates, who are locals, will become teachers in levels from kindergarten to grade 7. As the only outsiders in the community are government workers, the student population is almost entirely Inuit and the first language spoken is Inuktitut.

Like most high schools in Nunavut, Inuujaq uses the Alberta educational curriculum. However, one challenge faced by educators in this community is that most students read at a lower level than their Alberta counterparts. As with most schools in Nunavut, the school is under the partial authority of the locally elected District Education Authority (DEA) who design policy as well as make decisions regarding discipline, spending, and cultural activities.

== Broadband communications ==
The community has been served by the Qiniq network since 2005. Qiniq is a fixed wireless service to homes and businesses, connecting to the outside world via a satellite backbone. The Qiniq network is designed and operated by SSI Micro. In 2017, the network was upgraded to 4G LTE technology, and 2G-GSM for mobile voice.

== See also ==
- List of municipalities in Nunavut
