= Nanisivik Airport =

Former airport in Nanisivik

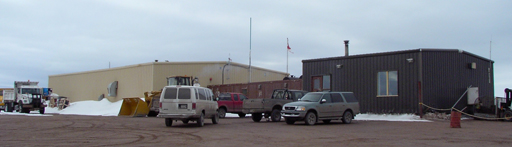
- Nanisivik Airport terminal, June 2006
- IATA: none; ICAO: none

Summary
- Airport type: Public
- Operator: Government of Nunavut
- Serves: Arctic Bay, Nunavut
- Location: Nanisivik
- Time zone: EST (UTC−05:00)
  - Summer (DST): EDT (UTC−04:00)
- Elevation AMSL: 2,106 ft (642 m)
- Coordinates: 72°58′56″N 084°36′49″W

Map
- Location in Nunavut CYSR (Canada)

Runways
Direction	Length		Surface
Direction	ft	m	Surface
11/29	6,400	1,951	Gravel

Statistics (2010)
- Aircraft movements: 464
- Source: Canada Flight Supplement; Movements from Statistics Canada.

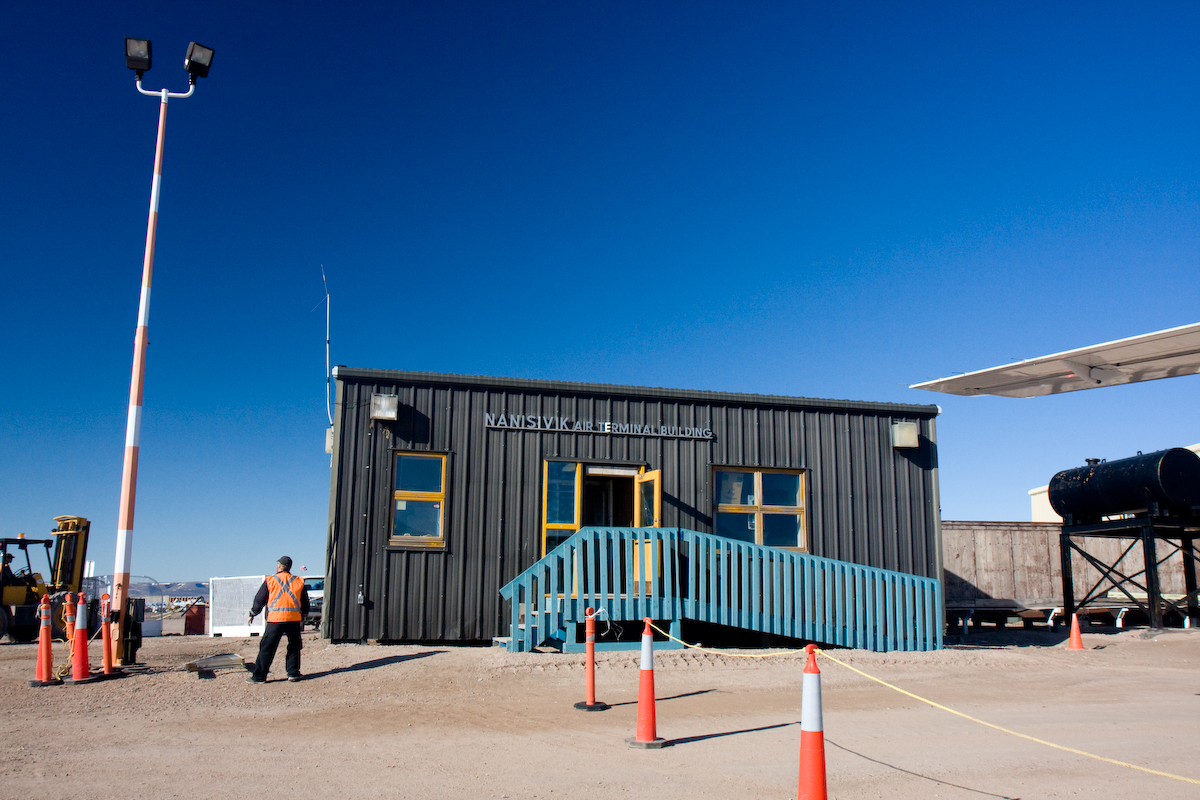
Nanisivik terminal building

Nanisivik Airport, formerly (IATA: YSR, ICAO: CYSR), was located 8 nautical miles (15 km; 9.2 mi) south of Nanisivik, Nunavut, Canada, and was operated by the Government of Nunavut. Although Nanisivik Mine closed in September 2002, the airport was in operation until 2011 and served the community of Arctic Bay. This was due to the small size of Arctic Bay Airport. However, on January 13, 2011, First Air transferred all scheduled air services to Arctic Bay's newly-expanded airport.

The airport was about 19 km (12 mi) directly southeast of Arctic Bay, but the road between them is 32 km (20 mi) and a one way taxi fare was $40.00.

== Conversion to naval station ==
On August 8, 2007, CBC News reported that Canadian Forces documents showed plans to convert the site into a naval station. The plan, which would turn the former mine's existing port into a deepwater facility, would cost $60 million and it was expected that Prime Minister Stephen Harper would make an announcement during his stop in Resolute.

On August 10, 2007, Prime Minister Stephen Harper announced construction of a new docking and refueling facility in Nanisivik for the Canadian Forces, in an effort to maintain a Canadian presence in Arctic waters during the navigable season (June–October). The choice for Nanisivik as a site was partially based on its location within the eastern entrance to the Northwest Passage, and as there is an existing deep-water berthing facility at the site, and a "jet-capable" airstrip nearby.

Detailed planning for the project began in August 2007, with environmental studies and assessments will be being carried out in the summer of 2008. Construction at the site is expected to begin in the summer of 2010, with early operating capability available in 2012. The facility was planned to be fully operational by 2015, but now delayed until at least 2018.

The re-opening of the Nanasivik Airport is unlikely to be needed as a helicopter pad is planned for the naval station site. However the old runway is not marked with an X and could be used as an emergency landing strip.
