= Ice Road Truckers season 1 =

Season of television series

Ice Road Truckers
- Season 1
- No. of episodes: 10

Release
- Original network: History
- Original release: June 17 – August 19, 2007

Season chronology
- Next → Season 2

This is a list of Ice Road Truckers Season 1 episodes.

At the top of the world, there's an outpost like no other... and a job only a few would dare. The mission: To haul critical supplies across 350 miles of frozen lakes to Canada's remote billion-dollar diamond mines. The challenge: to transport 10,000 loads in 60 days—before the road disappears. The rewards are great; the risks even greater. These are the men who make their living on thin ice.

— Thom Beers, opening of the show, season 1

The series premiered on June 17, 2007. Six ice road truckers are introduced, and are described as men driving eighteen-wheelers who haul equipment and supplies from Yellowknife, Canada, across a temporary road composed of portages and frozen lakes, to one of three diamond mines northeast of Yellowknife. The final episode in season one premiered on August 19, 2007.

== Drivers ==
- Hugh 'The Polar Bear' Rowland (born 1957): A very rough-around-the-edges, 20-year veteran of ice-road trucking, based in Kelowna in southern British Columbia. He claims to be known by the ice road trucking community as "The Polar Bear", which he says refers to his overbearing, annoying personality, bearish attitude, stamina, and consistently high number of loads delivered per season. Rowland owns four trucks and drives one; the other three are manned by ice road rookies Drew Sherwood, Todd White, and Rowland's associate and year-round employee Rick Yemm. Rowland's trucks all have the emblem R&R Hoe Service on the doors – the company Rowland owns in Kelowna (actually Winfield, BC).

During the course of Season 1, all three of Rowland's hired drivers end up prematurely leaving the ice road. White was banished for excessive speeding (episode 5), Yemm left following heated disagreements about the working condition of Rowland's trucks (episode 9), and Sherwood left after several vehicle breakdowns (episode 7).

Rowland's truck is called "The Crow's Nest" and is kept in good condition, as was Yemm's truck, besides the heater (as seen throughout the season). The trucks driven by Sherwood and White had a multitude of mechanical problems. After Sherwood's departure, Rowland hired a fourth driver named Danny Reese. In the final episode of the first season, Rowland's luck finally ran out when his truck was sideswiped by another trucker on the ice road, knocking a driving axle off the chassis. He ended up finishing the season in the truck originally driven by Yemm.

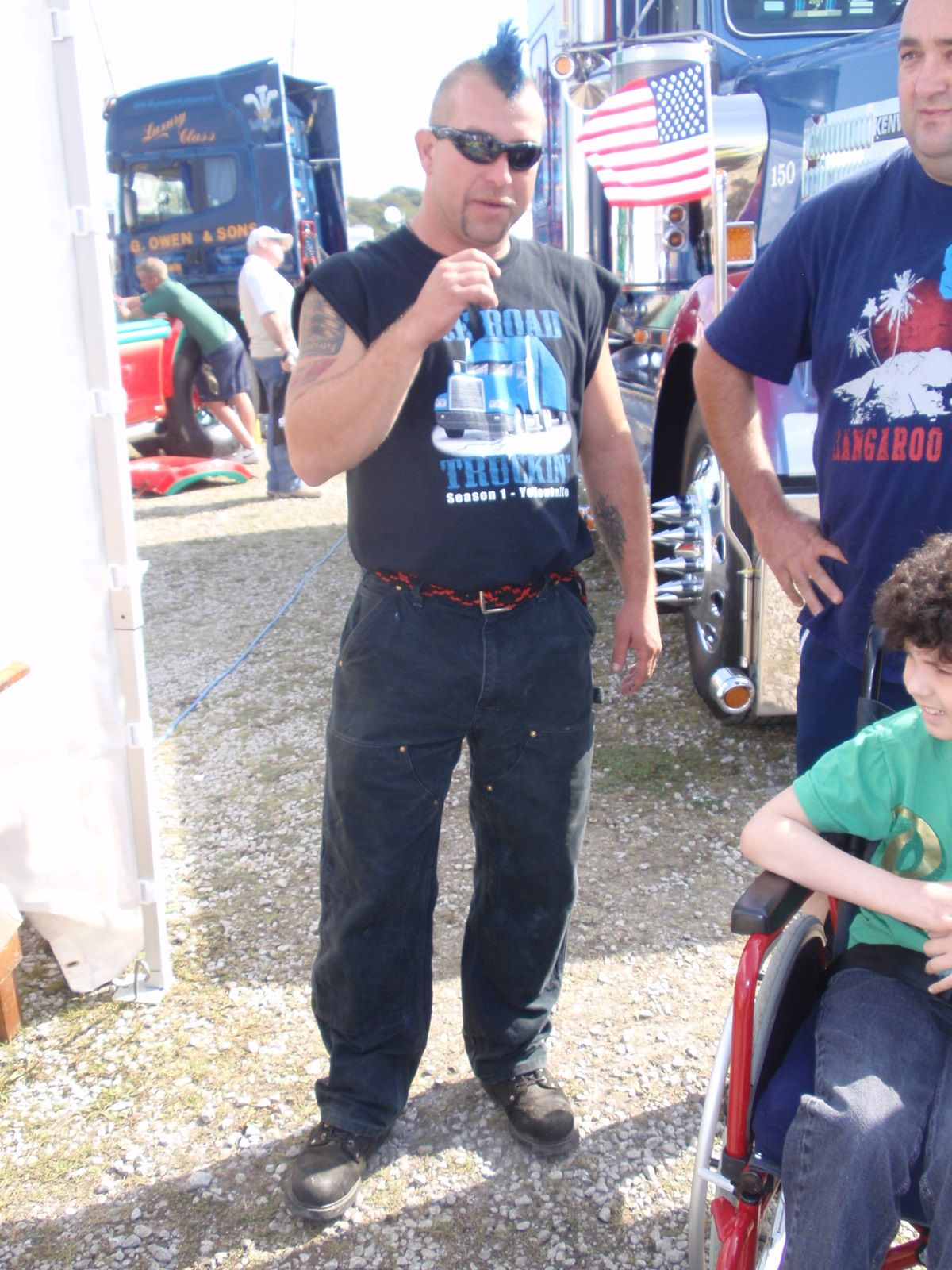
Rick Yemm at Truckfest at Haydock Park Racecourse, England, September 12, 2009.

- Rick Yemm: One of Rowland's employees. This brash, tattooed trucker, also from Kelowna, was in his second year as an ice road trucker during Season 1. In 2006, Yemm was one of the first truckers onto the ice road after it opened when, according to him, the sound of cracking ice was loudest. This stressful experience almost caused him to quit driving the ice road right then and there. He decided to continue, however, remarking, "I was too stupid and too stubborn to quit."

During Season 1, the floor heater in his truck was malfunctioning. This was a major source of tension between Rowland, the truck's owner, and Yemm, who expected Rowland to take care of the problem so that he could continue hauling loads without risking severe frostbite. Yemm ultimately quit and returned home, feeling his friend was not fulfilling his responsibilities to maintain the trucks.

Yemm is known for being hard on the trucks by constantly beating on them. In one episode, Yemm is seen bouncing up and down, pumping the accelerator pedal up and down, and messing with the steering wheel, all the while facing the camera and saying "yee-haw motha fucker!"

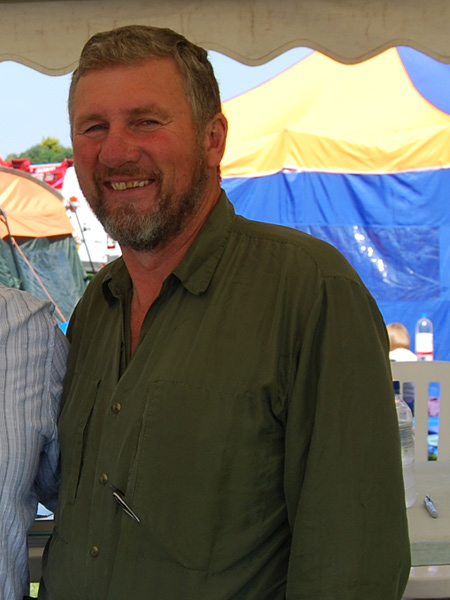
Alex Debogorski at Truckfest South West UK 2011

- Alex Debogorski: A legend in the ice road trucking community, and 2007 marked Debogorski's 26th year as an ice road trucker. Debogorski has 11 children and nine grandchildren, and is a year-round resident of Yellowknife. As stated in Season 1, since he has been a staple driving the ice roads, it is something of a good-luck charm for Debogorski to pull the first load over the ice roads at the beginning of every season. He is such a devout Catholic that by season 9, when he joined long-time rival Hugh Rowland's company in Canada, Debogorski had "The Preacher Man" emblazoned on the side of his truck. (Polish Dębogórski means "coming from or living at Oak Mountain".)

In Season 2, Debogorski had to leave early because of illness (a pulmonary embolism) as seen in episode 8, "A Trucker’s Farewell".

- Jay Westgard: Westgard is also a year-round resident of Yellowknife. Despite his relative youth (he is 25 years old), Westgard is considered by the ice road community as the most talented driver of his generation (as mentioned in the premiere). He began driving trucks at age 16 and owned his first truck by age 18; at the time of his introduction on IRT, Westgard had acquired a reputation as a driver who excels in hauling oversized loads. Because of his experience, he is entrusted with delivering some of the more demanding loads, such as a 48-ton ore scrubber. He also agrees to drive in a convoy (led by Mike Kimball) hauling vital jet fuel to remote Deline—a job most veterans would turn down because the trip is very risky.
- T.J. Tilcox: A 21-year-old ice road rookie, Tilcox is vocal about how he hates the cold and ice, and explains that he is driving on the ice road for the experience, not the money. Tilcox has been trucking since age 16 and decided to try ice road trucking after seeing an advertisement in the newspaper. Early on he struggles with an older truck that lacks heat, but another driver grants Tilcox the use of his brand-new Volvo truck leased to Trinity Transport. On his first run in the new truck, Tilcox gets in an accident before ever hitting the ice road, due to the brake service line's disconnecting from his trailer. Tilcox is ultimately cleared of responsibility and, after a delay, allowed back on the road.

After the accident Tilcox is injured while tying down a load, and several days later experiences severe abdominal pain which becomes so bad that he has to be flown out to receive medical care. Tilcox is able to return to the ice roads after being treated for his injuries. The expense of his treatment is highlighted on the show as a cause of concern for Tilcox. Despite his ordeals, Tilcox gains respect for the job and the people who do it, as well as self-satisfaction for having completed the entire season — a rare feat for a rookie (as mentioned in the finale). He leaves with the respect and admiration of his fellow ice road veterans.

- Drew Sherwood: Sherwood is a veteran trucker but an ice road rookie. He joined Rowland's team after answering an advertisement in the local newspaper. Early on, Sherwood expresses a high degree of confidence that he will have no problems adjusting from highway to ice driving. Rowland considers Sherwood an arrogant rookie and a "one year driver". In the series premiere, Sherwood states: "I have no intention of going into a ditch, bro", after which he soon gets stuck in a ditch later in that episode, a humbling lesson in how much respect the ice road demands.

Sherwood's hard luck, unfortunately, did not stop there, and he was plagued with a frustrating amount of mechanical problems. For starters, he loses his battery box and batteries (resulting in two days lost while a replacement box is fabricated on the spot), suffers a flat tire, and then experiences problems with his truck's on-board computer that forces him to abandon a load on the roadside. Sherwood ends up driving the truck of expelled driver Todd White just to pick up where he left off, yet ends up suffering through problems in that truck, as well (as seen in episode 7). Hugh Rowland, the truck's owner, and Lee Parkinson, Rowland's mechanic, blamed many of these mechanical problems squarely on Sherwood. Sherwood ultimately decides enough is enough and leaves the ice roads to return home.

- Todd White: White (a.k.a. "Chains") worked for Hugh Rowland. He comes from Canada's eastern coast, and is a self-proclaimed trucker and singer. He responded to an ad that Rowland placed and was hired as part of his crew after a seven-year absence from ice road trucking. One of the main reasons White returned to ice road trucking was the need to earn $20,000 to repair his own truck. White was banned from ice road trucking after a speeding violation where he was clocked at 63 km/h (39 mph) in a 40 km/h (25 mph) zone. White appealed, claiming that he missed a speed limit sign, but his appeal was denied. After White left, Sherwood drove his truck.
- Danny Reese: Shortly after Sherwood's departure, Rowland hired Reese to take over the truck vacated by Sherwood after it had finally received a new ECM (as seen in episode 8). Reese quickly noticed that the truck "had its quirks", which included problems with the truck's turbo similar to those Sherwood had experienced with this truck.

== Support personnel ==
- Tom Tweed: Tweed is a dispatcher for Tli Cho Landtran in Yellowknife.
- Rick Fitch: Fitch is a projects manager for Tli Cho Landtran, responsible for scheduling client loads. He is seen responding to several accidents in the series. Fitch has been working on the ice road for over 20 years.
- Ken Murray: Murray is an officer for Secure Check, the organization responsible for security and rules enforcement on the ice road. A first-time speeding ticket can result in a five-day suspension, while severe infractions (including excessive speed) can lead to a driver's being banned for the rest of the season. Truck weights are also checked to ensure they will not over-stress the ice; a driver with an overweight truck can be fined several hundred dollars.
- Lee Parkinson: Parkinson operates a garage in Yellowknife. He is the busiest mechanic in the north (as mentioned in the premiere) and works with his journeyman Mark Chang.
- Neil McDougall: Safety and Compliance Supervisor with Tli Cho Landtran. His job is to set up and hire all the drivers and trucks for the winter road, and to monitor and police the drivers on the road so that rules are not violated and the truckers are not kicked off the road.

== Route and destinations ==
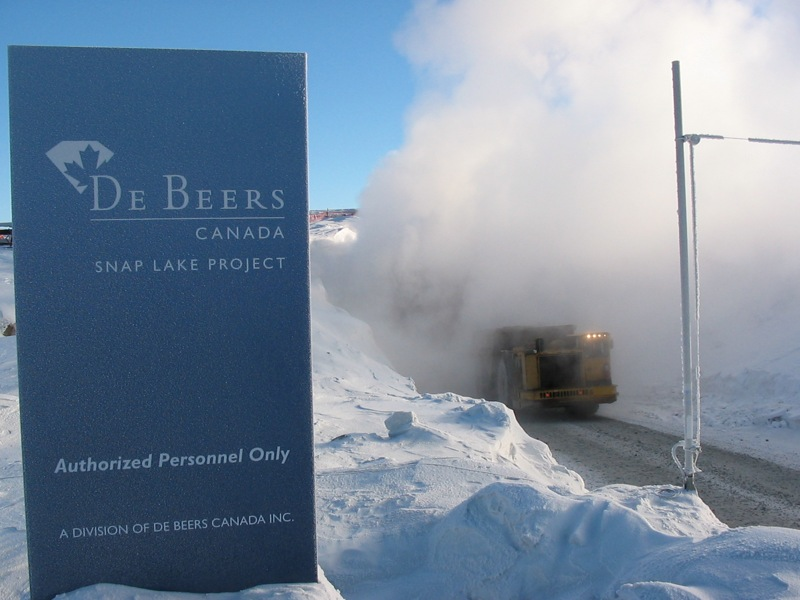
Snap Lake Diamond Mine portal, 40-ton haul truck exiting, winter.

Tibbitt to Contwoyto Winter Road: The first portion of the road is on pavement, following the Ingraham Trail for roughly 60 km (37 mi) until it reaches the shore of Tibbitt Lake.

- Yellowknife, Northwest Territories: Loads are assigned here.
- Dome Lake Camp: A maintenance camp, located 22 mi (35 km) past the start of the ice portion of the winter road. Tilcox is forced to stop here when his injury flares up; he is then airlifted back to Yellowknife for treatment (episode 7).
- Lockhart Lake Rest Stop: Lockhart provides catering and other services for truckers.
- De Beers Snap Lake Diamond Mine: About 220 km (140 mi) northeast of Yellowknife.
- Diavik Diamond Mine: About 300 mi (480 km) north of Yellowknife.
- BHP Ekati Diamond Mine: About 310 km (190 mi) northeast of Yellowknife, the northernmost stop seen on camera during this season. The road continues roughly 125 mi (201 km) past here, serving two defunct mines and stopping at the north end of Contwoyto Lake in Nunavut.
- Colomac Mine: A closed gold mine that was recently cleaned up due to the risk the mine's toxic materials presented to the environment. Now that the cleanup is finished, truckers (including Debogorski) are being called in to haul away equipment.
- Tundra Mine: A gold mine that stopped production in 1968 and is now undergoing environmental cleanup. Equipment from the Colomac Mine is being transferred here to assist workers with the cleanup.
- Deline, Northwest Territories: A small village, on the shore of Great Bear Lake, that depends on jet fuel shipments over the ice road to keep its airport operating.

== Final load counts ==
The season was one of the most successful so far, with 10,922 loads totaling 331,000 tonnes (730 million pounds, or 365,000 U.S. tons) delivered. (Note: The total shown on screen is 662,000,000 pounds, corresponding to 331,000 US tons.)

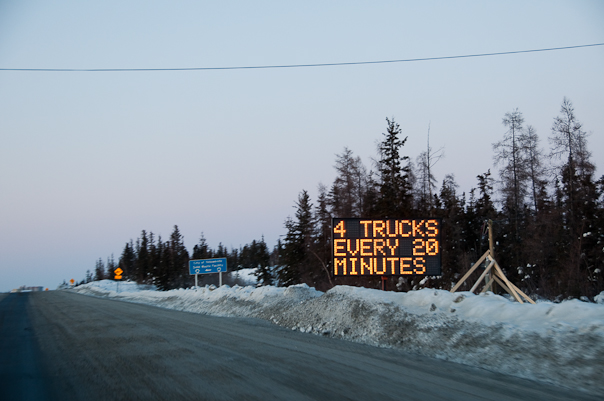
The beginning of the Ingraham Trail leading to the winter road Yellowknife, Northwest Territories

Ice road load count
The count	Rowland	Debogorski	Westgard	Tilcox	Yemm (resigned)	Sherwood (resigned)
Tons	722	648	542	374	369	363
Estimated cash	58.4K	57.0K	57.5K	37.0K	28.0K	19.0K
Loads	37	36	35	23	19	13

== Controversy and changes ==
The mining companies that owned the road where the first season was filmed felt the show portrayed the road in a negative fashion. They believed the show depicted drivers as cowboys making a mad dash for money and taking excessive risks to do so. Also, the companies felt the cameras and filming created distractions for the drivers. As a result, the owners decided not to participate in future seasons of the show, and a new rule for the Tibbitt to Contwoyto Winter Roads was enacted for the 2008 season, prohibiting commercial, media, video, or rolling film cameras either inside or attached to the outside of vehicles. In response, the show's producers located an alternate ice road for season 2.

There were several differences in style among Seasons 1, 2, and 3:

- A main theme of Season 1 was "the dash for the cash", which was rarely mentioned in Season 2, but is a main theme in Season 3.
- In Season 1, companies' insignia on trucks and men's safety helmets were routinely blurred out. In Season 2, they were left visible.

== Episodes ==
No. overall	No. in season	Title	Original release date
1	1	"Ready to Roll"	June 17, 2007
Six ice road truckers are introduced, and ice road truckers are described as men driving eighteen wheelers who haul equipment and supplies from Yellowknife, Canada, across a temporary road composed of portages and frozen lakes, the destination being one of three diamond mines northeast of Yellowknife. Nuna Logistics construction crews began by defining and strengthening a 350-mile (560 km) highway that crosses permafrost and frozen lakes. When the ice over the frozen lakes reaches a thickness considered to be safe, the road is officially opened, and the truckers (beginning with Alex, who hauls the first load as a "good-luck charm") begin carrying loads across what is considered to be the most dangerous road in the world. Highlights include: Drew going into a ditch (although that was not his truck pictured and he did not, in fact, go into a ditch; rather he put a tire off in a snowbank), Alex having to nurse his truck to its destination due to brake trouble, and T.J. making his first ice road run in whiteout conditions.
2	2	"Diamond Mine"	June 24, 2007
The road is stopped due to a traffic jam. Jay hauls a 17-ton water tank, while Hugh and Rick begin a season-long competition to see who can achieve the highest load count. Hugh and Rick deal with mechanical issues and T.J. loses the heat in his truck. At the end of the episode, the load count was shown, now with a tally of cash earned.
3	3	"Dash for the Cash"	July 1, 2007
The road is closed due to a strong Arctic storm. Also, Alex transports a desperately needed piece of equipment to the mine; a 44,000-pound (20,000 kg) diamond-ore crusher.
4	4	"The Big Chill"	July 8, 2007
On the 18th day of the season a 50-ton fuel tanker flips over at the start of the ice road. Jay hauls three giant water purifiers to the De Beers diamond mine. Drew gets back out from the garage, while fellow rookie T.J. weatherproofs his truck with duct tape. A fuel tanker flip on the Ingraham Trail not only blocks traffic but also threatens the Yellowknife River with fuel spillage.
5	5	"Midseason Mayhem"	July 15, 2007
The season is half way over, with 4,000 loads taken but with 6,000 to go. Reckless speeding has led to blowouts on the ice road. More than one driver faces harsh repercussions after being caught speeding - Todd is banned from the ice road after he is clocked going 23 km/h (about 14 mph) over the speed limit. A fuel tanker overturns, blocking traffic and posing a threat to the environment if the fuel contaminates a river that supplies water to an outpost. T.J. leaves the yard with a new rig, and almost immediately has an accident when, after he left the yard, his trailer service line (blue) gladhand was knocked off by a loose box on the catwalk, leaving him with no trailer brakes. Drew ends up in the shop again, due to breakdowns.
6	6	"Driving on Thin Ice"	July 22, 2007
Jay takes a 95,000-pound (43,000 kg) diamond ore scrubber to the De Beers mine, the scrubber had to be delivered or else the mine couldn't go into operation in the fall. T.J.'s accident from the last episode was investigated, and emergency crews responded to a truck that partially went through the ice.
7	7	"The Rookie Challenge"	July 29, 2007
Alex makes a run over a new road to return a mobile housing unit to Yellowknife, and is temporarily stranded when his truck loses traction on loose snow while trying to climb a hill. Drew faces more challenges when his truck runs out of diesel fuel. Despite being refueled, the lines freeze and Drew is forced to wait in his hotel room while they thaw in the garage. After being convinced by his wife to keep trying, he attempts to make another run, but the brakes on his trailer lock up. Drew switches to another trailer, but the brakes on the new one fail too, costing him another day. The final straw is a coolant leak from the radiator. After being told it would take 1–2 days for repairs due to no room in the shop, Drew makes the decision to return home. He receives his pay from Hugh and turns in his driver number. Hugh, on the other hand, nearly misses a run due to a flat tire discovered during an oil change, but is able to get a replacement and hits the road. T.J. requests medical assistance when a previous on-the-job injury flares up, requiring him to be flown from the Dome Lake Camp back to Yellowknife for treatment. Following his release from the hospital, T.J. passes a physical to allow him back on the roads.
8	8	"Into the Whiteout"	August 5, 2007
There are still thousands of loads to be delivered to the various mines, but the end of the season is in sight. Complicating matters is the fact that an Arctic storm is bearing down on northwestern Canada. Because of storm, special permission is granted allowing five trucks to head to the mines instead of the usual four. Drivers Alex, Jay, Rick, T.J., and newcomer Cody form up in this special convoy. At a rest stop, T.J. oversleeps and the convoy continues on without him. T.J. later leaves with another driver from the company he was driving for. The four remaining drivers head north to the mines, arriving just as the storm comes in, and are forced to stay at the mines because the ice roads have been closed down. During the storm, three drivers - including T.J. - go missing. It is later learned that T.J. had stopped at a portage and waited out the storm there. Meanwhile, Hugh brings his friend Danny to drive Drew's truck after Drew quit. Danny does not get very far before the truck has further problems, including very little turbo power and an overheating engine. Although Drew made the decision to leave, Hugh claims repeatedly that he was fired.
9	9	"The Big Melt"	August 12, 2007
In The Big Melt, the season is starting to wind down as spring inches nearer and the ice covering the lakes begins to melt. There is a push to get vital loads up to the mines before the ice roads melt. Alex takes a housing unit over an ice road to a closed mine in the process of being cleaned up. Jay participates in a special convoy, led by Mike Kimball, to the remote village of Deline with vital supplies - facing a number of challenges throughout the trip. After the first trailer he takes causes him to be overweight, he switches loads with another driver (Kimball) with a lighter truck. Then one of the trucks in the convoy has a fuel tank that comes loose, gets stuck underneath the truck, and is punctured when it hits the ground. This forces the convoy to stop to clean up the spill as best they can, and to remove the tank from underneath his truck. Rick confronts Hugh about the issues he is having with his rig - specifically the non-functional heaters, and decides that the time has come for him to leave the ice road as well. Rick hopes that he can continue being friends with Hugh, but states that he would never work for the man again. A new leader in the "dash for the cash" appears, Hugh has overtaken Alex in the money count.
10	10	"The Final Run"	August 19, 2007
The ice covering the lakes continues to melt as warmer weather finally arrives, and the ice road season winds down. Hugh is involved in an accident when he is sideswiped by another truck. Not only is his truck crippled by the accident, but one of the bags of ammonium nitrate he was carrying begins leaking onto the ice – which melts the ice at an even faster rate. Hugh and ice road maintenance crews work to contain the spill and clean the ammonium nitrate off the road. Another truck takes the load north while Hugh returns to Yellowknife (Hugh got credit for this load although he failed to take it all the way to its destination). Jay takes an underground rock truck north to the Fortune mine. Trying to climb a steep hill, he becomes stuck, due to the way the load sits on his truck, but fortunately there is a bulldozer on site to pull him the rest of the way. After reaching the mine and unloading the rock truck, Jay heads home for the season. Hugh manages to get one of his other trucks working, and takes a final load north. Alex convinces officials to allow him to take a light load north on his own; it turns out to be his final load of the season, as the road is closed soon afterwards. And a raven, sacred to the north, flies by T.J. for a second time as he takes his final load north, capping a remarkable rookie season. The season turns out to be one of the most successful seasons so far, with 10,922 loads totaling 331,000 tonnes (730 million pounds, or 365,000 U.S. tons) delivered. (Note: The total shown on screen is 662,000,000 pounds, corresponding to 331,000 US tons.) Total hauls for the season: Hugh - 37; Alex - 36; Jay - 35; T.J. - 23; Rick (Resigned) - 19; Drew (Resigned) - 13

=== Specials ===
Three additional one-hour specials ran in the weeks following "The Final Run". Then and Now premiered on August 26, 2007 and provided a look into the development and future of Canada's ice roads. Clips from season 1 were featured, as well as further commentary from Rowland, Debogorski, and road pioneer John Denison. Off the Ice premiered on September 2, 2007, bringing all six truckers together for a chance to express their thoughts about the job and each other. On the Edge premiered on September 9, 2007, continuing the discussion and exploring the truckers' lives during the off season.

A fourth special, The Road to Season 2, aired on June 1, 2008. This hour presented highlights from the first season and gave a preview of things to come in the second one.
