= Tibbitt to Contwoyto Winter Road =

Highway in the Northwest Territories

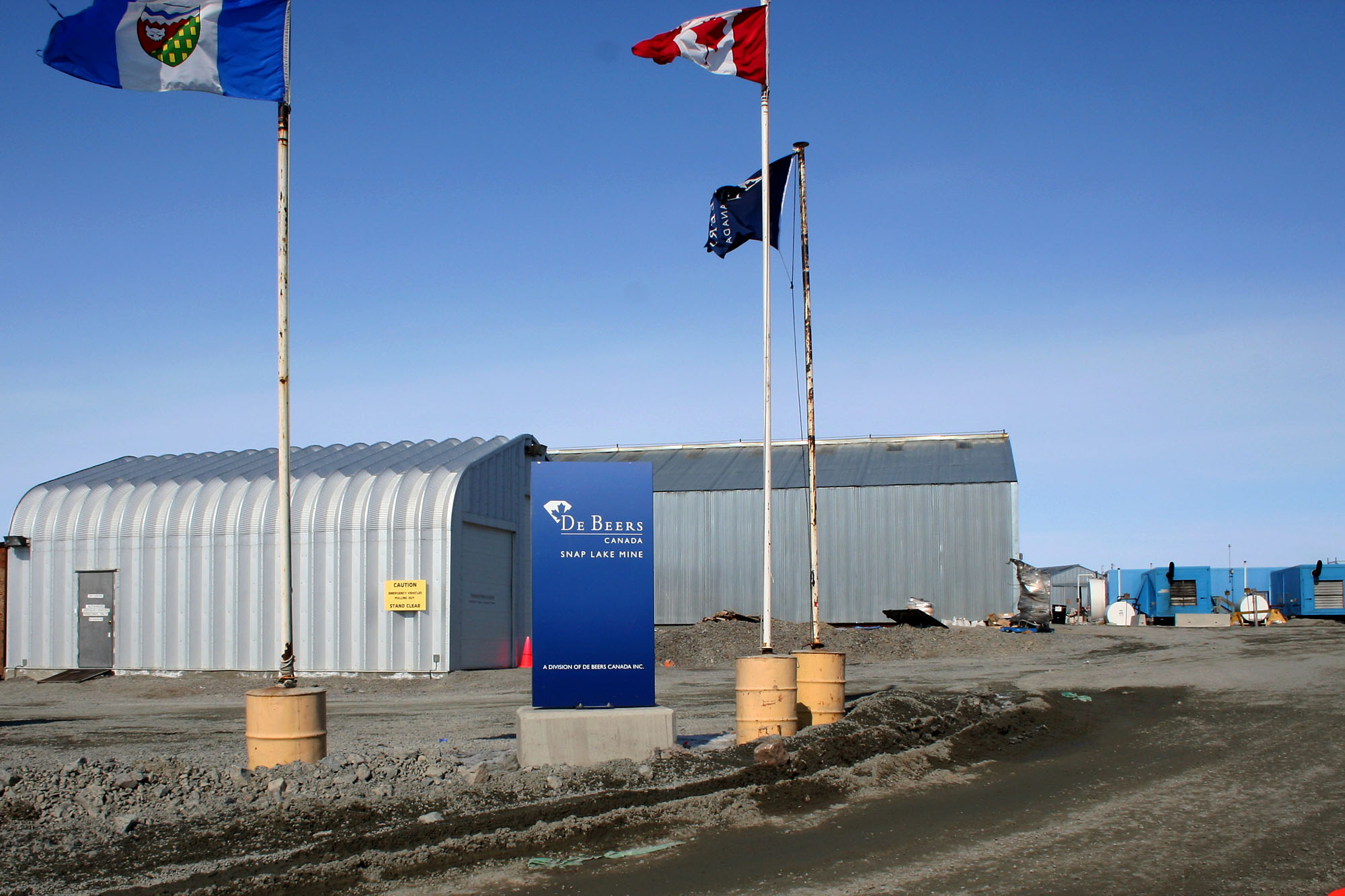
- The entrance of De Beers' Snap Lake Diamond Mine, NT

Route information
- Maintained by Nuna Logistics and RTL-Robinson
- Length: 600 km (370 mi) Can be as short as 400 km (250 mi)
- Existed: 1982–present

Major junctions
- West end: Ingraham Trail, Northwest Territories
- East end: Jericho Diamond Mine, Nunavut

Location
- Country: Canada

Highway system
- Northwest Territories highways
- Highways in Nunavut

Tibbitt to Contwoyto Winter Road is an annual ice road first built in 1982 to service mines and exploration activities in the Northwest Territories and Nunavut in Northern Canada. Between 400 and 600 km (250 and 370 mi) long, the road is said to be the world's longest heavy haul ice road and operates for eight to ten weeks starting in the last week of January. Most of the road (85%–87%) is built over frozen lakes, 495 km (308 mi), with the remaining 73 km (45 mi) built on over 64 land portages between lakes.

== Construction and operation ==
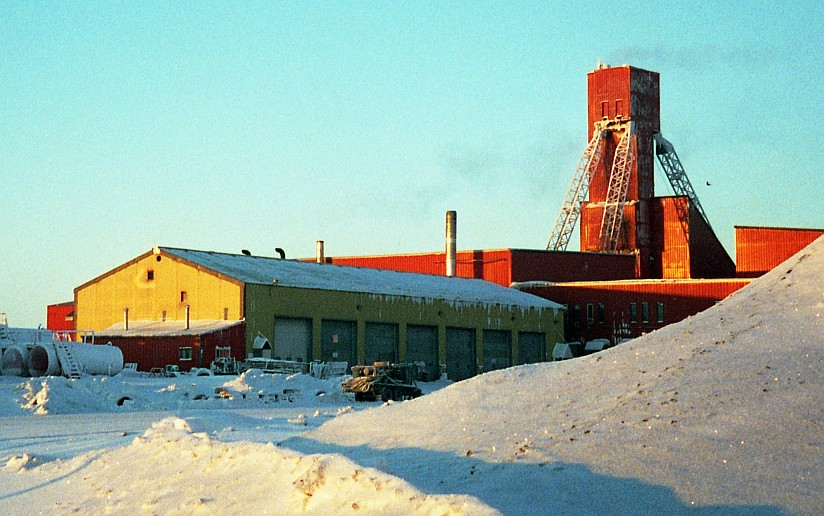
Lupin Mine Headframe in 1997 in the Northwest Territories (now Nunavut)

The winter road is constructed by Nuna Logistics and RTL-Robinson every January and takes about six weeks to complete. The first vehicle along each season is a Swedish-made Hägglund army-type reconnaissance vehicle designed to float if it falls through the ice; it tows a ground-penetrating radar to measure ice thickness. This is followed by road building equipment including "specialized low ground pressure equipment". The road, built extra wide to avoid blockages during blizzards and to allow opposing trucks to pass, is kept clear of snow, which acts as insulation, throughout the season as removal allows the ice to freeze faster and thicker. The road is 50 m (160 ft) wide on the ice, but narrower on land portages ranging between 12 and 15 m (39 and 49 ft) wide. Once initially built, the road is checked by drilling holes into the ice. If the ice needs to be thickened, water trucks are called in to add water to that specific area. The road is only operational during February and March, an average of 67 days per year. The ice has been proven by engineers to support light vehicle loads at 70 cm (28 in) and increasing to full highway truck loads as the ice thickens. A thickness of 107 cm (42 in) is required for a super B tanker carrying up to 50,000 L (11,000 imp gal; 13,000 US gal) and may weigh up to 42 t (41 long tons; 46 short tons).

On some lakes, traffic may be re-routed to new lanes to avoid damaged or rough sections of ice, and additional "express lanes" allow returning, empty trucks to travel at higher speeds.

The highest allowable speed for fully loaded trucks on the ice is 25 km/h (16 mph) with some areas reduced to only 10 km/h (6.2 mph). Empty trucks have a maximum speed limit of 60 km/h (37 mph) on the ice. Speed limits are strictly enforced by security personnel with radar used to clock speeds just as national and provincial police forces do.

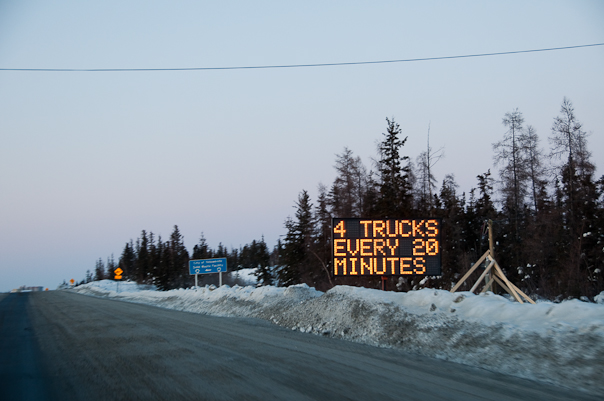
The dispatch point for the Tibbitt to Contwoyto Winter Road

There are three road camps servicing drivers hauling loads along the road, they are at: Dome Lake Maintenance Camp, Lockhart Lake and Lac de Gras. Dome Lake is for maintenance crew and emergency use for drivers, Lockhart Lake provides drivers with food, shower, and a place to do laundry. Lac de Gras is for road crews, emergency use and for driver facilities for drivers travelling north of Ekati.

Truck drivers are not allowed to travel the winter road alone, therefore, up to four trucks are dispatched from Yellowknife every 20 minutes. Heavy and wide loads are dispatched from Yellowknife between 12:00 am and 6:00 am to avoid daily commuter traffic.

The main product shipped is diesel fuel and other material includes "cement, tires, prill (ammonium nitrate) for explosives manufacture, and construction materials."

== History ==
The Tibbitt to Contwoyto Ice Road follows part of the original road that was cleared to the Tundra Mine in 1960–1961 by John Denison. This road began at Discovery Mine which was already connected to Yellowknife by ice road up the Yellowknife River and swung east to Gordon Lake, heading north up Drybones, Lockhart and Mackay Lakes where the Tundra Mine was located. This route was used until 1968 when the mine closed.

Statistics
| Year | Opened | Closed | Freight carried | | | Super B capacity | Number of |
| | | | Tonnes | Long tons | Short tons | reached | truck loads north |
|---|---|---|---|---|---|---|---|
| 2000 | January 29 | April 3 | 111,090 | 109,340 | 122,460 | n/a | 3,703 |
| 2001 | February 1 | April 13 | 245,586 | 241,707 | 270,712 | ~March 3 | 7,981 |
| 2002 | January 26 | April 16 | 256,915 | 252,857 | 283,200 | February 22 | 7,735 |
| 2003 | February 1 | April 2 | 198,818 | 195,678 | 219,159 | February 21 | 5,243 |
| 2004 | January 28 | March 31 | 179,144 | 176,315 | 197,472 | February 23 | 5,091 |
| 2005 | January 26 | April 5 | 252,533 | 248,545 | 278,370 | February 20 | 7,607 |
| 2006 | February 4 | March 26 | 177,674 | 174,868 | 195,852 | not reached | 6,841 |
| 2007 | January 27 | April 9 | 330,002 | 324,790 | 363,765 | February 26 | 10,922 |
| 2008 | January 29 | April 7 | 245,585 | 241,706 | 270,711 | February 15 | 7,484 |
| 2009 | February 1 | March 25 | 173,195 | 170,460 | 190,915 | February 15 | 5,377 |
| 2010 | February 4 | March 24 | 120,020 | 118,120 | 132,300 | TBA | 3,508 |
| 2011 | January 28 | March 31 | 239,000 | 235,000 | 263,000 | February 17 | 6,832 |
| 2012 | February 1 | March 28 | 210,188 | 206,868 | 231,693 | March 1 | 6,551 |
| 2013 | January 30 | March 31 | 223,206 | 219,681 | 246,042 | February 14 | 6,017 |
| 2014 | January 30 | April 1 | 243,928 | 240,076 | 268,885 | TBA | 7,069 |
| 2015 | January 30 | March 31 | 305,215 | 300,395 | 336,442 | TBA | 8,915 |
| 2016 | February 9 | Open 47 days | 262,261 | 258,119 | 289,093 | TBA | 8,766 |
| 2017 | February 1 | March 29 | 279,484 | 275,070 | 308,078 | TBA | 8,241 |
| 2018 | February 1 | Open 58 days | 303,725 | 298,928 | 334,800 | TBA | 8,209 |
| 2019 | February 1 | March 31 | 257,176 | 253,114 | 283,488 | TBA | 7,489 |
| 2020 | January 31 | April 8, open 60 days | 230,497 | 226,857 | 254,079 | TBA | 7,072 northbound 294 southbound |
| 2021 | February 8 | April 6, open 52 days | 210,126 | 206,807 | 231,624 | TBA | 6,102 northbound 225 southbound |
| 2022 | January 31 | March 31 (planned), open 65 days | 252,827 | 248,834 | 278,694 | TBA | 6,797 northbound 463 southbound |
| 2023 | February 6 | March 31 (planned), (actual after April 4, probably April 6), open 52 days | 213,509 | 210,137 | 235,353 | TBA | 6,014 northbound 534 southbound |
| 2024 | February 12 | On or before April 3 | TBA | | | March 2 | 6,400 |
| 2025 | February 4 | March 28 | TBA | | | February 20 | 5,800 northbound (98% by March 27) >600 southbound |
| 2026 | February 14 | April 10 | TBA | | | TBA | 3,200 northbound |
| 2027 | Construction for 2027 has been cancelled | | | | | | |

The road was reopened in 1979 as part of an equipment haul to the new Lupin Mine at Contwoyto Lake, now Nunavut but then the NWT, pioneered by Robinson's Trucking and Hugh Arden. It followed the old Discovery Mine to Gordon Lake route. An experimental operation, Lupin decided not to continue using the road at this time and relied instead on Hercules C-130 aircraft to haul in machinery during construction of the mine.

In 1983, the ice road to Lupin Mine reopened as an economic alternative to yearly freight haul using aircraft. The section between Tibbitt Lake (at the end of the Ingraham Trail) and Gordon Lake was built at this time. Another gold mine, the Salmita Mine (operated between 1983 and 1987) also benefited from this ice road.

Until 1998, the road was licensed and operated by Echo Bay Mines, owners of the Lupin Mine, after which it became a joint venture between Echo Bay Mines, BHP Billiton, and Diavik Diamond Mines.

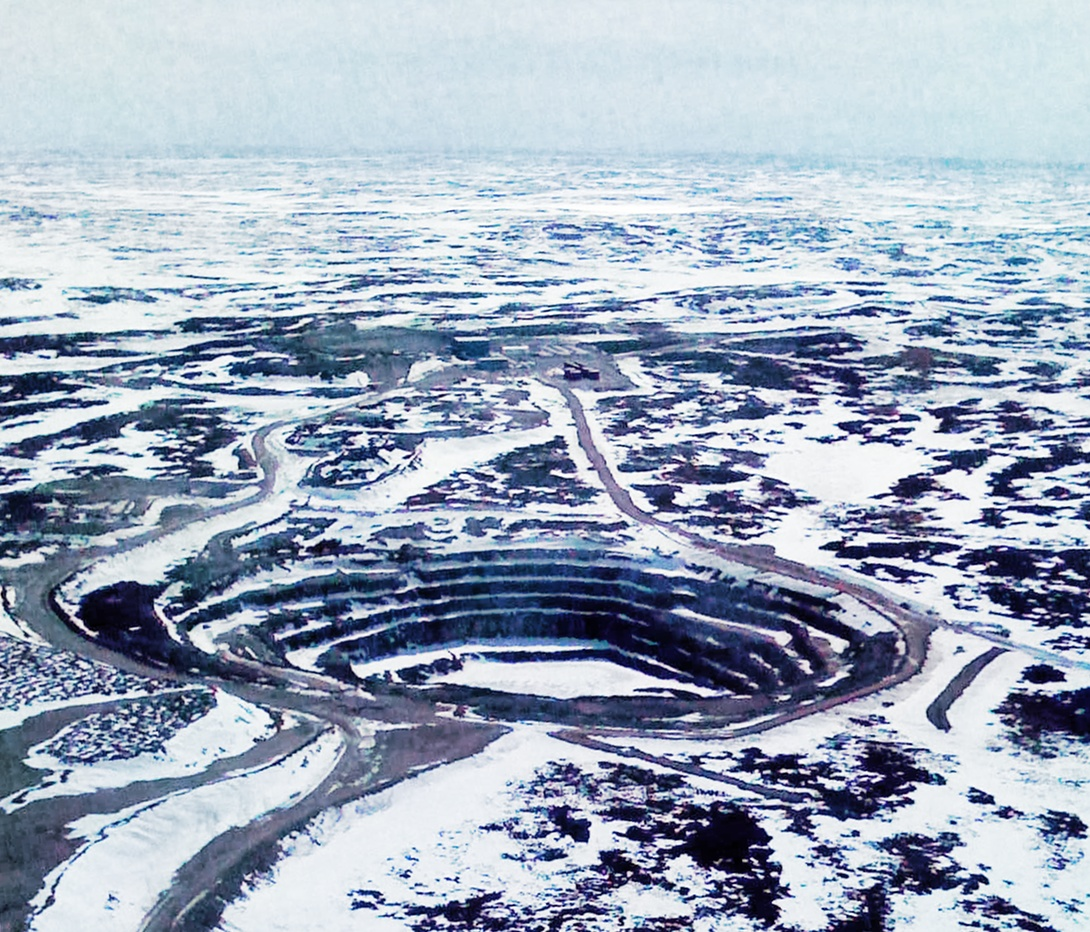
The defunct Jericho Diamond Mine, Nunavut, Canada. The mine site (buildings and fuel tank farm) is visible in the background behind the open pit.

Since 1999, the road has been licensed and operated by the Tibbitt to Contwoyto Winter Road Joint Venture, today a partnership between BHP Billiton, Diavik Diamond Mines (Rio Tinto) and De Beers Canada. The road is engineered by Nor-Ex Ice Engineering, and, since 1998, Nuna Logistics, a 51% Inuit owned joint venture between the Nunasi Corporation, Kitikmeot Corporation and Nuna Management Group, has been responsible for the annual construction, maintenance, dispatching, and camp catering for the primary road, with RTL Enterprises taking care of the secondary road. Security on the road, provided by SecureCheck until 2009, is now provided by Det’on Cho Scarlet Security. Det’on Cho is a Yellowknives Dene company with headquarters in N'Dilo and Scarlet Security, based in Yellowknife, is an Alarand affiliate.

The year 2007 saw record usage of the ice road with 10,922 loads north, totalling 330,002 t (324,790 long tons; 363,765 short tons). That record number doesn't include the 818 back hauls south, totalling 15,000 t (15,000 long tons; 17,000 short tons). The road was open for 73 days from January 27 to April 9, only closed for a total of 91.5 hours (70 hours due to storms and 21.5 hours due to minor incidents). There were over 700 drivers registered during 2007 with nine accidents and one minor injury (a bruised shoulder). During the record 2007 season, there were 99 verbal, 5 written warnings and 5 speeding violations. Nine five-day suspensions and seven season suspensions were issued.

In 2007 the road was featured on The History Channel series called Ice Road Truckers. The mining company that owned the road where the first season was filmed felt that the show portrayed the road in a negative fashion, and decided not to participate in future seasons of the show. A new rule for the Tibbitt to Contwoyto Winter Roads was enacted for the 2008 season prohibiting commercial, media, video or rolling film cameras either inside or attached to the outside of vehicle. The show's producers said that they had located an alternate ice road and that there would be a second season of the show; the road featured in season 2 was the Tuktoyaktuk Winter Road.

On 26 March 2026 Rio Tinto announced that the Diavik diamond mine had ceased production after 23 years of operations and more than 150 million carats of rough diamonds. Closure activities will extend to 2029.

== Routes ==
=== Primary route ===
The ice road begins about 65 km (40 mi) east of Yellowknife at the end of Highway 4, more commonly known as the Ingraham Trail.

From there, it winds its way north the following destinations:

Tibbitt to Contwoyto Winter Road (main route)
| Distance | | Location | Territory | Notes |
| km | mi | | | |
|---|---|---|---|---|
| 0 | 0 | Tibbitt Lake | NT | Start of road^{map 1} |
| 7 | 4.3 | Meadows Station | NT | Security checkpoint |
| 35 | 22 | Dome Lake | NT | Maintenance camp^{map 2} |
| 170 | 110 | Lockhart Lake | NT | Rest stop^{map 3} |
| 264 | 164 | Snap Lake Diamond Mine | NT | Owned by De Beers Canada and located southeast of the road^{map 4} |
| | | Gahcho Kue Diamond Mine | NT | Owned by a joint-venture between Mountain Province Diamonds and De Beers Canada, located southeast of the road^{map 5} |
| 350 | 220 | Lac de Gras | NT | Rest stop (for Lupin/Jericho traffic only)^{map 6} |
| 373 | 232 | Diavik Diamond Mine | NT | Owned by a joint venture between the Dominion Diamond Mines and Diavik Diamond Mines, a subsidiary of Rio Tinto Group^{map 7} |
| 378 | 235 | Misery | NT | Satellite mining camp of the Ekati Diamond Mine^{map 8} |
| 405 | 252 | Ekati Diamond Mine | NT | Owned by Dominion Diamond Mines, northwest of the road^{map 9} |
| | | Pellatt Lake | NT/NU | Crossing the NT/NU border^{map 10} |
| 568 | 353 | Lupin Gold Mine | NU | Closed 2006, owned by Echo Bay Mines Limited^{map 11} |
| 600 | 370 | Jericho Diamond Mine | NU | Closed 2008, owned by Tahera Diamond Corporation^{map 12} |

The road ends in Jericho Diamond Mine, at the north end of Contwoyto Lake, Nunavut. With the closing of the Lupin and Jericho mines, the road is no longer built to Contwoyto Lake. According to the 2020 JVTC Map book the road is shorted to 367km at the Ekati Mine on Lac De Gras.

=== Secondary route ===
The secondary route begins about 20 km (12 mi) east of Yellowknife at Prosperous Lake.^{map 13} The road heads north across the lake just to the west of Cassidy Point^{map 14} and through Quyta Lake where some of the earliest gold samples were found in 1933.^{map 15} From there the road continues north to Johnston Lake^{map 16} and then northeast to Giauque Lake,^{map 17} with a road heading west to the old Discovery Mine, now the Yellowknife Gold Project^{map 18} operated by Tyhee Development. From Giauque the road travels east across Thistlethwaite Lake^{map 19} and northeast through Smokey Lake^{map 20} before joining the main route just north of Gordon Lake.^{map 19}

== Maps ==
- ^map 1Tibbitt Lake - 62°33′14″N 113°21′00″W
- ^map 2Dome Lake - 62°45′44″N 113°15′01″W
- ^map 3Lockhart Lake - 63°39′32″N 112°03′41″W
- ^map 4Snap Lake Diamond Mine - 63°36′20″N 112°52′00″W
- ^map 5Gahcho Kue Diamond Mine Project - 63°26′05″N 109°12′02″W
- ^map 6Lac de Gras - 64°28′25″N 110°13′41″W
- ^map 7Diavik Diamond Mine - 64°29′46″N 110°16′24″W
- ^map 8Misery - 64°34′03″N 110°10′47″W
- ^map 9Ekati Diamond Mine - 64°42′49″N 110°37′10″W
- ^map 10Pellatt Lake - 65°00′20″N 109°45′22″W
- ^map 11Lupin Mine - 65°44′59″N 111°14′58″W
- ^map 12Jericho Diamond Mine - 66°01′00″N 111°28′26″W
- ^map 13Prosperous Lake - 62°32′34″N 114°08′56″W
- ^map 14Cassidy Point - 62°32′58″N 114°10′56″W
- ^map 15Quyta Lake - 62°43′45″N 114°18′02″W
- ^map 16Johnston Lake - 62°59′42″N 114°12′06″W
- ^map 17Giauque Lake - 63°10′40″N 113°49′38″W
- ^map 18Yellowknife Gold Project - 63°11′14″N 113°53′48″W
- ^map 19Thistlethwaite Lake - 63°09′24″N 113°35′51″W
- ^map 20Smokey Lake - 63°13′41″N 113°18′21″W
- ^map 21Gordon Lake - 63°04′48″N 113°12′50″W

== Media ==
The ice road was the location of the first season of Ice Road Truckers.

This road inspired the Netflix movie The Ice Road.

== See also ==
- Highways in Nunavut
- Wetum Road
