= List of airports in Nunavut =

Nunavut

This is a list of airports in Nunavut. It includes all Nav Canada certified and registered water and land airports, aerodromes and heliports in the Canadian territory of Nunavut. Airport names in italics are part of the National Airports System. With the exception of Iqaluit and Sanikiluaq airports, all other airports in Nunavut are within the Northern Domestic Airspace.

== List of airports and heliports ==
The list is sorted by the name of the community served; click the sort buttons in the table header to switch listing order.

Community	Airport name	PU PR MI	AOE (Note: An airport of entry has four different categories. An AOE which can accept "all classes of scheduled and non-scheduled aircraft (passenger and cargo)." An AOE/# which can handle aircraft in the previous category but up to maximum number. This number can be exceeded if done in stages as shown in parentheses. An AOE/15 that can accept general aviation aircraft with a maximum of 15 passengers. An AOE/CAN which can handle aircraft subject to the CANPASS regulations.)	Operator	Elevation	ICAO	TC LID	IATA	Image	Coordinates
Alert	Alert Airport	MI		DND / 1CdnAirDiv Alert AMO Ottawa	100 ft (30 m)	CYLT		YLT		82°31′02″N 62°17′04″W
Arctic Bay	Arctic Bay Airport	PU		Government of Nunavut	72 ft (22 m)	CYAB		YAB		73°00′19″N 85°01′59″W
Arviat	Arviat Airport	PU		Government of Nunavut	34 ft (10 m)	CYEK		YEK		61°05′39″N 94°04′15″W
Arviat	Arviat Water Aerodrome	PR		Joe Savikataaq	20 ft (6.1 m)		CRV8			61°08′50″N 94°06′57″W
Baker Lake	Baker Lake Airport	PU		Government of Nunavut	61 ft (19 m)	CYBK		YBK		64°17′56″N 96°04′40″W
Baker Lake	Baker Lake Water Aerodrome	PU		Avn Fuel Enterprises	8 ft (2.4 m)		CJK6			64°19′00″N 96°01′00″W
Cambridge Bay	Cambridge Bay Airport	PU		Government of Nunavut	102 ft (31 m)	CYCB		YCB		69°06′29″N 105°08′18″W
Cambridge Bay	Cambridge Bay Water Aerodrome	PU		Adlair Aviation	0 ft (0 m)		CJD7			69°07′20″N 105°01′15″W
Chesterfield Inlet	Chesterfield Inlet Airport	PU		Government of Nunavut	32 ft (9.8 m)	CYCS		YCS		63°20′50″N 90°43′52″W
Clyde River	Clyde River Airport	PU		Government of Nunavut	87 ft (27 m)	CYCY		YCY		70°29′10″N 68°31′00″W
Coral Harbour	Coral Harbour Airport	PU		Government of Nunavut	204 ft (62 m)	CYZS		YZS		64°11′36″N 83°21′34″W
Eureka	Eureka Aerodrome	PR		Environment Canada	272 ft (83 m)	CYEU		YEU		79°59′40″N 85°48′43″W
George Lake	George Lake Aerodrome	PR		Sabina Gold and Silver Corp.	1,150 ft (350 m)		CGR3			65°55′43″N 107°27′45″W
Gjoa Haven	Gjoa Haven Airport	PU		Government of Nunavut	154 ft (47 m)	CYHK		YHK		68°38′08″N 95°51′01″W
Goose Lake	Goose Lake Aerodrome	PR		B2Gold Corp	973 ft (297 m)		CGS2			65°33′03″N 106°26′17″W
Grise Fiord	Grise Fiord Airport	PU		Government of Nunavut	135 ft (41 m)	CYGZ		YGZ		76°25′33″N 82°54′29″W
Hope Bay	Hope Bay Aerodrome	PR		Agnico Eagle Mines Limited	155 ft (47 m)		CHB3	UZM		68°09′40″N 106°36′56″W
Igloolik	Igloolik Airport	PU		Government of Nunavut	173 ft (53 m)	CYGT		YGT		69°21′53″N 81°48′58″W
Iqaluit	Iqaluit Airport	PU	15	Government of Nunavut	110 ft (34 m)	CYFB		YFB		63°45′23″N 68°33′21″W
Kimmirut	Kimmirut Airport	PU		Government of Nunavut	169 ft (52 m)	CYLC		YLC		62°51′00″N 69°53′00″W
Kinngait	Kinngait Airport	PU		Government of Nunavut	158 ft (48 m)	CYTE		YTE		64°13′49″N 76°31′29″W
Kugaaruk	Kugaaruk Airport	PU		Government of Nunavut	51 ft (16 m)	CYBB		YBB		68°32′04″N 89°48′29″W
Kugluktuk	Kugluktuk Airport	PU		Government of Nunavut	74 ft (23 m)	CYCO		YCO		67°49′00″N 115°08′38″W
Mary River	Mary River Aerodrome	PR		Baffinland Iron Ore Mines	589 ft (180 m)		CMR2	YMV		71°19′25″N 79°21′14″W
Meadowbank Gold Mine	Meadowbank Aerodrome	PR		Agnico-Eagle (Division Meadowbank)	475 ft (145 m)		CMB2			65°01′30″N 96°04′15″W
Naujaat	Naujaat Airport	PU		Government of Nunavut	75 ft (23 m)	CYUT		YUT		66°31′17″N 86°13′29″W
Pangnirtung	Pangnirtung Airport	PU		Government of Nunavut	79 ft (24 m)	CYXP		YXP		66°08′42″N 65°42′49″W
Pond Inlet	Pond Inlet Airport	PU		Government of Nunavut	202 ft (62 m)	CYIO		YIO		72°41′22″N 77°58′08″W
Qikiqtarjuaq	Qikiqtarjuaq Airport	PU		Government of Nunavut	18 ft (5.5 m)	CYVM		YVM		67°32′45″N 64°01′53″W
Rankin Inlet	Rankin Inlet Airport	PU		Government of Nunavut	106 ft (32 m)	CYRT		YRT		62°48′41″N 92°06′57″W
Resolute	Resolute Bay Airport	PU		Government of Nunavut	222 ft (68 m)	CYRB		YRB		74°43′01″N 94°58′10″W
Sandspit Lake	Hayes Camp Aerodrome	PR		North Country Gold	780 ft (240 m)		CHC5			68°39′20″N 91°32′42″W
Sanikiluaq	Sanikiluaq Airport	PU		Government of Nunavut	110 ft (34 m)	CYSK		YSK		56°32′13″N 79°15′00″W
Sanirajak	Sanirajak Airport	PU		Government of Nunavut	30 ft (9.1 m)	CYUX		YUX		68°46′32″N 81°14′40″W
Somerset Island	Arctic Watch Lodge Aerodrome	PR		Canadian Arctic Holdings	21 ft (6.4 m)		CRW4			74°03′05″N 93°47′06″W
Taloyoak	Taloyoak Airport	PU		Government of Nunavut	90 ft (27 m)	CYYH		YYH		69°32′48″N 93°34′37″W
Tanquary Fiord	Tanquary Fiord Airport	PR		Parks Canada	50 ft (15 m)		CJQ6			81°24′34″N 76°52′54″W
Whale Cove	Whale Cove Airport	PU		Government of Nunavut	40 ft (12 m)	CYXN		YXN		62°14′24″N 92°35′53″W

== Defunct airports ==
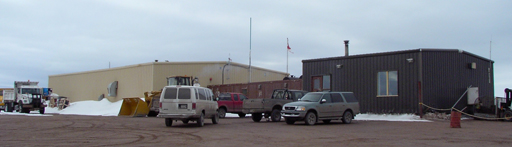
Nanisivik Airport terminal

Community	Airport name	ICAO	TC LID	IATA	Coordinates
Doris Lake	Doris Lake Aerodrome		CDL7	JOJ	68°07′31″N 106°35′07″W
Iqaluit	Frobisher Bay Air Base				63°45′21″N 068°32′23″W
Lupin Mine	Lupin Airport	CYWO		YWO	65°45′33″N 111°15′00″W
Nanisivik	Nanisivik Airport	CYSR		YSR	72°58′56″N 084°36′49″W
