= Henry Busse (photographer) =

Photographer

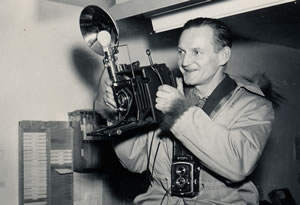
- Henry Busse in 1947
- Born: 1896; Waldshaart, Germany
- Died: 1962 (aged 65–66); Nahanni valley
- Other name: Hans Heinrich Maximilian Busse
- Occupation: Photographer
- Known for: His photos from Port Radium are part of the history of the development of the Atomic Bomb

Henry Busse was an amateur photographer, who, while working at the Eldorado Mine, in remote Port Radium, took photos of high enough quality he was encouraged to become a professional photographer. He was the first professional photographer in the Northwest Territories. In 1961 the Northern News Service reported he had been named as one of Canada's 50 most important photographers.

== Life in Germany ==
Busse's father was a judge. He enlisted in the German artillery, during World War One, and studied Agriculture at the University of Bonn. He married, and fathered a daughter, in Germany, but separated prior to his immigration to Canada, in 1927.

== Life in Canada ==
Port Radium was the source of the Uranium used by the Manhattan Project in building the first atomic bombs, and his photographs help document that part of the history of the development of atomic energy.

Busse died in a bush plane accident, in 1962. The Northwest Territories Archives' collection holds between 30,000 and 50,000 photographs taken by Busse.
