= JD-03 pipe =

Coordinates: 66.0077°N 111.4900°W

The JD-03 pipe is a kimberlite diatreme in Nunavut, Canada, located 7 km (4 mi) from the Jericho Diamond Mine, where diamonds were mined from the late 1990s. It was discovered in 1996 and is interpreted to be pyroclastic with intense serpentinization.

The JD-03 pipe formed by an explosive eruption when this part of Nunavut was volcanically active. In addition, it contains several crustal xenoliths including limestone and granite.

== See also ==
- Volcanism in Canada
- List of volcanoes in Canada
