= Lupin Airport =

Former airfield in Lupin Mine

Lupin Mine Airport
- IATA: ~~YWO~~; ICAO: ~~CYWO~~; WMO: 71470

Summary
- Airport type: ~~Private~~
- Operator: ~~Echo Bay Mines Limited~~
- Location: Lupin Mine
- Time zone: MST (UTC−07:00)
  - Summer (DST): MDT (UTC−06:00)
- Elevation AMSL: 1,608 ft (490 m)
- Coordinates: 65°45′33″N 111°15′00″W

Map
- Location in Nunavut

Runways
Direction	Length		Surface
Direction	ft	m	Surface
~~01T/19T~~	~~6,400~~	~~1,950~~	~~Gravel~~
- Sources: Canada Flight Supplement; Environment Canada

Lupin Airport ~~(IATA: YWO, ICAO: CYWO)~~ was an airport located at Lupin Mine, Nunavut, Canada, that was operated by Echo Bay Mines Limited. The airport closed sometime after the mine closed in 2005, but the runway is still present on the property.

== History ==
In the 1950s and 60s this area was known as Contwoyto Lake. Nearby (at location 65 degrees 29' 12.61"N, 110 degrees 21'1.33"W) is an island where there was a small (four person) camp operated by Pacific Western Airlines of Vancouver, British Columbia, Canada (since merged with Canadian Pacific Airlines, subsequently bought by Air Canada). Operating expenses for the facility were paid for by the Canadian Federal Government. The island was unofficially known as Alcatraz Island and the smaller one West of it was called Wolf Island.

During the 60s there was a Quonset hut for living quarters and a small shed which housed a diesel generator, a backup generator, fuel, and a small tractor. There was no official landing strip, just a dirt strip for emergencies. Planes landed on the lake using floats in the summer and skis in winter. There was a very short emergency strip on land, but it was really too short for safety. The main function of the station was to operate a radio beacon (sending WO in Morse Code for radio-location purposes) and a secondary but very important function was to radio weather observations hourly to Yellowknife, Northwest Territories.

During the 1980s, the Lupin Mine was an operating gold producer under its owner, Echo Bay Mines.

The mine itself was entirely constructed out of materials flown into the airport, primarily on a cold-war era Hercules C130 that the mining company had obtained for that specific purpose. Once the mine was up and running, the company replaced the Hercules with a converted Boeing 727 commercial jetliner. The Boeing had been converted to operate as a combination cargo and passenger craft. The typical flight carried the aircrew, miners and contractors. The cargo was usually a very large load of diesel along with the parts, equipment and other supplies needed to operate the mine.

Edmonton and Yellowknife were the primary logistical support centers for the mine. Supply and personnel flights into the Lupin Airport twice a week usually originated in Edmonton. A stopover for refueling normally occurred at Yellowknife and it could happen on the way to or from the mine. By this time the landing strip had been upgraded and lengthened to support the landing and takeoff requirements of a 727. The Hercules used to build the mine apparently worked fine on the original dirt strip, and it did so until the runway was upgraded. Additional charter flights were flown to Cambridge Bay and Kugluktuk to serve miners from these nearby communities.

The upgraded runway had a gravel base and it was maintained with graders and snow removal equipment for year-round operation. It also had modern (for the time) navigation equipment and it operated as a fully operational airport complete with metal detectors and baggage handling facilities. Besides supporting the mine, during this period the airport was also an emergency landing strip for other aircraft operating in Canada's far north. To support emergency operations, the commercial jet operated by the mining company was also used to bring parts and other supplies for stranded or damaged aircraft.

As a precaution against an emergency landing, or worse, a crash in sub-zero arctic weather, passengers going to the airport were also required to bring extreme weather clothing on board. This clothing was treated as personal luggage and was stored during flight in the overhead compartments where it was available for immediate retrieval in the event of an emergency. The requirements included a proper arctic parka with a hood, full size winter boots and mittens. Gloves were of course allowed, but mittens were required. The aircraft also carried significant emergency supplies to support crash survivors if need be. Fortunately, and mostly due to the experienced professionals who made up the Echo Bay air service, these measures were never needed. Considering the amount of diesel fuel that was typically on board, this was especially fortunate. But the extreme clothing requirements were quite a surprise to first time visitors who were accustomed to air travel elsewhere.
