= YMV =

YMV may refer to:

- Mary River Aerodrome, Nunavut, Canada
- Yam mosaic virus, cause of a plant disease in yams
