= Eldorado Radium Silver Express =

Canadian air service

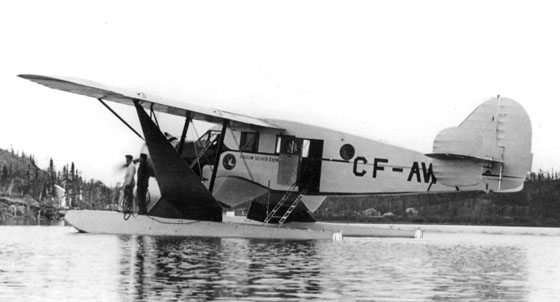
Eldorado Radium Silver Express.

The Eldorado Radium Silver Express (alternately Radium Express) was the name of Bellanca Aircruiser CF-AWR that provided a semi-regular air service between Edmonton, Alberta and Port Radium, Northwest Territories from 1935 to 1947.

== History ==
During the late 1930s Port Radium was one of the few sources of radium.

During World War II, the Eldorado Mine was the second source of uranium used by the atomic bomb program (the primary source was ore from the Belgian Congo). Other than the air charter, goods and personnel could only be conveyed to and from the northernmost terminus of the North American railway grid, at Waterways, Alberta, was by water, a 1,450 miles (2,330 km) trip that took weeks.

The rivers are frozen almost eight months of the year, closing down the initial leg of the trip. During that time, the mine required an airplane. The plane crashed in northern Ontario in 1947. The Royal Aviation Museum of Western Canada in Winnipeg has restored the aircraft for static display.

Eldorado Aviation continued to operate for several more years and was still listed in the federal Financial Administration Act as a Crown corporation in the 1970s.

== See also ==
- List of defunct airlines of Canada
