= Elizabeth Tunnuq =

Canadian Inuk artist (1928–2008)

Elizabeth Tunnuq (1928 – 16 February 2008) (Inuktitut: ᐃᓕᓴᐱ ᑐᓐᓄᖅ) was a Canadian Inuk artist. Tunnuq died on 16 February 2008.

Her work is included in the collections of the Art Gallery of Guelph and the government of Nunavut fine art collection.
