= Josie Pisuktie =

Inuk artist

Josie Pisuktie (1901, date of death unknown) was an Inuk artist.

Her work is included in the collections of the National Gallery of Canada, the Scott Polar Research Institute and the Government of Nunavut fine art collection.
