= Camille Iquliq =

Inuk artist

- Born: 1963
- Died: 2005 (aged 41–42)

Camille Iquliq (1963–2005) was an Inuk artist who lived in Baker Lake, Nunavut, and began carving in 1984. Her father Tuna and brothers Louie and Johnny were carvers as well as her mother, Sarah Anautaq Iquliq, who also drew and made prints.

Iquliq often worked with soapstone, most frequently depicting rounded human figures with a focus on families. She also carved animal figures as well as working in wool felt. Some of this work is in the Government of Nunavut Fine Art Collection and the Musee national des beaux-arts du Quebec.

Iquliq died in 2005 as a result of cancer.
