= Jericho pipe =

Coordinates: 65°59′50″N 111°28′30″W

The Jericho pipe is a diamondiferous diatreme in the Slave craton of Nunavut, Canada, located 400 km (249 mi) northeast of Yellowknife near the northern end of Contwoyto Lake. It is home to the now closed Jericho Diamond Mine.

== See also ==
- List of volcanoes in Canada
- Volcanology of Canada
- Volcanology of Northern Canada
