= Tahera (mining company) =

Tahera Diamond Corporation
- Type: Public
- Traded as: TSX: TAH
- Industry: Non-metal mines
- Headquarters: Toronto, Ontario, Canada
- Key people: R. Peter Gillin
- Number of employees: 15 (2008)
- Website: www.tahera.com

Tahera Diamond Corporation was a Canadian diamond mining company headquartered in Toronto, Ontario. Tahera's Jericho Diamond Mine was Canada's third, and Nunavut's first, diamond mine.

Tahera opened the Jericho mine in 2006. During production Tahera had a diamond marketing alliance with Tiffany & Co. In 2007 the company reported financial losses due to operational difficulties, the high value of the Canadian dollar, high oil prices, and the short operating season of the Tibbitt-Contwoyto winter road in 2006.

In mid-January 2008, Tahera filed an application for protection from creditors, and in February it suspended its mining operations. Ore processing and diamond recovery continued until ore stockpiles were exhausted. In September 2008, a private Vancouver-based company announced a Plan Sponsorship Agreement with Tahera; however, in November Tahera announced that the Plan Sponsor's conditions were not met and the agreement fell through.

As of March 30, 2010 the company was in a stay period under the Companies' Creditors Arrangement Act (CCAA). The company obtained court approval for the process of selling the Jericho Diamond Mine and other assets on 15 January 2010, and consequently opened a sales website.

On July 19, 2010 Shear Diamonds (TSX-V: SRM) announced that it had signed an agreement with Tahera Diamond Corp. and Benachee Resources Inc. to acquire the Jericho Diamond Mine. . The successful closing of the acquisition agreement was announced on August 27, 2010.

== See also ==
- Diamonds as an investment
