= Ingraham Trail =

Highway in the Northwest Territories

Ingraham Trail
- Northwest Territories Highway 4
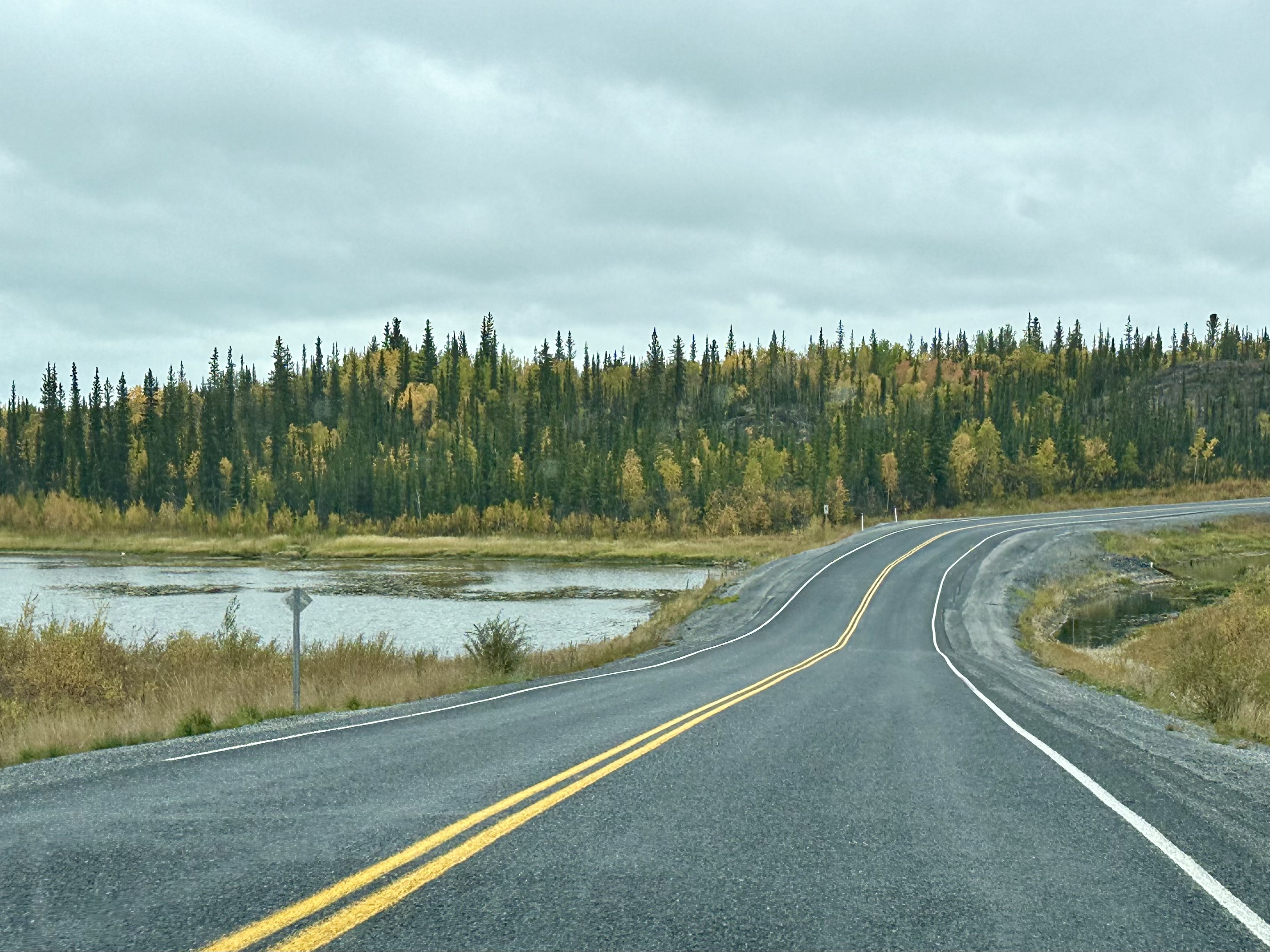

Route information
- Maintained by Department of Transportation
- Length: 69.2 km (43.0 mi)

Major junctions
- West end: Highway 3 (Yellowknife Highway) in Yellowknife
- East end: Tibbitt Lake

Location
- Country: Canada
- Territory: Northwest Territories

Highway system
- Northwest Territories highways
← Highway 3	→ Highway 5

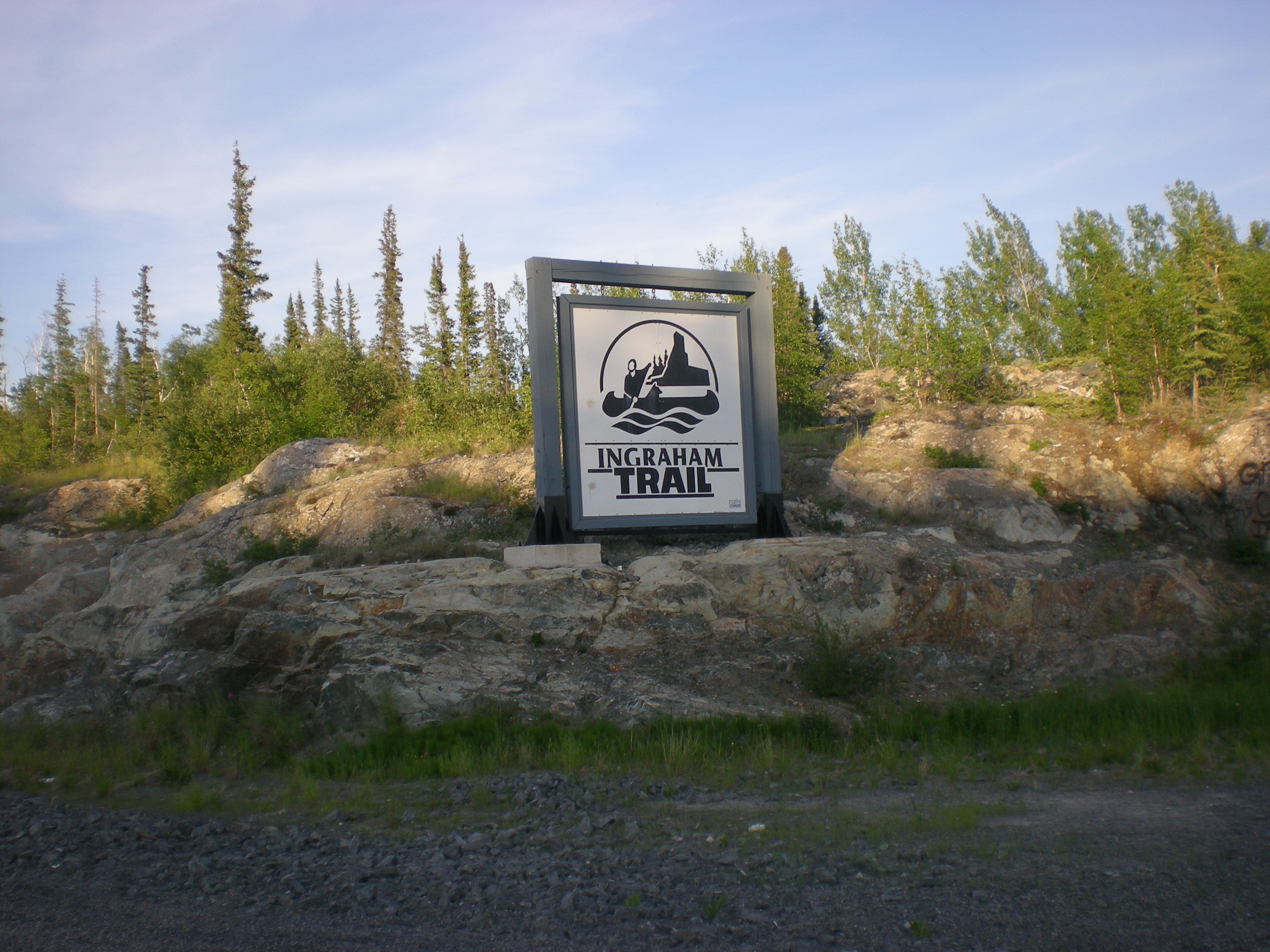
Sign on the trail

The Ingraham Trail, officially Northwest Territories Highway 4, extends from Yellowknife, Northwest Territories to Tibbitt Lake, approximately 70 km (43 mi) east of Yellowknife. It was built in the mid-1960s as the first leg of a 'road to resources' with the original intention of encircling Great Slave Lake.

The highway is designated as a northern/remote route of Canada's National Highway System.

The Ingraham Trail serves as both an industrial and recreational highway. In February and March each year, the trail is the initial section of the Tibbitt to Contwoyto Winter Road to three diamond mines located 300 km (190 mi) northeast of Yellowknife. The trail is also known as Yellowknife's cottage country, with the bulk of seasonal and year-round cabins located between Cassidy Point and Prelude Lake Territorial Park. During the winter road program, B-train tractor trailers travel the road, four loads every 20 minutes, 24 hours a day.

Although it serves primarily recreational activities and area residences in this lake-dotted country, after the ice break-up on Great Slave Lake, the highway is the only access to Dettah from Yellowknife. The small Dene community is about 6.5 km (4.0 mi) from Yellowknife by ice road in winter or 27 km (17 mi) using the Ingraham Trail.

For about a month in late winter, a winter road to Lac de Gras is opened to trucking of mining supplies, the junction being along the Ingraham Trail. The road condition has suffered due to its frequent use by heavy trucks. This is shown on the first season of the American reality television series, Ice Road Truckers, which aired on History. The Tibbitt to Contwoyto Winter Road also extends from the end of the Ingraham Trail to Contwoyto Lake in Nunavut, forming Nunavut's only connection to the road network in the rest of Canada.

The Ingraham Trail is named after Vic Ingraham, a pioneer Yellowknife businessman of the 1930s–40s.

Yellowknife has experienced an aurora borealis tourism boom the last few years and the Ingraham Trail is the prime viewing location. It is common to come across aurora rush after midnight during the peak aurora season, November to March.

== Details ==
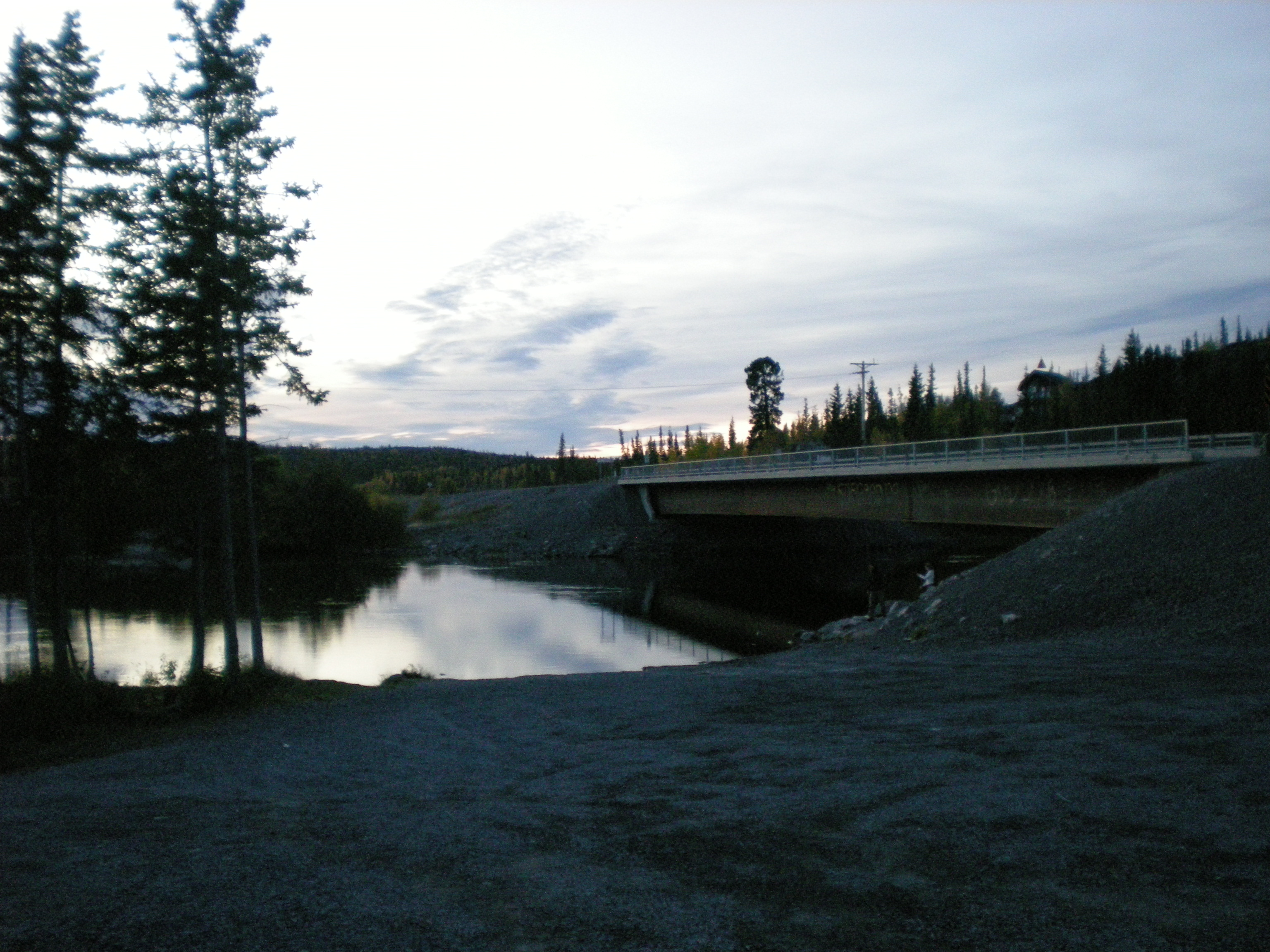
Ingraham Trail crossing the Yellowknife River

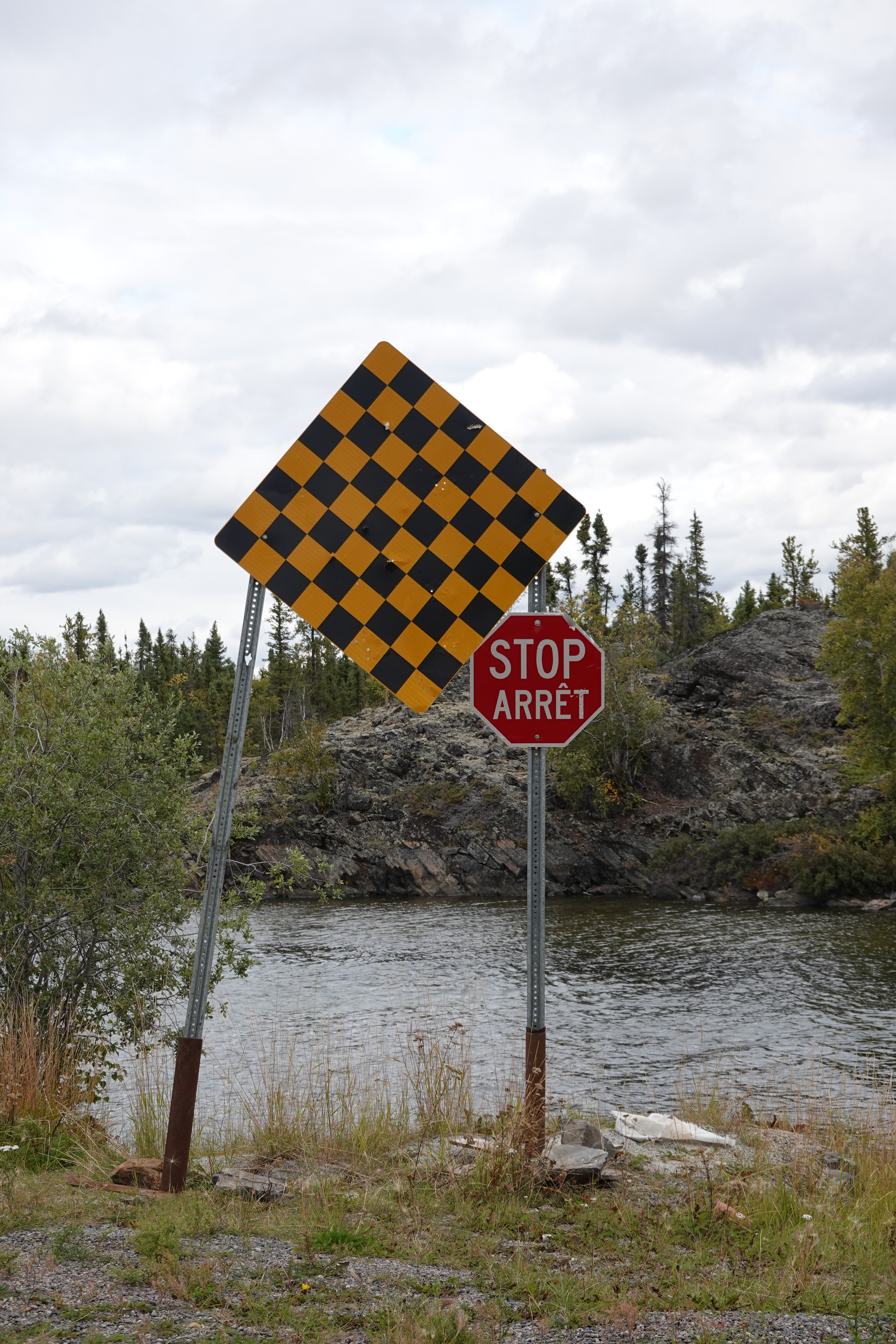
End of the Ingraham Trail at Tibbitt Lake

Since January 2014, the road bypasses Giant Mine through a realignment that originates off Highway 3, approximately 2 km (1.2 mi) from the Old Airport Road turnoff. At 7.6 km (4.7 mi) the road crosses the Yellowknife River followed by the Dettah turnoff at 9.8 km (6.1 mi). After this the road passes several territorial parks:

- Yellowknife River Territorial Park (7.7 km (4.8 mi))
- Dettah turnoff (9.8 km (6.1 mi))
- Prosperous Lake Territorial Park (19.7 km (12.2 mi))
- Madeline Lake Territorial Park (24 km (15 mi))
- Pontoon Lake Territorial Park (26.4 km (16.4 mi))
- Prelude Lake Territorial Park (28 km (17 mi)
- Hidden Lake Territorial Park (44 km (27 mi))
- Powder Point Day Use Area 44 km (27 mi))
- Cameron River Falls Day Use Area/Hiking Trail Access (45.8 km (28.5 mi))
- Cameron River Crossing (54.5 km (33.9 mi))
- Reid Lake Territorial Park (59 km (37 mi))

before reaching Tibbitt Lake (69.2 km (43.0 mi)).

The trail is chipsealed to Reid Lake, leaving the last 10 km (6.2 mi) as gravel.
