= Gilbert LaBine =

Canadian prospector (1890–1977)

Gilbert LaBine OBE OC
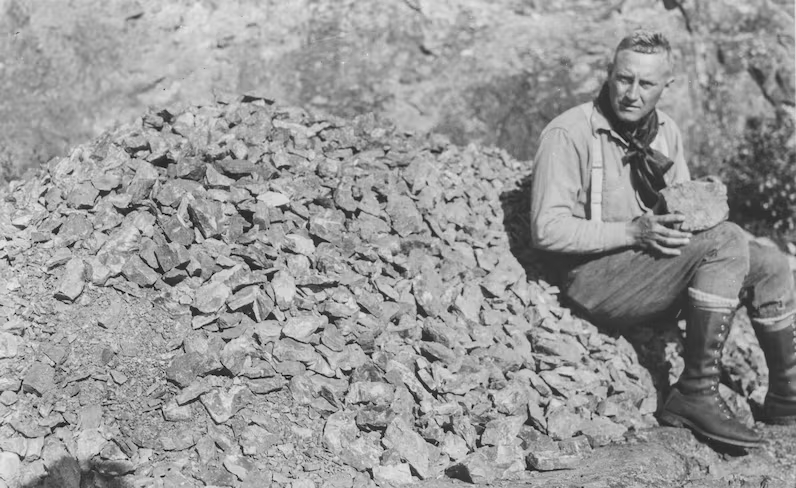
- Gilbert LaBine examining uranium ore at the Eldorado Mine
- Born: Adelard LaBine; 10 February 1890; Westmeath Township, Renfrew County, Ontario, Canada
- Died: 8 June 1977 (aged 87); Toronto, Ontario, Canada
- Occupation: prospector
- Known for: Founding Eldorado Gold Mines

Gilbert A. LaBine, OBE OC (10 February 1890 – 8 June 1977) was a Canadian prospector who, in 1930, discovered radium and uranium deposits at Port Radium, Northwest Territories. LaBine was president of Eldorado Gold Mines (later Eldorado Mining and Refining) from its start in the late 1920s to 1947. He left the company, which had become a Crown corporation in 1944, to prospect for uranium minerals as an independent mine developer. In the 1950s he brought the Gunnar Mine to production at Uranium City, Saskatchewan.

== Early life and education ==
Adélard "Gilbert" LaBine was born on a farm at Westmeath Township, Renfrew County, Ontario, on 10 February 1890. He studied at the Haileybury Provincial School of Mines.

== Career ==
=== Discovery ===
LaBine made his first prospecting strike "in some silver claims near Cobalt" in Northeastern Ontario. He incorporated his own company in 1926 under the name "Eldorado Gold Mines, Limited".

At the end of March 1930, LaBine traveled to Great Bear Lake in the Northwest Territories to do some prospecting. On 16 May, while exploring an island at Echo Bay, LaBine discovered "a very rich deposit of uranium ore".

LaBine stockpiled uranium ore at Great Bear Lake from the time of early production after the staking of the company's first two claims in May 1930. Eldorado's pitchblende (the outcrop of rock containing uranium, cobalt, radium, silver etc.) was refined initially for radium because it traded at a high value and was used for treating cancer. Uranium was a by-product of the refining process, and the company had little use for it. When radium prices dropped, operations slowed down. "By mid-1940, Eldorado's sales totaled less than $8 million and its prospects were not encouraging ... In July, the mine was shut down and allowed to fill with water."

=== War effort and awards ===
By 1944 Canadian Munitions and Supply Minister C. D. Howe had purchased a controlling interest in and expropriated Eldorado Mining Company. Howe authorized LaBine, Eldorado's president, to begin buying the company's stock in secret. Howe considered LaBine to be both a personal friend and a good manager, assuring the British government that he "could be left in control of the company".

According to Peter C. Newman's analysis, financing could not have come from investors, "who would have had to be kept in ignorance of the project's significance". The government had the mine immediately "drained and cemented ... and employed prospectors to search for additional uranium deposits". The miners hired to reopen Eldorado were screened by the RCMP and sworn to secrecy. Given this notion it seems secrecy was conducted the same way uranium contracts had been allocated; efficiency and development of an atomic weapon took precedence over political concerns like communist attitude amongst the workforce or homage to Britain.

According to historian Robert Bothwell, Howe concluded that the issue over Canadian uranium was "of extreme, and permanent, importance. If Eldorado were seized using the government's emergency powers, the company would revert to its original ownership and control when the war emergency lapsed." Because Eldorado was purchased outside the scope of the War Measures Act, Canada remained in control of the mine after the war had ended. Howe left discretionary power in the hands of LaBine, who continued on as manager. LaBine was kept on as Eldorado president until 1947 and made an Officer of the Order of the British Empire "for his war work". LaBine was inducted as an Officer of the Order of Canada on 27 June 1969 in recognition of "his varied contributions to the mining industry in Canada", his last official recognition before his death. He was posthumously inducted into the Canadian Mining Hall of Fame in 1989.

The Northern Transportation Company named the tugboat Radium Gilbert after Labine. She spent her operational career carrying ore and supplies on Great Bear Lake.
