= Saskatchewan Mining Development Corporation =

The Saskatchewan Mining Development Corporation (SMDC) was a provincial crown corporation established in 1974 by the Government of Saskatchewan to manage its interests in exploration and mining in the province. It was active in the exploration for uranium, gold and diamonds.

In 1988, SMDC's assets were merged with those of Eldorado Nuclear Limited, under the terms of The Saskatchewan Mining Development Corporation Reorganization Act, to form Cameco Corporation with its head office in Saskatoon, Saskatchewan.
