= Jericho Diamond Mine =

Diamond mine in Nunavut, Canada

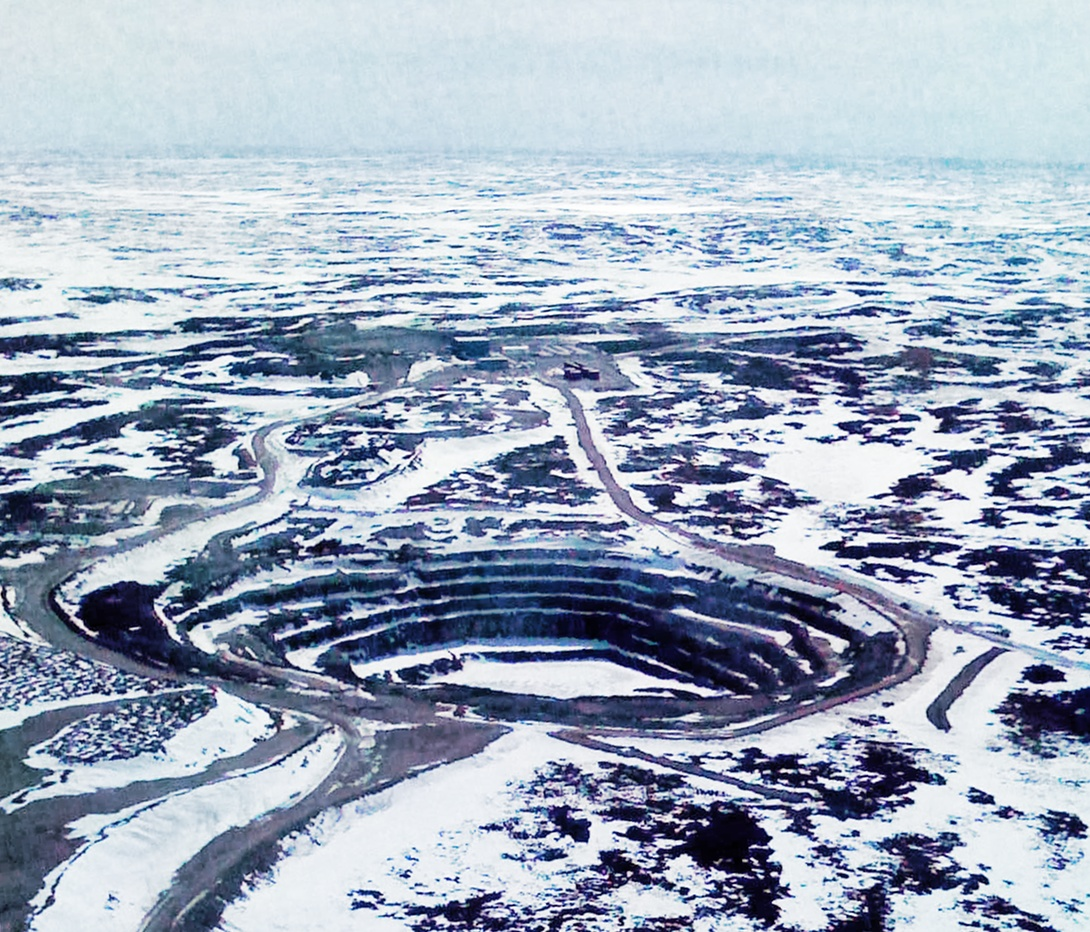
- Jericho Diamond Mine from the air

- Location Jericho Diamond Mine (Canada)
- Location: Nunavut, Canada; 65°59′50″N 111°28′30″W
- Opened: 2006
- Closed: 2008
- Company: Shear Diamonds Ltd.
- Website: www.sheardiamonds.com/jericho.html
- Acquired: 2010

The Jericho Diamond Mine is a dormant diamond mine located in Canada's Nunavut territory. Jericho is Nunavut's first and only diamond mine. It is located 420 km (260 mi) northeast of Yellowknife, Northwest Territories and is accessible by air all year and by winter road from Yellowknife. The project was mined from 2006 to 2008, and produced 780,000 carats (156 kg; 344 lb) of diamonds from 1,200,000 tonnes (1,200,000 long tons; 1,300,000 short tons) of kimberlite mined from the open pit operation. Over $200 million was invested in the development of the Jericho operations including the construction of a 2,000 t (2,000 long tons; 2,200 short tons) per day diamond recovery plant, maintenance facility, fuel farm, and offices and accommodation for 225 personnel.

On July 19, 2010, Shear Diamonds (née Shear Minerals Ltd) (TSX-V: SRM), a diamond exploration company focused on the Nunavut region, announced its purchase of the Jericho Diamond Mine. In late 2010, Shear announced that it would take about a year to devise a plan to reopen the mine. Shear began processing the existing recovery reject pile in early 2012, selling the recovered stones to Belgian diamond firm Taché, which provided a revolving line of credit. However, operations were suspended in September, as Shear, citing "limited funds and significant operations", has sought to minimize expenditures. Taché has given notice of default on certain covenants of their investment agreement, but is working with Shear to find funding or a purchaser.

== Operations ==
The mine was developed, opened and operated by Tahera Diamond Corporation. The company was provided with CAN $35 million loan by Tiffany & Co. to assist in construction of the site, as part of a marketing alliance. The mine produced diamonds from 2006 to February 2008, and was Tahera's only mining operation. The company reported financial losses in 2007 due to operational difficulties, the high value of the Canadian dollar, high oil prices, and the short operating season of the Tibbitt to Contwoyto ice road in 2006. Tahera filed for protection from creditors in January 2008, and the mine stopped recovering diamonds once existing ore stockpiles ran out, one month later.

There is no registered airport at the site, so all heavy equipment had to be brought in by the Tibbitt-to-Contwoyto winter road. Due to the remoteness of the site, the mine was part of the impetus for a proposal to build a port near the community of Bathurst Inlet with a road to both the Diavik Diamond Mine and the Ekati Diamond Mine.

== Production ==
The mine was estimated to be able to produce 375,000 carats (75 kg; 165 lb) a year with a value of CAN $25 million. In the first half of 2006 the mine had processed 210,000 t (210,000 long tons; 230,000 short tons) for 126,918 carats (25 kg; 56 lb).

== See also ==
- Jericho pipe
