= Eldorado Mine (Northwest Territories) =

Radium, silver and uranium mine in Canada

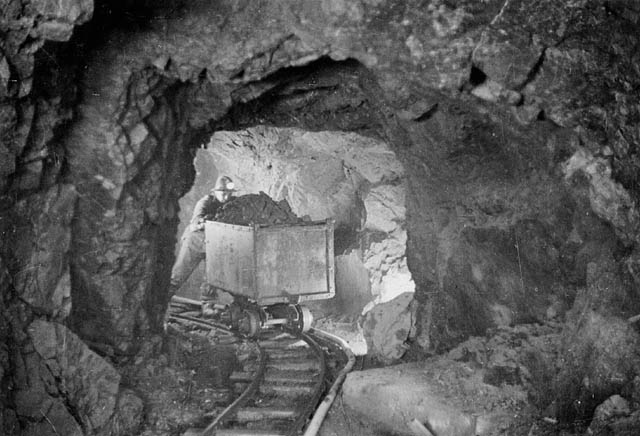
- A miner hauling silver and radium ore from the Eldorado, c. 1930

- Location within Northwest Territories
- Location: Port Radium, Northwest Territories, Canada; 66.085°N 118.038°W
- Products: Radium, Uranium, Silver, Copper
- Discovered: 1930
- Opened: 1932
- Active: 1932-1940; 1942-1960; 1975-1982
- Closed: 1982
- Company: Echo Bay Mines Ltd
- Acquired: 1975

The Eldorado Mine is a defunct mine located in Port Radium, Northwest Territories, Canada. The site, which covers 12 hectares, is located next to Echo Bay in the shore of Great Bear Lake.

The mine was 270 miles by air north of Yellowknife and approximal 850 miles north of Edmonton, on the edge of the Arctic Circle and therefore only accessible by small charter aircraft equipped with floats or skis, or larger charter aircraft flying to the south shore of the lake, followed by a boat journey.

Radium, uranium and silver were extracted from the mine during several working periods between 1932 and 1982. Uranium from Eldorado was used in the Manhattan Project. The Eldorado Mine is also known as Port Radium, a name adopted for use at this specific site after 1942. The name Port Radium had previously referred to the post office and wireless radio station at Cameron Bay.

== History ==
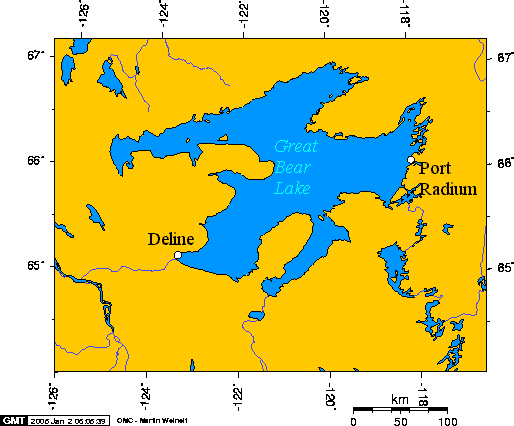
Location of Port Radium, Great Bear Lake, Canada

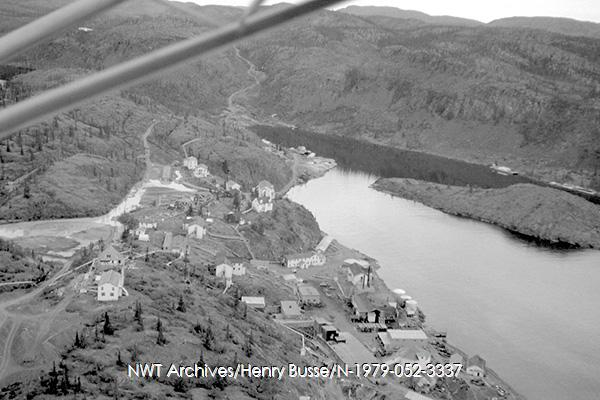
Aerial view of Eldorado Mining and Refining minesite, Port Radium, 1946

During a field trip along the east arm of Great Bear Lake in August 1900, James McIntosh Bell of the Geological Survey of Canada noted evidences of iron, copper, uranium and cobalt in the vicinity of Echo Bay. Thirty years later, on May 16, 1930, prospector Gilbert LaBine discovered high-grade pitchblende and silver at this site. His company was then known as Eldorado Gold Mines Limited (later renamed Eldorado Mining and Refining Limited).

Eldorado started off as a radium mine in 1932, extracting radium from pitchblende. Radium ores were highly valued at the time because the price of radium salts, used in cancer treatment and then monopolized by Belgium, was US$70,000 per gram. The first concentration plant was a big erection at the site by Allis-Chalmers of Canada in 1933–1934, with a radium refinery built at Port Hope, Ontario. Concentrates and cobbed material were shipped by barge and airplane to rail head at Fort McMurray, Alberta, then by train to Port Hope.

In 1940 the mine closed because of the expansion of European markets for radium. In 1939, at the beginning of World War II, ore from Eldorado had been used in the first chain reaction experiments, and as soon as the scientists had found out that these ores contained a rich store of uranium oxide and were useful as a source of nuclear energy. Gilbert LaBine's company was able to secure a contract with the United States military early in 1942. The Eldorado Mine at Port Radium was secretly expropriated and transferred to the Canadian Government in 1943-1944 and renamed Eldorado Mining and Refining Limited. Uranium ore from the mine was used in the atomic bomb developments of 1945.

Uranium mining continued after World War II. The mine was expensive to operate and grade of the ore was declining, so new technology was brought in to make the isolated mine profitable. The discarded tailings were dredged from the bay when new machinery was installed to recover the uranium content. The underground workings were deepened and the crown corporation sought out additional deposits of uranium across Canada. But in 1960 the original Eldorado Mine was exhausted and closed.

In 1975 the Eldorado Mine was dewatered by Echo Bay Mines Limited to recover old silver and copper minerals. All activity ceased in 1982 and Eldorado Mine and the Port Radium settlement was burned and demolished.

In 1984 the site was decommissioned as per local standards at the time.

In 2006 an agreement was made with the local Deline community about remediation activities, which were completed in 2007.

On 31 December 2016, the Canadian Nuclear Safety Commission issued a 10-year license (therefore running until 31 December 2026) to Crown-Indigenous Relations and Northern Affairs Canada permitting long term monitoring and maintenance of the site.

The mine is inspected by the Canadian Nuclear Safety Commission once every three years. The COVID-19 pandemic delayed the 2020 inspection until February 2022.

== Geology ==
The Early Proterozoic Echo Bay Group consists of tuffs, flow rocks, argillite, quartzite, and dolomitic limestone. Uranium ore deposits occur within veins and stockworks which cut through this group, mainly along four parallel fault zones aligned roughly southwest–northeast from Great Bear Lake. The age of uranium mineralization is about 1,400 Ma.

== Bibliography ==
- Bond, Fred C. (2011), Bond, Laurie J. (ed.), It Happened to Me, Bruce F. Bond.
- Bothwell, Robert (1984), Eldorado, Canada's National Uranium Company, Toronto: University of Toronto Press, ISBN 0-8020-3414-4.
