= Eldorado Resources =

- Formerly: Eldorado Gold Mines Ltd.; Eldorado Mining & Refining Ltd.; Eldorado Nuclear
- Type: Crown corporation
- Industry: Mining
- Founded: 1926; 100 years ago
- Founders: Gilbert LaBine; Charles LaBine
- Defunct: 1988
- Fate: Merged with Saskatchewan Mining Development Corporation
- Successors: Canada Eldor Inc.; Cameco
- Owner: Government of Canada

Eldorado Resources was a Canadian mining company active between 1926 and 1988. The company was originally established by brothers Charles and Gilbert LaBine as a gold mining enterprise in 1926, but transitioned to focus on radium in the 1930s and uranium beginning in the 1940s. The company was nationalized into a Crown corporation in 1943 when the Canadian federal government purchased share control. Eldorado Resources was merged with the Saskatchewan Mining Development Corporation in 1988 and the resulting entity was privatized as Cameco Corporation. The remediation of some mining sites and low-level nuclear waste continues to be overseen by the Government of Canada through Canada Eldor Inc., a subsidiary of the Canada Development Investment Corporation.

== History ==
Eldorado was originally established as Eldorado Gold Mines but, after finding radioactive deposits at Great Bear Lake, Northwest Territories in 1930, the company transitioned to primarily mining radioactive materials. Gilbert LaBine directed the company's development of the Eldorado Mine at Port Radium, Northwest Territories and built a state-of-the-art radium refinery in Port Hope, Ontario in 1933. In addition to radium, Eldorado also produced silver, copper, and uranium salts.

Radium production halted in 1940 when World War II closed European markets for radium material. Uranium was useless until scientists realized the enormous energy potential of the uranium atom. The company reopened the mine at Port Radium in 1942 to supply the United States military with uranium products. The Government of Canada nationalized the company by purchasing share control in 1943. and in early 1944 the name was changed to Eldorado Mining and Refining Limited.

In mid-1943 the District Engineer of the Manhattan Engineer District, Lt-Col Kenneth Nichols had several queries from Canada relating to contracts Canadian firms Eldorado Gold Mines and Consolidated Mining and Smelting (CMS) had for the secret atomic bomb project; CMS or Cominco was building a heavy water plant at Trail, British Columbia and Eldorado was mining and processing uranium ore. He phoned C. D. Howe in Ottawa and arranged to travel on the overnight train to Ottawa and see Howe the next day (June 14). On arriving at the address given Nichols was surprised to find that Howe was the minister of munitions and supply, and found him most friendly. Howe was told about the Manhattan Project, and Nichols was told that Eldorado was now a Crown company.

The Crown corporation held a monopoly on uranium prospecting and development in Canada until 1948. Together with a discovery of the Port Radium deposits, the Eldorado company opened the Beaverlodge Mine at Uranium City, Saskatchewan. It entered production in 1953. In the 1960s the nature of sales changed when the United States military ceased purchasing of Canadian uranium ores for the purpose of atomic weapons, and from then on uranium was produced for power plants. During this period the name of the company was changed to Eldorado Nuclear Limited, with Eldorado Aviation Limited operating flights to Port Radium.

The Eldorado corporate records are housed in the National Archives of Canada.

== Port Hope, Ontario ==
Port Hope has the largest volume of historic low-level radioactive wastes in Canada, created by Eldorado Mining and Refining Limited and its private sector predecessors. According to their 2014 report, the Canadian Parliamentary Budget Officer (PBO) noted that the liability for the Port Hope, Ontario contaminated site was $1 billion, whereas the Big Five other contaminated sites (namely Faro mine, Colomac mine, Giant mine, Cape Dyer-DEW line, Goose Bay Air Base) had a combined liability of $1.8 billion.

In 2012, the Government of Canada allocated $1.28 billion towards waste management efforts, which as of 2022 has increased to $2.6 billion. With the goal of removing around 1.2 million cubic meters of low-level radioactive waste, this initiative is the largest such cleanup in Canadian history, which is projected to be completed in 2032.

== Former mine sites (partial list) ==
- Eldorado Mine (Northwest Territories)
- Umisk Island
