= Echo Bay Mines =

Canadian mining company

Coordinates: 66.05511°N 118.000088°W

- Industry: Mining
- Founded: 1964; 62 years ago Canada

Echo Bay Mines Limited was a Canadian company which was organized in 1964 by Northwest Explorers Limited to develop a silver deposit at Great Bear Lake, Northwest Territories, Canada, which had been staked in 1930 by The Consolidated Mining and Smelting Company (now called Teck Resources). The company leased the old Port Radium settlement from Eldorado Mining and Refining Limited and used the old camp and mill to recover silver and copper values from what became known as the Echo Bay Mine. Production in the Echo Bay workings ceased in 1975. The company then reopened the old Eldorado Mine workings and produced more silver and copper until 1981, when low silver prices caused the mine to close permanently.

Echo Bay Mines Limited went on to open a new gold mine, called Lupin Mine, in what was then the Northwest Territories and is today in Nunavut. It entered production in 1982.

Echo Bay Mines Limited developed numerous other properties, mostly in the United States, including two mines in Nevada, McCoy/Cove and Round Mountain gold mine, and the Kettle River mine in Washington. Corporate headquarters were in Englewood, Colorado. In 1986 the company purchased Sunnyside Gold Mine in Silverton, Colorado, and operated it for five years before it closed because of low gold prices.

The company became a subsidiary of Kinross Gold Corporation in 2003 and has been delisted from the stock exchange.
