= Tibbitt Lake =

Lake in the Northwest Territories, Canada

- Location within Northwest Territories
- Location: Northwest Territories
- Coordinates: 62.554°N 113.350°W
- Basin countries: Canada

Tibbitt Lake is a lake in the Canadian Northwest Territories.

Located 69.2 kilometres (43.0 mi) east of Yellowknife, the lake marks the northern terminus of the Ingraham Trail. In winter, an ice road known as the Tibbitt to Contwoyto Winter Road extends from the end of the Ingraham Trail to Contwoyto Lake in Nunavut, forming the latter territory's only road access to the rest of Canada. The lake is named after John Francis Tibbitt, a field geologist who mapped the Yellowknife area with the Geological Survey of Canada in 1935.
