= Yellowknife River =

River near Yellowknife, Northwest Territories, Canada

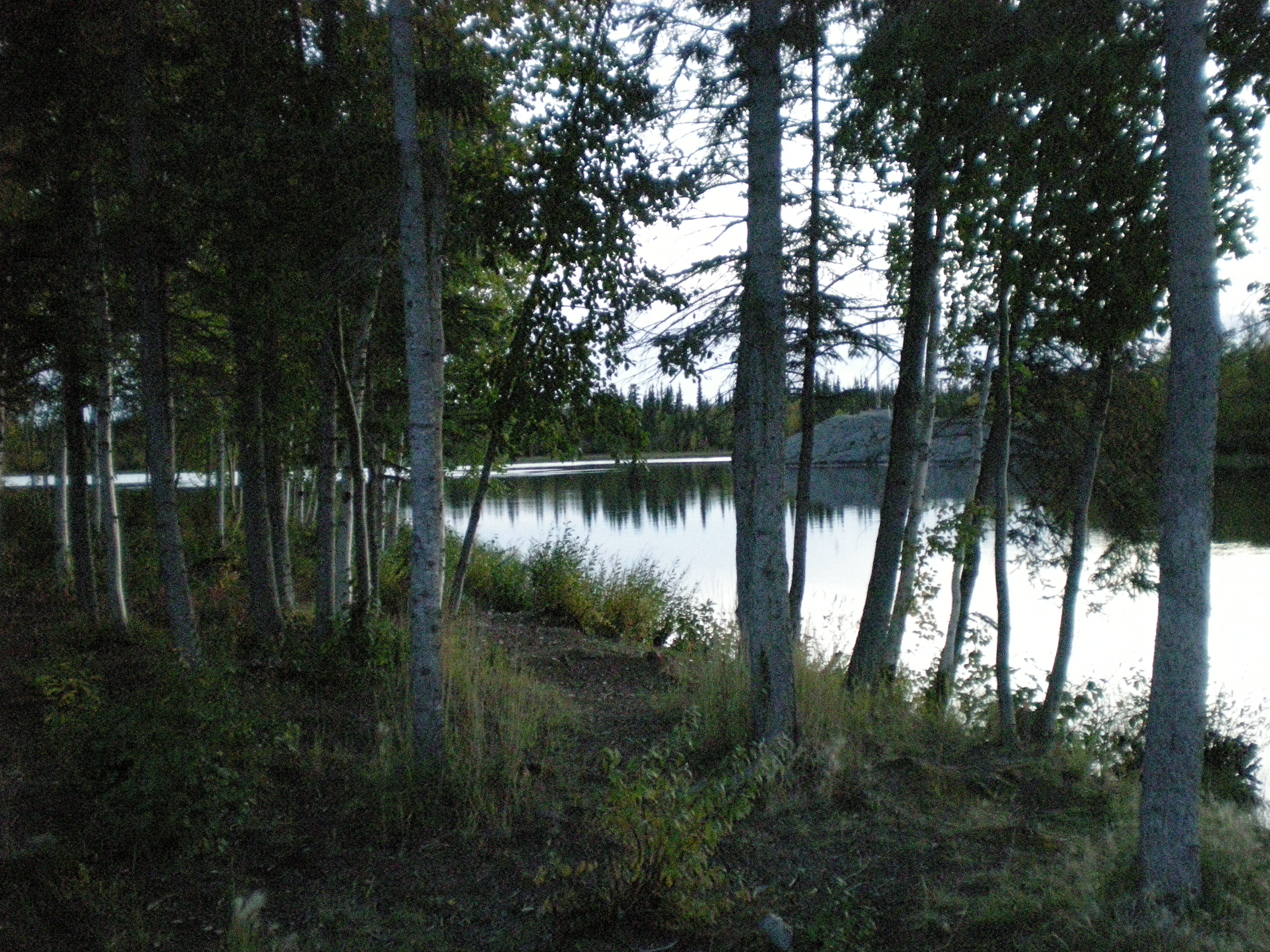
- Yellowknife River looking downstream near where it flows under the Ingraham Trail

- Location of mouth Yellowknife River (Canada)
- Native name: Wíílíídeh (Tlicho)

Location
- Country: Canada
- Province: Northwest Territories

Physical characteristics
- Mouth
  - location: Great Slave Lake,
  - coordinates: 62°31′04″N 114°19′17″W

Basin features
- River system: Mackenzie River

The Yellowknife River is a river in the Northwest Territories, Canada. It flows south and empties into Yellowknife Bay just where it is crossed by the Ingraham Trail. It is part of Great Slave Lake, approximately 7.5 km (4.7 mi) north northeast of the city of Yellowknife. The lake is drained by the Mackenzie River into the Arctic Ocean as part of the largest drainage basin in Canada. The name of the river derives from the Yellowknives, a First Nations people who have lived in the area for thousands of years. The Dene had tools made of copper and the name reflects the colour of the tools.

The city of Yellowknife draws its water supply from the river and, in an emergency, Yellowknife Bay.

== See also ==
- List of rivers of the Northwest Territories
