= Port Radium =

Former mining town in Northwest Territories, Canada

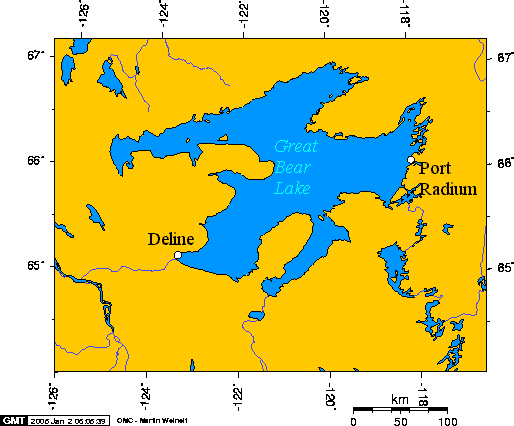
Great Bear Lake, NWT, Canada

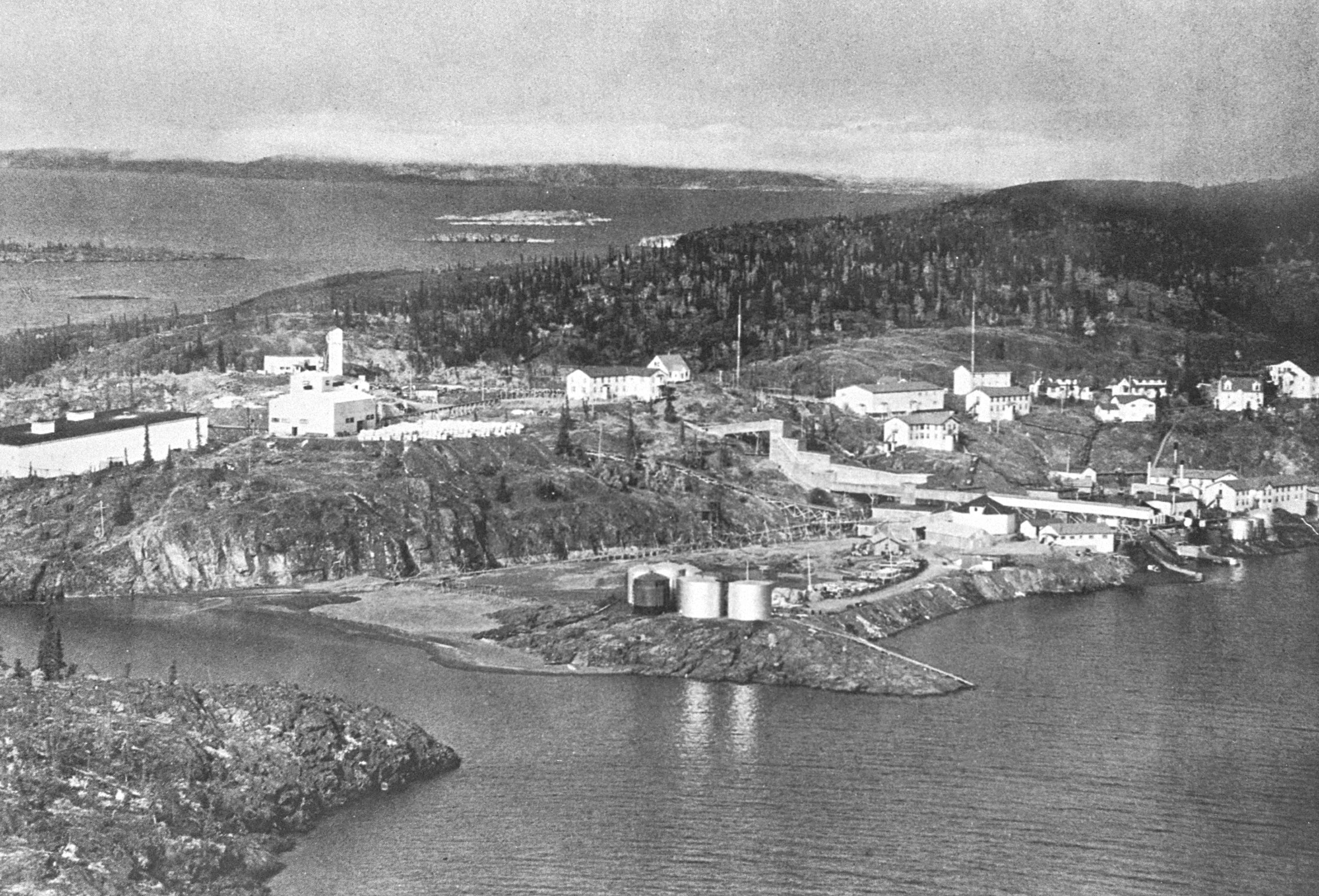
Oblique aerial view circa 1930

Port Radium is a mining area on the eastern shore of Great Bear Lake, Northwest Territories, Canada. It included the settlement of Cameron Bay as well as the Eldorado (also called Port Radium) and Echo Bay mines. The name Port Radium did not come into use until 1936 and at the time it was in reference to the region as a whole. The Eldorado mine site at LaBine Point adopted the name for its settlement in the 1940s and it has generally stuck.

== Location ==
Port Radium is situated at 66°05′11″N 118°02′21″W on LaBine Point on the McTavish Arm of Great Bear Lake.

Cameron Bay is situated 7.25 km (4.50 mi) southeast at 66°04′01″N 117°52′06″W and Port Radium Airport is at 66°06′N 117°56′W between the two to the north and consisted of a gravel airstrip next to Glacier Lake.

== History ==
Federal census population history of Port Radium
Year	Pop.	±%
1941	9	—
1951	311	+3355.6%
1981	56	−82.0%
Source: Statistics Canada

During a field trip along the east arm of Great Bear Lake in August 1900, James McIntosh Bell of the Geological Survey of Canada noted evidences of iron, copper, uranium and cobalt in the vicinity of Echo Bay. Thirty years later, a prospector Gilbert LaBine discovered high-grade pitchblende and silver. His company was Eldorado Mining and Refining Limited, then known as Eldorado Gold Mines Limited. Radium ores were highly valued at the time because the price of radium salts, used in cancer treatment, and which was monopolized by Belgium, was $70,000 per gram.

Several settlements popped up in the 1930s in this area. Eldorado Mine became the first producing venture and it had its own private camp for its employees. There were also operations at the Elbonanza silver property, at White Eagle on the Camsell River, and at Contact Lake. In 1932 prospectors and businesses settled down in a protective cove off Echo Bay, known as Cameron Bay. By 1933 the Canadian Government had surveyed a townsite. At its peak the Cameron Bay settlement had 100 permanent residents, and the Port Radium area as a whole probably boasted 200+ residents. But by 1934 all the important deposits had been staked and activity died down. The Eldorado Mine at LaBine Point entered production in 1933 and the Contact Lake silver mine followed in 1936. At Cameron Bay, the government established a post office, a government office, and a radio station. There was also a Royal Canadian Mounted Police post and a Hudson's Bay Company post. In 1936, the government facilities were rechristened Port Radium to glorify the nature of the nearby mining operations.

The Cameron Bay area was officially renamed Port Radium in 1937. At that time, Cameron Bay had a population of 30. In the 1930s, Port Radium was home to an annual arctic dogsled race.

With the closure of the Eldorado Mine in June 1940, and the general lack of activity, the government closed up the offices at Cameron Bay, and except for a few native families that occupied the abandoned buildings, Port Radium was empty. When the Eldorado Mine reopened in 1942 to supply uranium ores for the effort of World War II, the mine settlement adopted the name Port Radium. Cameron Bay remained abandoned, but later in the 1960s Branson's Lodge built a fishing lodge on the site.

The Eldorado Mine became the only remaining operation in the Port Radium area after 1942. Port Radium was occupied from 1942 to 1960 while the Eldorado Mine was producing uranium, then again between 1964 and 1982 when Echo Bay Mines Limited produced silver from the so-called Echo Bay Mine, and the Eldorado Mine. When the mine finally closed in 1982, Echo Bay burned down the remaining buildings with few exceptions. In 2007, the Canadian Federal government completed the remediation at Port Radium by removing all remaining infrastructure.

A cairn and plaque at Labine Point are the only remains of Port Radium. The old RCMP log cabin post was dismantled log by log in 2007, and rebuilt in Norman Wells by Rick Muyres.

An early case in the Aboriginal rights movement involved the Eldorado Mine's alleged discrimination against First Nations and Inuit workers, such as giving them the last priority when establishing safety services. The Native Sisterhood made it a national political issue in Canada, and sparked the more famous native-rights activism in Alaska during the 1940s. The case faded in Port Radium itself after the closing of the Eldorado Mine, however, and did not return to the forefront until the 1980s, when some former mine workers developed health problems that were said to have been due to radium toxicity, a result of their failure to receive radioactivity protection coats containing lead. The government finally settled the case by providing treatment for the patients, and working with mine policy to ensure that similar injustices were not happening at the present and would not be allowed to happen in the future. A report was released in 2005 challenging the link between uranium mining and cancer at Port Radium. Dr. Douglas Chambers told the Canadian Broadcasting Corporation that "The potential risk of cancer associated with transporting the ore concentrate is extremely small, and in fact so small it would not be detectable in the variability of natural cancers and factors of effect cancers such as smoking."

== Climate ==
Port Radium is located near the Arctic Circle, which means that in December the sun almost does not rise and in June it does not set for 24 hours. The average temperature is −7.1 °C (19.2 °F), the prevailing wind direction is southeast.

Between 1950 and 1974, this climatic data was collected at Port Radium:

Climate data for Port Radium (1951−1980 normals, extremes 1937−1974)
Month	Jan	Feb	Mar	Apr	May	Jun	Jul	Aug	Sep	Oct	Nov	Dec	Year
Record high °C (°F)	0.6 (33.1)	3.3 (37.9)	6.1 (43.0)	14.4 (57.9)	26.7 (80.1)	30.6 (87.1)	30.0 (86.0)	29.4 (84.9)	23.9 (75.0)	16.7 (62.1)	7.8 (46.0)	1.1 (34.0)	30.6 (87.1)
Mean daily maximum °C (°F)	−23.8 (−10.8)	−22.5 (−8.5)	−16.9 (1.6)	−5.2 (22.6)	6.0 (42.8)	14.6 (58.3)	17.0 (62.6)	14.2 (57.6)	7.6 (45.7)	−0.6 (30.9)	−11.5 (11.3)	−19.5 (−3.1)	−3.4 (25.9)
Daily mean °C (°F)	−27.6 (−17.7)	−26.1 (−15.0)	−20.5 (−4.9)	−9.8 (14.4)	1.7 (35.1)	9.9 (49.8)	12.4 (54.3)	10.9 (51.6)	4.8 (40.6)	−3.2 (26.2)	−14.6 (5.7)	−22.7 (−8.9)	−7.1 (19.2)
Mean daily minimum °C (°F)	−30.9 (−23.6)	−29.9 (−21.8)	−24.9 (−12.8)	−14.4 (6.1)	−2.7 (27.1)	5.2 (41.4)	7.9 (46.2)	7.3 (45.1)	2.1 (35.8)	−5.6 (21.9)	−17.6 (0.3)	−25.9 (−14.6)	−10.8 (12.6)
Record low °C (°F)	−47.8 (−54.0)	−47.2 (−53.0)	−43.9 (−47.0)	−38.3 (−36.9)	−26.1 (−15.0)	−6.1 (21.0)	−1.1 (30.0)	−2.8 (27.0)	−9.4 (15.1)	−21.7 (−7.1)	−41.1 (−42.0)	−49.4 (−56.9)	−49.4 (−56.9)
Average precipitation mm (inches)	10.3 (0.41)	8.0 (0.31)	11.6 (0.46)	9.5 (0.37)	13.5 (0.53)	11.3 (0.44)	30.2 (1.19)	36.7 (1.44)	22.5 (0.89)	24.8 (0.98)	21.3 (0.84)	14.6 (0.57)	216.3 (8.52)
Average rainfall mm (inches)	0.0 (0.0)	0.0 (0.0)	0.0 (0.0)	0.0 (0.0)	12.5 (0.49)	10.0 (0.39)	30.0 (1.18)	38.6 (1.52)	19.2 (0.76)	4.0 (0.16)	0.0 (0.0)	0.0 (0.0)	114.3 (4.50)
Average snowfall cm (inches)	14.3 (5.6)	11.4 (4.5)	13.2 (5.2)	9.6 (3.8)	2.3 (0.9)	3.6 (1.4)	0.3 (0.1)	0.0 (0.0)	1.7 (0.7)	23.2 (9.1)	27.7 (10.9)	17.7 (7.0)	125.0 (49.2)
Average precipitation days (≥ 0.2 mm)	11	9	10	7	5	5	7	9	9	13	15	10	110
Average rainy days (≥ 0.2 mm)	0	0	0	0	3	5	7	9	7	2	0	0	33
Average snowy days (≥ 0.2 cm)	12	9	9	7	2	1	0	0	2	11	15	12	80
Source: ECCC

Month	Jan	Feb	Mar	Apr	May	Jun	Jul	Aug	Sep	Oct	Nov	Dec	Year
Bright sunshine (hours)	0.19	1.82	7.57	16.03	21.76	23.16	18.54	11.97	6.20	2.85	0.39	0.00	10
Source: DFO
