= Lupin Mine =

Gold mine in Nunavut, Canada

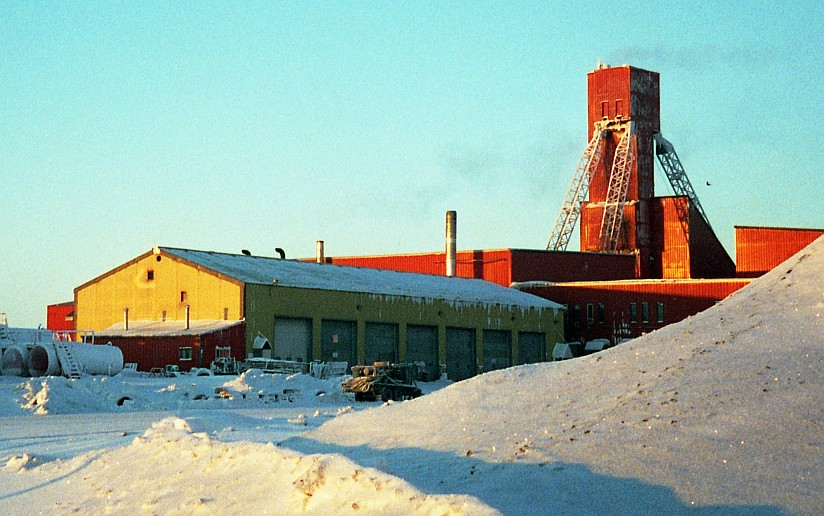

- Location in Canada
- Location: Nunavut, Canada; 65°45′49″N 111°13′15″W
- Opened: 1982

Lupin (Lupin Mine in full) was a gold mine in Kitikmeot Region Nunavut, Canada.

== History ==
The deposit was first discovered by Canadian Nickel Company Ltd, a subsidiary of Inco Limited, during its reconnaissance sampling and mapping activities in 1960. Additional exploration activities were performed between 1961 and 1964. In February 1979, Echo Bay Mines received permission from Inco to perform underground exploration program. The ores from Lupin Mine generally contained slightly more than average amount of gold per ton of rock. The operation lifespan of the mine was estimated to be six years. The decision to move forward to construct the mine was made in August 1980. A 360 metres (1,180 ft) vertical mine shaft was initially constructed.

Lupin mine opened in 1982 and was originally owned and operated by Echo Bay Mines, who in 2003 became a fully owned subsidiary of Kinross Gold Corporation. Approximately 20-25 miners worked on 12-hour shifts. Amenities for the mine workers included a recreational centre with satellite television, racquetball court, sauna, weight room and library. Alcohol was banned at the mine. While food and mine workers were flown in by plane through Lupin Airport, fuel, chemicals and explosives were transported to the mine each winter through Tibbitt to Contwoyto Winter Road. The mine shaft was later extended to 1,210 metres (3,970 ft) beneath the surface in 1990.

The mine ceased production briefly in August 2003, but was restarted in early 2004 to recover old stope pillars with a reduced crew. The mine closed again in February 2005 and, in 2006, the assets were sold to Wolfden Resources Limited (later MMG, Ltd.) and subsequently to Elgin Mining, Inc. of Canada in July 2011. Elgin states that the mine is currently on care and maintenance due to the low price of gold, and that "The mill and all associated infrastructure was properly decommissioned and are in good condition for re-commencement of operations" should market conditions prove favourable.

In January 2015 WPC Resources of Vancouver optioned the property from Toronto-based Mandalay Resources who had purchased Elgin Assets.

Although mining activities are currently paused, the mine is still being accessible by road during winter through Tibbitt to Contwoyto Winter Road.

== Geology ==
The lode-containing gold deposit are from Neoarchean era with banded iron formation rocks.

== Climate ==
Lupin has a subarctic climate (Köppen: Dfc; Trewartha: Ecld) dominated by the cold and prolonged winter. Summers are short, but mild enough to bring it above a polar classification.

Climate data for Lupin MIne (Lupin Airport) Climate ID: 23026HN; coordinates 65°45′33″N 111°15′00″W; elevation: 490.1 m (1,608 ft); 1991–2020 normals, extremes 1982–present
Month	Jan	Feb	Mar	Apr	May	Jun	Jul	Aug	Sep	Oct	Nov	Dec	Year
Record high humidex	5.8	−0.3	0.3	6.3	17.5	28.6	35.3	33.3	21.7	15.5	1.4	0.0	35.3
Record high °C (°F)	−3.6 (25.5)	−1.2 (29.8)	0.5 (32.9)	6.0 (42.8)	17.8 (64.0)	28.0 (82.4)	31.0 (87.8)	29.8 (85.6)	21.0 (69.8)	13.0 (55.4)	0.0 (32.0)	−4.5 (23.9)	31.0 (87.8)
Mean daily maximum °C (°F)	−25.3 (−13.5)	−24.7 (−12.5)	−20.3 (−4.5)	−11.3 (11.7)	−0.9 (30.4)	11.9 (53.4)	17.1 (62.8)	13.3 (55.9)	5.5 (41.9)	−5.2 (22.6)	−15.7 (3.7)	−22.3 (−8.1)	−6.5 (20.3)
Daily mean °C (°F)	−28.9 (−20.0)	−28.3 (−18.9)	−24.2 (−11.6)	−15.7 (3.7)	−5.0 (23.0)	7.1 (44.8)	12.0 (53.6)	9.3 (48.7)	2.6 (36.7)	−7.7 (18.1)	−19.1 (−2.4)	−25.7 (−14.3)	−10.3 (13.5)
Mean daily minimum °C (°F)	−32.4 (−26.3)	−31.3 (−24.3)	−28.0 (−18.4)	−20.4 (−4.7)	−8.6 (16.5)	2.4 (36.3)	7.0 (44.6)	5.4 (41.7)	−0.3 (31.5)	−10.1 (13.8)	−22.5 (−8.5)	−29.1 (−20.4)	−14.0 (6.8)
Record low °C (°F)	−49.0 (−56.2)	−46.0 (−50.8)	−44.0 (−47.2)	−38.0 (−36.4)	−29.5 (−21.1)	−9.0 (15.8)	−1.5 (29.3)	−6.5 (20.3)	−13.5 (7.7)	−30.5 (−22.9)	−40.5 (−40.9)	−42.0 (−43.6)	−49.0 (−56.2)
Record low wind chill	−62.5	−63.3	−67.4	−51.8	−35.7	−17.8	−6.9	−12.4	−22.4	−40.7	−56.9	−60.8	−67.4
Average precipitation mm (inches)	8.0 (0.31)	7.5 (0.30)	14.0 (0.55)	15.4 (0.61)	18.7 (0.74)	28.7 (1.13)	38.4 (1.51)	67.2 (2.65)	43.7 (1.72)	29.9 (1.18)	17.8 (0.70)	14.2 (0.56)	303.5 (11.95)
Average rainfall mm (inches)	0.0 (0.0)	0.0 (0.0)	0.0 (0.0)	0.6 (0.02)	4.8 (0.19)	25.1 (0.99)	38.1 (1.50)	65.4 (2.57)	25.7 (1.01)	0.9 (0.04)	0.0 (0.0)	0.0 (0.0)	160.5 (6.32)
Average snowfall cm (inches)	8.0 (3.1)	7.9 (3.1)	14.0 (5.5)	14.9 (5.9)	13.8 (5.4)	3.7 (1.5)	0.3 (0.1)	1.9 (0.7)	17.9 (7.0)	29.0 (11.4)	17.8 (7.0)	14.2 (5.6)	143.3 (56.4)
Average precipitation days (≥ 0.2 mm)	8.7	7.8	11.1	9.4	8.9	8.8	11.8	16.3	15.2	18.4	14.8	10.7	141.7
Average rainy days (≥ 0.2 mm)	0.0	0.0	0.0	0.25	2.3	7.6	11.8	15.6	8.6	1.0	0.0	0.0	47.2
Average snowy days (≥ 0.2 cm)	8.7	7.8	11.1	9.3	7.6	2.0	0.44	1.4	8.4	17.9	14.8	10.7	100.2
Average relative humidity (%) (at 1500 LST)	74.1	—	77.9	81.1	77.8	59.4	53.9	63.6	74.6	86.0	82.4	76.9	—
Source: Environment and Climate Change Canada Canadian Climate Normals 1991–2020
