= Government of Nunavut =

Canadian territorial government

- Territorial Government

Overview
- Established: 1 April 1999
- Country: Canada
- Polity: Federal territory
- Leader: Premier; John Main
- Appointed by: Commissioner; Eva Aariak
- Main organ: Executive Council
- Responsible to: Legislative Assembly of Nunavut
- Annual budget: CA$3,100,000,000
- Headquarters: Iqaluit
- Website: www.gov.nu.ca/en

The Government of Nunavut (Inuinnaqtun: Nunavut Kavamanga; French: gouvernement du Nunavut) is the body responsible for the administration of the Canadian territory of Nunavut. In modern Canadian use, the term Government of Nunavut refers specifically to the executive—political ministers of the Crown (the Cabinet/Executive Council) who are appointed on the advice of the premier. Ministers direct the non-partisan civil service, who staff ministries and agencies to deliver government policies, programs, and services. The executive corporately brands itself as the Government of Nunavut.

Nunavut operates as a consensus government. The premier of Nunavut is elected by the Legislative Assembly and ministers are selected by the Legislative Assembly, but their portfolios are assigned by the Premier.

== Role of the federal government ==
The powers of the Crown are vested in the federal government and are exercised by the commissioner of Nunavut. The advice of the premier and Executive Council is typically binding.

=== Commissioner ===
The Commissioner is appointed by the prime minister of Canada. Thus, it is typically the commissioner whom the premier and ministers advise, exercising much of the prerogative and granting assent. The executive power is vested in the Crown and exercised "in-Council", meaning on the advice of the Executive Council; conventionally, this is the Cabinet, which is chaired by the premier and comprises ministers of the Crown.

== Premier and Executive Council ==
The term Government of Nunavut, refers to the activities of the Commissioner. The day-to-day operation and activities of the Government of Nunavut are performed by the territorial departments and agencies, staffed by the non-partisan public service, and directed by the elected government.

=== Premier ===
The premier of Nunavut is the primary minister of the Crown. The premier acts as the head of government for the territory, chairs Cabinet, and advises the Commissioner on the exercise of executive power and much of the powers of prerogative. The premier has no powers to dismiss ministers. Once sworn in, the premier holds office until either they resign or removed by the Commissioner after either a motion of no confidence or defeat in their constituency in a general election.

== See also ==
- Politics of Nunavut
