= Contwoyto Lake =

Lake in Nunavut, Canada

- Location in Nunavut Contwoyto Lake (Canada)
- Location: Kitikmeot Region, Nunavut
- Coordinates: 65°39′N 110°43′W
- Primary outflows: Burnside River
- Basin countries: Canada
- Surface area: 957 km^{2} (369 sq mi)
- Shore length^{1}: 982 km (610 mi)
- Surface elevation: 564 m (1,850 ft)
- Settlements: uninhabited
- ^{1} Shore length is not a well-defined measure.

Contwoyto Lake is a lake in the Kitikmeot Region of the Canadian territory of Nunavut, located near the border with the Northwest Territories. With a total area of 957 km^{2} (369 sq mi), it is the territories' tenth largest lake.

Lupin Mine is located near Contwoyto Lake. The lake is also the terminus of the Tibbitt to Contwoyto Winter Road from Tibbitt Lake in the Northwest Territories, Nunavut's only currently existing road access to the rest of Canada. In 2005, there was a proposal put forward to extend the winter road to a possible port at Bathurst Inlet.

== Climate ==
Climate data for Contwoyto Lake
Month	Jan	Feb	Mar	Apr	May	Jun	Jul	Aug	Sep	Oct	Nov	Dec	Year
Record high °C (°F)	−2.4 (27.7)	−6.4 (20.5)	−2.8 (27.0)	5.6 (42.1)	16.7 (62.1)	24.4 (75.9)	27.2 (81.0)	26.0 (78.8)	16.7 (62.1)	8.3 (46.9)	0.0 (32.0)	6.1 (43.0)	27.2 (81.0)
Mean daily maximum °C (°F)	−27.9 (−18.2)	−26.9 (−16.4)	−22.6 (−8.7)	−11.9 (10.6)	−0.9 (30.4)	9.5 (49.1)	14.9 (58.8)	12.8 (55.0)	4.7 (40.5)	−4.9 (23.2)	−16.4 (2.5)	−24.1 (−11.4)	−7.8 (18.0)
Daily mean °C (°F)	−31.4 (−24.5)	−30.6 (−23.1)	−27.2 (−17.0)	−17.2 (1.0)	−5.2 (22.6)	4.8 (40.6)	9.9 (49.8)	9.0 (48.2)	2.0 (35.6)	−7.5 (18.5)	−20.1 (−4.2)	−27.5 (−17.5)	−11.8 (10.8)
Mean daily minimum °C (°F)	−35.1 (−31.2)	−34.4 (−29.9)	−32.1 (−25.8)	−22.7 (−8.9)	−9.6 (14.7)	0.0 (32.0)	4.8 (40.6)	5.2 (41.4)	−0.8 (30.6)	−10.2 (13.6)	−23.9 (−11.0)	−31.0 (−23.8)	−15.8 (3.6)
Record low °C (°F)	−48.1 (−54.6)	−53.9 (−65.0)	−53.3 (−63.9)	−41.6 (−42.9)	−33.9 (−29.0)	−13.9 (7.0)	−2.2 (28.0)	−3.2 (26.2)	−11.9 (10.6)	−34.4 (−29.9)	−42.6 (−44.7)	−46.7 (−52.1)	−53.9 (−65.0)
Average precipitation mm (inches)	7.0 (0.28)	7.8 (0.31)	10.2 (0.40)	11.2 (0.44)	18.3 (0.72)	25.1 (0.99)	36.2 (1.43)	41.1 (1.62)	32.7 (1.29)	30.6 (1.20)	15.7 (0.62)	10.6 (0.42)	246.6 (9.71)
Average rainfall mm (inches)	0.0 (0.0)	0.0 (0.0)	0.0 (0.0)	0.5 (0.02)	6.2 (0.24)	22.2 (0.87)	36.2 (1.43)	40.1 (1.58)	21.5 (0.85)	2.0 (0.08)	0.0 (0.0)	0.0 (0.0)	128.6 (5.06)
Average snowfall cm (inches)	7.0 (2.8)	7.8 (3.1)	10.2 (4.0)	10.7 (4.2)	12.1 (4.8)	2.9 (1.1)	0.0 (0.0)	1.1 (0.4)	10.8 (4.3)	28.6 (11.3)	15.7 (6.2)	10.6 (4.2)	117.5 (46.3)
Average precipitation days (≥ 0.2 mm)	7	7	9	9	10	8	11	13	12	15	11	9	122
Average rainy days (≥ 0.2 mm)	0	0	0	—	3	6	11	13	7	1	0	0	41
Average snowy days (≥ 0.2 cm)	7	7	9	8	8	2	—	—	6	15	11	9	84
Source 1: 1961-1990 Environment and Climate Change Canada
Source 2:

== See also ==
- List of lakes of Canada
