= Yellowknives =

Indigenous peoples of the Northwest Territories, Canada

Tetsǫ́t'ınę
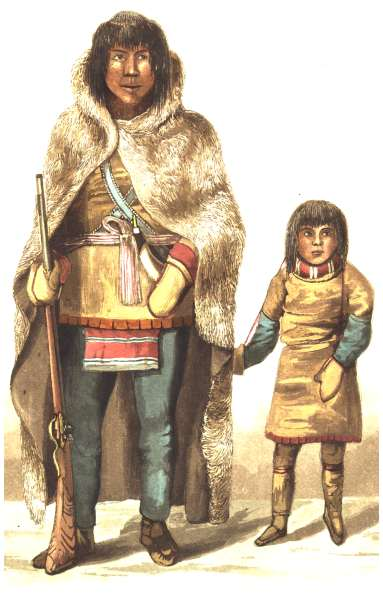
- Portrait of Yellowknife chief Akaitcho and his only son, by Robert Hood 1821.

Regions with significant populations
- Northwest Territories, Canada

Languages
- English, Wıı̀lıı̀deh Yatıı̀ and Tetsǫ́t’ıné Yatıé

Religion
- Christianity

Related ethnic groups
- Tłı̨chǫ, Dënesųłiné, Dene, Sahtu

The Yellowknives, Yellow Knives, Copper Indians, Red Knives or T'atsaot'ine (Wíílíídeh dialect: Tetsǫ́t'ınę) are Indigenous peoples of Canada, one of the five main groups of the First Nations Dene who live in the Northwest Territories. The name, which is also the source for the later community of Yellowknife, derives from the colour of the tools made from copper deposits.

== History ==
The historic Yellowknive tribe lived north and northeast of the Great Slave Lake (Tinde'e – "Great Lake") around the Yellowknife River and Yellowknife Bay (Wíílíídeh cho – "Inconnu River") and northward along the Coppermine River, northeast to the Back River (Thlewechodyeth or Thlew-ee-choh-desseth – "Great Fish River") and east to the Thelon River. They used the major rivers of their traditional land as routes for travel and trade as far east as Hudson Bay, where early European explorers such as Samuel Hearne encountered them in the 1770s.

The Yellowknives helped lead Hearne through the Canadian Arctic tundra from Hudson Bay to the Arctic Ocean in search of the legendary copper deposits that the Yellowknives, or 'Copper Indians', had a hand in mining and trading for tools. Later European explorers who encountered and traded with Copper Indians marked on their maps the 'Yellowknife River,' which drains into Great Slave Lake from headwaters originating near the headwaters of the Coppermine River, a traditional travel corridor. In the early 1800s and 1900s, the Yellowknives were the largest and most powerful tribe in the geographic area.

The Yellowknives and the Tłı̨chǫ (Dogrib), who also lived on the north shores of Great Slave Lake, were ancestral enemies. In the 1830s it was reported that the Dogrib almost wiped out the Yellowknives, the remnants of which – although opinions vary – either scattered south of Great Slave Lake or inter-married with the Dogrib. Following the discovery of gold in the Yellowknife area, a great mix of Dogrib, Chipewyan, and remnant Yellowknife members congregated and settled in the community or within the traditional villages of Dettah or Trout Rock. With government funding, the Dene village of Ndilǫ was developed in the mid 1950s on the tip of Latham Island (the northern point of Yellowknife's Old Town). The Yellowknives Dene First Nation was formed in 1991 (formerly known as Yellowknife B Band) following the collapse of a territorial-wide comprehensive land claim negotiation. They currently negotiate a land claim settlement for their lands as part of the Akaitcho Land Claim Process.

Chief Snuff of the Yellowknives signed Treaty 8 in 1899. Chief Snuff lived on the south shore and east arm of Great Slave Lake. The people who lived on the Taltson River were dubbed the Rocher River People in the 1920s. Chief Snuff had a cabin located about ten miles from Rocher River on a little piece of land beside the water, called Snuff Channel, connected to the Taltson River.

The Yellowknives continued to reside in this area until the early 1960s, when they were forced to relocate after their schoolhouse was burned down in a fire. Shortly after, the Taltson River hydro dam was built. The last chief of the Rocher River Yellowknives was Chief Pierre Frise in the 1960s; he was strongly opposed to the building of the Taltson River dam. During this point the original Yellowknives were dispersed to Fort Resolution, Yellowknife, and other areas of Canada.

== Yellowknives First Nations ==
All First Nations with Yellowknives descendants are organized in the Akaitcho Treaty 8 Tribal Corporation and in the Akaitcho Territory Government.

- Yellowknives Dene First Nation (they identify as Wíílíídeh dene, aka Inconnu River People (Yellowknife River). Communities: Dettah, Ndilǫ, and Yellowknife. Wíílíídeh, a dialect spoken in the communities of Dettah and Ndilǫ, developed from intermarriage between Yellowknives and Tłı̨chǫ peoples)
- Deninu Kųę́ First Nation (Deninu Kue (pronounced "Deneh-noo-kweh"), means "moose island"). It is a settlement corporation in the South Slave Region of the Northwest Territories. The community is situated at the mouth of the Slave River, on the shore of Great Slave Lake, Deninu K'ue or Dene Nu Kwen are/were called Chipewyan (Denesuline) and Yellowknives, which came to Fort Resolution to trade their furs.
- Łutsël K'é Dene First Nation (Lutselk'e, pronounced "Loot-sel-kay") also spelled Lutsel K'e ("place of the Lutsel", the cisco, a type of small fish), is a designated authority in the North Slave Region of the Northwest Territories. The community is located on the south shore near the eastern end of Great Slave Lake and until 1 July 1992, it was known as Snowdrift. The First Nation was formerly known as the Snowdrift Band. The most northerly Chipewyan First Nation, once nomadic caribou hunters, this band included some Chipewyan and Yellowknives who settled permanently at the trading post established in 1925 by the Hudson's Bay Company near today's Łutselk'e. In 1954 they moved to the community of Łutselk'e. Main languages in the community are Chipewyan and English.
