= Rocher River =

Coordinates: 61°23′2″N 112°44′37″W

Rocher River is an abandoned community in the South Slave Region of the Northwest Territories, Canada. The community was situated near the mouth of the Taltson River (aka Rocher River, or Roche River), which drains into Great Slave Lake. Dene trading chief Pierre Snuff built the first cabins in this area in the early 20th century, on what is called Snuff Channel, east of the later village. By 1921, the Hudson's Bay Company established a trading post at Rocher River. Independent traders followed including Northern Traders Limited (1923), Frank Morrison (1924), and Ed Demelt (1935) and the area grew into a bustling trading centre. At the time, the area was a very rich hunting and trapping area for the Dene and Metis people living on the south shore of Great Slave Lake including the Slavey, Chipeywan, and Yellowknives tribes. By the 1950s Rocher River included a government day school, two trading posts, post office, and a church, with a population of about 150. The manager of the Hudson's Bay Company post at Rocher River in the early 1940s was Ralph Jardine. On April 25, 1944, the warehouses of the HBC burned down but were immediately rebuilt.

The decline of the community occurred in several stages: In February 1960, the school was destroyed by fire and the government decided not to rebuild in favour of centralizing education services at Fort Smith, Yellowknife and Fort Resolution instead. Many families and their children moved away as a result. In 1963, the Hudson's Bay Company closed its post, and in 1964 Ed and Rose Demelt's store burned down, leading to an eventual retirement from trading business by 1968. Furthermore, the construction of the Taltson River hydro dam upstream of Rocher River in 1965 flooded many trap lines and gave further reason for the few remaining residents to move away. The population of Rocher River, according to the federal voter's list, declined from 99 in 1949, to 26 in 1968; in the 1972 voters list Rocher River was not included.

Former residents of Rocher River can be found living throughout the Northwest Territories with some still maintaining seasonal cabins at Rocher River.
