= Thaidene Nëné National Park Reserve =

National park reserve in Northwest Territories, Canada

Thaıdene Nëné National Park Reserve
- Réserve de parc national Thaıdene Nëné
- IUCN category II (national park)
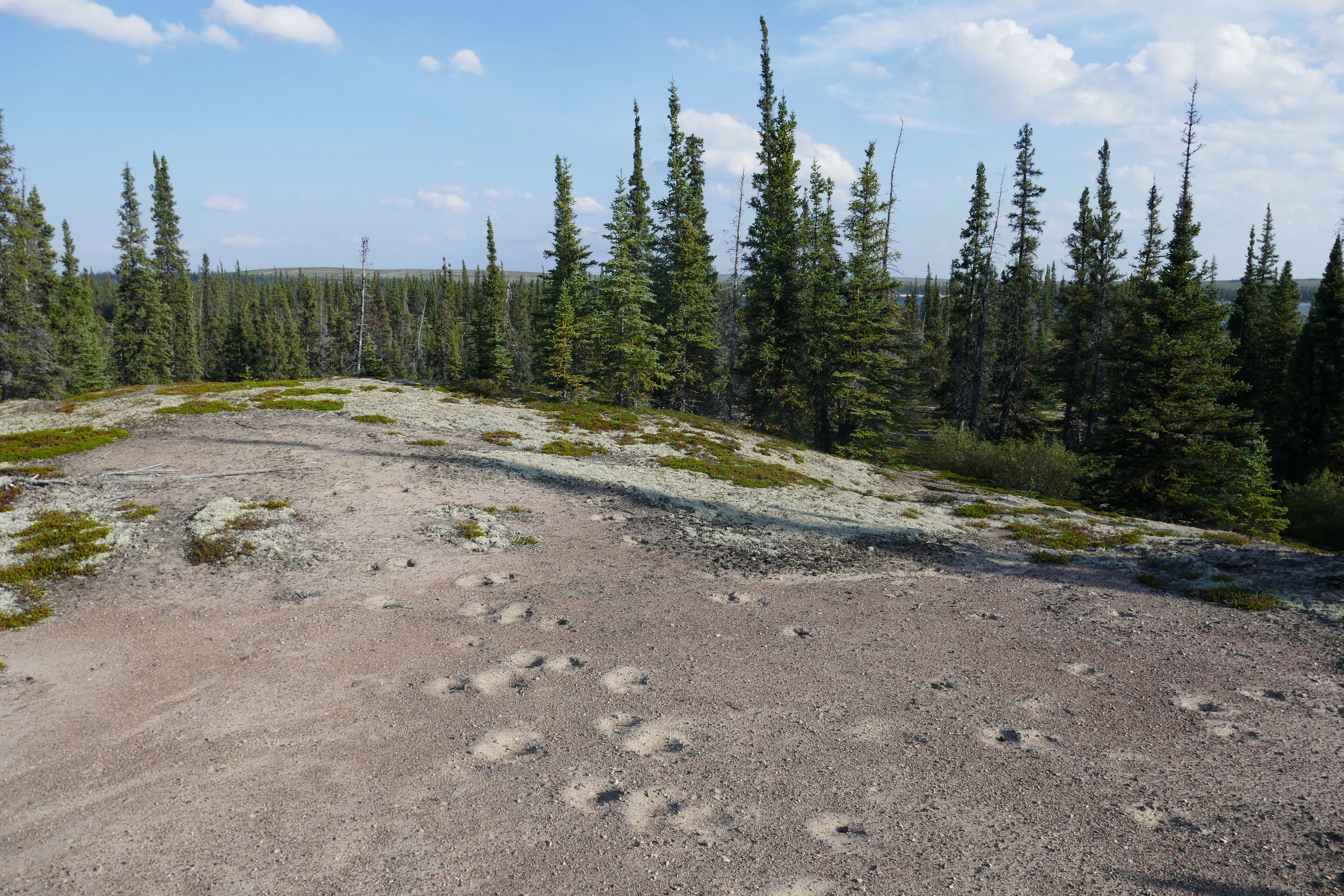
- Muskox tracks on esker

- Location within Canada Location within Northwest Territories
- Location: North Slave Region; Northwest Territories; Canada
- Nearest city: Yellowknife
- Coordinates: 62°43′N 108°38′W
- Area: 14,070 km^{2} (5,400 sq mi)
- Established: 21 August 2019
- Governing body: Parks Canada

Thaıdene Nëné National Park Reserve (from the Dene, this Chipewyan name means land of our ancestors) is a national park in the vicinity of the east arm of Great Slave Lake, located on the northern edge of the boreal forest of Canada in the North Slave Region of the Northwest Territories. It is administered by Parks Canada and is part of the Thaıdene Nëné Indigenous Protected Area, which also includes Territorial Protected Area and a Wildlife Conservation Area administered by the Government of the Northwest Territories. The National Park Reserve covers 14,070 km2 of nationally significant boreal forest, tundra, and freshwater ecosystems.

The creation of Thaıdene Nëné National Park Reserve works to protect caribou and pelt animals such as "lynx, wolf, red fox, wolverine, marten, moose and black bear". Other mammals inhabiting this park reserve include Arctic fox, beaver, muskox, grizzly bear and barren-ground caribou. The area features red granite cliffs, as well as "a spectacular array of peninsulas, canyons and waterfalls as the forests give way to northern tundra". Various migratory bird species also stage and nest in the area, including ducks and songbirds.

== History ==
Consideration for the creation a 7,340 km^{2} (2,830 sq mi) national park in the region was withdrawn in 1970 under the Territorial Lands Act, but in 2001 the Łutsël K'é Dene First Nation (previously Snowdrift) re-considered the proposal. Consultations for a feasibility study proceeded from 2002 to 2004, which drew the inclusion of the Métis Nation to the process. By 2005, the Łutselk'e produced a Band Council Resolution "supporting consideration of a national park as part of a broader protection initiative for their traditional territory", in cooperation with other Akaitcho First Nations. In 2006, the Łutselk'e Dene First Nation and the Minister of Environment and Minister Responsible for Parks Canada signed a Memorandum of Understanding which expanded the land withdrawal area for consideration for the national park by an additional 26,350 km^{2} (10,170 sq mi) and defined a process for working together on matters pertaining to establishing a national park. Originally expected to be designated in 2009, by 2014 the negotiations still had yet to be finalized.

By 2014, the government of the Northwest Territories through the Northwest Territories Devolution Act took administrative control of the 33,690 km^{2} (13,010 sq mi) park study area, and by the following year initiated a "matrix of protected area designations" that included a scaled-down National Park Reserve of 14,000 km^{2} (5,400 sq mi) in combination with a range of territorial designations, conserving 75 percent of the 33,690 km^{2} (13,010 sq mi) area. Public consultations on the smaller proposed boundaries finished in 2016. The federal government's 2016 budget named the Thaidene Nene proposal in its allocation of funds to help the National Park Reserve to realization.

On June 10, 2015, Parks Canada and the Northwest Territory Métis Nation negotiators reached an agreement in principle on most elements of an Impact and Benefit Agreement. The agreement is subject to internal review and consultation by both the NWTMN and Parks Canada.

The Government of Canada announced its proposed boundary for a national park reserve in the Thaıdene Nëné area on July 29, 2015 and launched formal consultations on the boundary.

On February 15, 2019, the Łutselk'e Dene First Nation voted to approve the creation of Thaıdene Nëné National Park Reserve. On 21 August 2019, an agreement was signed by Parks Canada, the Government of the Northwest Territories, and three First Nations (Lutsel K’e Dene First Nation, Deninu K'ue First Nation, and Yellowknives Dene First Nation) establishing a protected area consisting of a 14,305 km^{2} (5,523 sq mi) national park administered by Parks Canada, and a 12,220 km^{2} (4,720 sq mi) area administered by the territorial government that includes a wildlife conservation area.

== See also ==
- List of national parks of Canada
