= Taltson River =

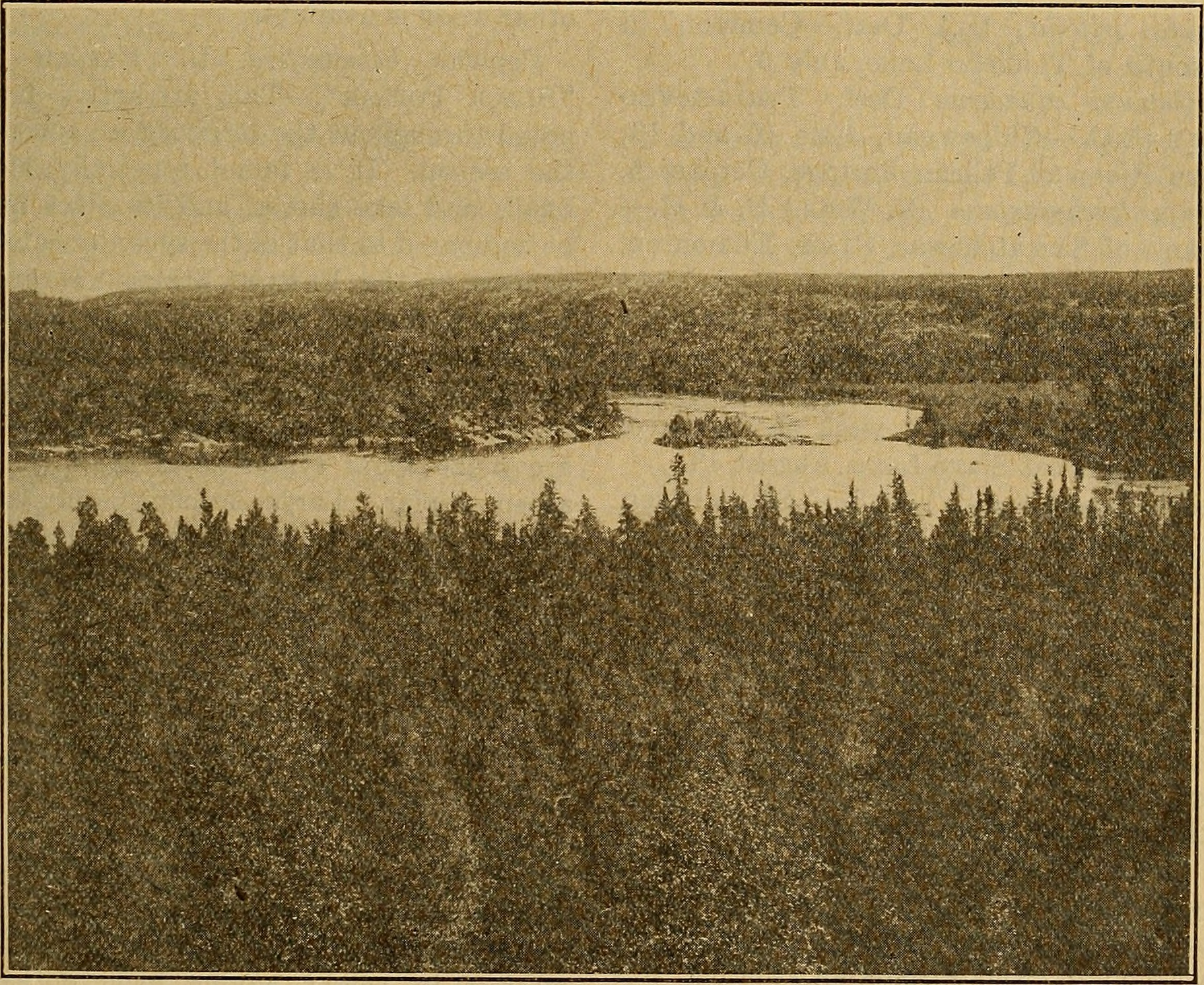
- Junction of the Tazin and Taltson Rivers, 1931

- Location within Canada

Location
- Country: Canada
- Territory: Northwest Territories

Physical characteristics
- Mouth
  - coordinates: 61°26′52″N 112°43′40″W
- Basin size: 60,000 km^{2} (23,000 sq mi)
- Discharge
  - location: Great Slave Lake

Basin features
- Tributaries
  - left: Thoa, Tazin, Tethul
  - right: Rutledge

The Taltson River is a roughly 750 km (470 mi) river in the Northwest Territories of Canada that drains into the Great Slave Lake. There are three hydroelectric power control structures on the river, and one power station.

== Name ==
The river was formerly known as the Copper Indian River in reference to the Dene known as the Yellowknives or Copper Indians. The name is derived from Tatsan which means "scum of water" and is an expression for copper. A 1918 government source says the name means "between high rocks". Other names formerly used include Copper Indian, Rocher, Rock, T'altsan and Yellow Knife.

== Basin ==
The Taltson River basin has a subhumid, high boreal ecoclimate. Summer are typically cool and winters are very cold. The basin covers about 60,000 km^{2} (23,000 sq mi) in the region between Lake Athabasca and Great Slave Lake. It contains a complex of interconnected lakes that drain first in a southwest direction and then northward into the Slave River lowland zone. The Tazin River is a major tributary. There are three hydroelectric control structures in the basin, at Nonacho Lake, Tazin Lake and Twin Gorges.

Sub-catchment areas are:

#	Sub-Catchment	km^{2}	mi^{2}
1	Upstream of Gray Lake, an arm of Nonacho Lake	11,486	4,435
2	Between Gray Lake and Nonacho Dam	10,922	4,217
3	Between Nonacho Dam and Twin Gorges Forebay	5,942	2,294
4	Tazin (Upstream Tazin Lake Outflow) (Note: The Tazin River Catchment upstream of the Tazin Lake outflow has an area of 9,875 km^{2} (3,813 sq mi), but as much as 95% is diverted south to the Charlot River. An effective catchment area of 494 km^{2} (191 sq mi) feeds the Taltson River.)	494	191
5	Tazin River downstream of Tazin Lake outflow, excluding Thoa River	5,969	2,305
6	Thoa River	10,941	4,224
7	Local inflows between Twin Gorges and Tsu Lake inflow	527	203
8	Konth River	2,180	840
9	Local Inflows to Tsu Lake	508	196
10	Rutledge River Watershed		
11	Tethul River Watershed		

== Course ==
The Taltson River rises near a series of lakes, including Coventry Lake and Dymond Lake in the northeast of the basin. It flows north to McArthur Lake, then west to Gray Lake, an arm of Nonacho Lake. Nonacho Lake is the largest lake in the river basin. It discharges to the Taltson River directly via the Nonacho Dam and indirectly via the Tronka Chua Gap, Tronka Chua Lake and Thekulthili Lake to rejoin the river at Lady Grey Lake. From Nonacho Lake to the Twin Gorges Forebay the river flows through a series of lakes, low-gradient reaches, rapids and waterfalls. Often there is just a short section of rapids between the outflow of one lake and the backwaters of the next lake. Taltson Lake, King Lake and Lady Grey Lakes are the larger lakes in this section. Below the outflow of Lady Grey Lake, about 130 km (81 mi) from Nonacho Lake, the river flows 110 km (68 mi) to the Twin Gorges Forebay, passing through several smaller lakes such as Benna Thy Lake but generally with a more standard river course. It is joined in this section by the Tazin River, its largest tributary.

There is a hydroelectric generating plant at the Twin Gorges Forebay, from where the water flows over Elsie Falls and then for 33 km (21 mi) to Tsu Lake over a series of rapids and through the Nende Chute, a narrow gorge, before entering Tsu Lake. The Konth River drains from the northeast into Tsu Lake. The average flow from 1960 to 1995, measured at a gauge at Tsu Lake Dam, was 183.63 m^{3}/s (6,485 cu ft/s). The drainage area above the dam is about 58,700 km^{2} (22,700 sq mi). Downstream of Tsu Lake the river runs north for 132 km (82 mi) to Great Slave Lake through Deskenatlata Lake. It receives the outflows of the Rutledge River and Tethul River in this stretch. Rocher River, on the east bank of the lower Taltson River, was originally a trading post of the Hudson's Bay Company. It had a school, but that was burned down in 1958, and the trading post closed in 1963. The government put pressure on the residents to move to Fort Resolution. The river enters the southern shore of Great Slave Lake at the western end of the Simpson Island chain.

== Hydroelectricity ==
A dam on Tazin Lake diverts most of the water to the Charlot River system where it drives hydroelectric facilities that feed the Saskatchewan power grid.

The Taltson dam was built in 1966 to supply power to the lead-zinc mine at Pine Point. The Taltson Hydro plant is about 64 km (40 mi) north of Fort Smith on the Taltson River at Twin Gorges Forebay. An 18 MW hydro unit with a 300 kW emergency standby diesel generator provides power via 200 km (120 mi) of transmission lines to Fort Smith, Hay River, Hay River Reserve, Fort Resolution and Enterprise. Flooding below the dam has been blamed on the power plant. However, the Northwest Territories Power Corporation (NTPC) states that the operation is similar to a run-of-river generation facility and has minimal impact on the river's natural flow. High water flows upstream of the dam will cause high flows downstream.

In 2007 the Dezé Energy Corporation presented a proposal to expand the Taltson River hydroelectric capacity with a new 36 MW hydroelectric plant at Twin Gorges Forebay to increase total capacity there to 54 MW, and to build a 690 km (430 mi) transmission line to carry power via Taltson Lake and Noncho Lake to the north of Great Slave Lake. The project would also involve construction of a new control structure and rock-cut discharge canal beside the Nonacho rock-fill dam.

== See also ==
- List of rivers of the Northwest Territories
- Taltson River Airport

== Sources ==
- Canada. Parliament (1918), Sessional Papers of the Dominion of Canada
- Hydro Electric, NTPC: Northwest Territories Power Corporation
- Isadore Simon (18 March 2014), "Isadore Simon recalls Rocher River before Taltson Dam", CBC News
- Mike Gibbins (28 April 2017), N.W.T. Power Corp. responsible for flooding below Taltson dam, MLA says, CBC News
- NWT Place Names Database, Prince of Wales Northern Heritage Centre, archived from the original on 2022-08-14
- "Project Description Overview" (PDF), Yellowknife Scoping Sessions, Mackenzie Valley Environmental Impact Review Board, 2007-12-07
- Taltson Hydroelectric Expansion Project (PDF), Dezé energy, 2009
- Taltson River at Outlet of Tsu Lake, R-ArcticNET, 1960–1995
