= McArthur Lake (Northwest Territories) =

Lake in the Northwest Territories, Canada

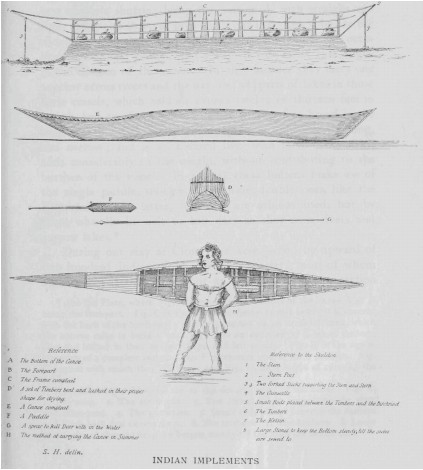
- Illustration of canoe building at Lake Clowey (McArthur Lake), from Samuel Hearne's 1795 A Journey From Prince of Wales’s Fort in Hudson’s Bay to the Northern Ocean

- Location in Canada
- Location: Northwest Territories, Canada
- Coordinates: 61.567361°N 106.793764°W
- Basin countries: Canada

McArthur Lake, formerly Clowey Lake, is a lake in the Northwest Territories, Canada. It is on the Taltson River to the east of Great Slave Lake, and is just south of the tree line. In the past it may have been a center for canoe building.

== Geography ==
McArthur Lake is about 250 kilometres (160 mi) north of Lake Athabasca and about 200 kilometres (120 mi) east of Great Slave Lake. The lake is about 12 miles (19 km) long from east to west. The southern extension of the lake connects to Burpee Lake. It lies just to the south of the tree line. Annual average temperature is −8 °C (18 °F). The warmest month is July, when the average temperature is 16 °C (61 °F), and the coldest is December with −25 °C (−13 °F). Campsites in the area typically have small groves of spruce and birch, and there are some jack pines. The lake is shallow, so a strong wind can whip up steep waves. Below the lake there is a series of complex rapids.

== History ==
McArthur Lake seems to be the lake that the explorer Samuel Hearne named "Clowey Lake". The lake is within Chipewyan territory. Hearne left Prince of Wales Fort on Hudson Bay on 7 December 1770 with a party of Chipewyan people, aiming to reach the Arctic Ocean by summer. He described Dene canoe building at Lake Clowey. Based on Hearne's account, it seems possible that Slavey and Dogrib Dene people habitually gathered at the lake to build canoes. It was given its present name on 6 June 1957 in honour of Warrant Officer Edwin Matthew McArthur, 405 Squadron of the Royal Canadian Air Force, who died in action during World War II on 1 September 1943.

== River basin ==
The Taltson River basin has a subhumid, high boreal ecoclimate. Summers are typically cool and winters are very cold. It covers about 11,486 square kilometres (4,435 sq mi) upstream from Gray Lake, an arm of Nonacho Lake. The river rises near a series of lakes, including Coventry Lake and Dymond Lake in the northeast of the basin. It flows north to McArthur Lake, then west to Gray Lake. From there it flows to the southern shore of Great Slave Lake at the western end of the Simpson Island chain.

== Geology ==
The McCann–McArthur Lake region is in the southwestern Rae Craton. The lake lies in the McCann domain just southeast of the northeast-trending Penylan domain.

== Fish ==
A 2014 analysis of mercury in twenty specimens of lake trout found that 75% were over the commercial guideline and 100% over the frequent consumption guideline. Analysis of four specimens of lake whitefish found that all were within the guidelines.

== Sources ==
- A Place of Honour: War Casualties Commemorated in NWT Place Names, Prince of Wales Northern Heritage Centre
- Berman, R.G.; Pehrsson, Sally; Davis, W.J.; Ryan, J.J.; Qui, H; Ashton, K.E.. (2013), "Arrowsmith orogeny: Geochronological and thermobarometric constraints on its extent and tectonic setting in the Rae craton, with implications for pre-Nuna supercontinent reconstruction", Precambrian Research, 232 (232): 44, Bibcode:2013PreR..232...44B, doi:10.1016/j.precamres.2012.10.015
- "Dataset Index", NEO: NASA Earth Observations, NASA, archived from the original on 2021-10-26
- Fuller, W. A. (September 1999), "Samuel Hearne's Track: Some Obscurities Clarified", Arctic, 52 (3), Arctic Institute of North America: 257–271, doi:10.14430/arctic931, JSTOR 40511778
- Goldner, Jonathan (October 2016), Teaching the Whole Body: Apprenticeships in Gwich'in Canoe Building (PDF) (Thesis)
- MLT Aikins LLP (9 June 2017), Responses to Undertaking l (PDF), Edmonton, Alberta
- Morse, Eric W. (1987), Freshwater Saga: Memoirs of a Lifetime of Wilderness Canoeing in Canada, University of Toronto Press, ISBN 978-0-8020-6657-2
- Percival, John; Martel, Edith; Pehrsson, Sally; Acosta-Góngora, Pedro; Regis, Daniele; Thiessen, Eric; Jamison, D; Neil, B; Knox, Bernadette (2016), Report of 2016 Bedrock Activities for the Geologic and Metallogenic Framework of the South Rae Craton, Southeast NWT: GEM 2 South Rae Quaternary and Bedrock Project, doi:10.4095/299469
- Taltson Hydroelectric Expansion Project (PDF), Dezé energy, 2009
