= Snare River =

River in the Northwest Territories, Canada

Coordinates: 63°07′N 115°53′W

The Snare River is a river in the Northwest Territories, Canada.

It is connected to Great Slave Lake via Marian Lake and Frank Channel and hosts the Snare Hydro System, four hydroelectric plants about 140 km (87 mi) northwest of Yellowknife which it powers along with the nearby communities of Behchokǫ̀ and Dettah. It is located close to the Snare River Airport, owned by the Northwest Territories Power Corporation, which serves the hydro system.
