= Ice Lake =

Ice Lake may refer to:

== Places ==
=== Canada ===
- Ice Lake, Ontario, a community in Ontario.
- Ice Lake (Herbert Township, Thunder Bay District), Ontario
- Ice Lake (GTP Block 2 Township, Thunder Bay District), Ontario
- Ice Lake (Manitoulin District), Ontario
- Ice Lake (Algoma District), Ontario

=== New Zealand ===
- Ice Lake, New Zealand, in the list of lakes of New Zealand

=== United States ===
- Ice Lake (Oregon)
- Ice Lake, in the Ice Lake Basin of Silverton, Colorado
- Ice Lake, Alpine Lakes Wilderness, in the list of lakes in the Alpine Lakes Wilderness, Washington state

== Other uses ==
- Ice Lake (microprocessor), code name for Intel's 10th-generation Core microprocessor architecture
- Ice Lake, a novel by Trevor Ferguson

== See also ==
- Lake ice, ice on lakes
  - Lake ice, in the cryosphere
- Baltic Ice Lake, retreated at the end of the Pleistocene
- Wenham Lake Ice Company, harvested and exported ice from Wenham Lake in Wenham, Massachusetts, US
- Ice Lake Rebels, an American documentary television series
- Glacial lake, a body of water with origins from glacier activity
- Glacial Lake Wisconsin, a prehistoric proglacial lake in the US
