= Rhodes Wellness College =

Canadian private post-secondary institution

Coordinates: 49.2654°N 123.1074°W

- Type: Private post-secondary institution
- Established: 1996
- Founder: Bea Rhodes
- President: Brian Parker
- Location: 116 West 6th Avenue, Vancouver, BC, Vancouver, British Columbia, Canada
- Website: rhodescollege.ca

Rhodes Wellness College is a private post-secondary institution in Vancouver, British Columbia, Canada. Founded in 1996, it offers diploma and certificate programs in fields including counselling, coaching, massage therapy, nutrition, and end-of-life care. The college is regulated by the Private Training Institutions Regulatory Unit (PTIRU) of the British Columbia Ministry of Post-Secondary Education and Future Skills and holds Education Quality Assurance (EQA) designation from the province.

== History ==
Rhodes Wellness College was founded in 1996 by Bea Rhodes, originally operating as Rhodes and Associates. In 2019 the college was acquired by Benjamin Colling and Paul Leong, with Colling becoming president and Rhodes appointed as senior education advisor.

In 2020 the college moved its full-time programs to online delivery during the COVID-19 pandemic, launched the Northern Indigenous Counselling program, and acquired the Vancouver School of Healing Arts. In 2026 it relocated to a campus at 116 West 6th Avenue in the Mount Pleasant neighbourhood of Vancouver.

== Academic programs ==
Rhodes Wellness College offers full-time diploma and certificate programs in both blended in-person/online and fully online formats. Programs include the Professional Counselling Diploma, Wellness Counsellor Diploma, Life Skills Counselling Certificate, Life Coach Certificate, Registered Massage Therapy Diploma, Professional Integrative Nutrition Counsellor Diploma, Professional Animal-Assisted Wellness Therapy Diploma, and End-of-Life Doula Certificate.

== Accreditation and professional recognition ==
The college is regulated by the Private Training Institutions Regulatory Unit (PTIRU) of the British Columbia Ministry of Post-Secondary Education and Future Skills and holds Education Quality Assurance (EQA) designation from the Province of British Columbia. It is recognized by the Canadian Professional Counsellors Association (CPCA) and the Association of Cooperative Counselling Therapists (ACCT) as an associate school, and by the International Coaching Federation as a Level 1 approved education provider.

== Northern Indigenous Counselling program ==
The Northern Indigenous Counselling (NIC) program is a partnership between Rhodes Wellness College and Dene Wellness Warriors, a counselling organization founded in Yellowknife in 2014 by Jean and Roy Erasmus, who are both graduates of the college's Professional Counselling Diploma program. The program was developed after Jean Erasmus, attending a 2019 training session, observed that she was the only Indigenous counsellor among the 54 counsellors then working with Indian residential school survivors across the three northern territories; she and Roy Erasmus subsequently approached the college about adapting its Professional Counselling Diploma for delivery in the Northwest Territories. Students were funded through the Government of the Northwest Territories Student Financial Assistance program, and the program is listed as a supported project of Hotii ts'eeda, the NWT SPOR Support Unit. The curriculum draws on Western counselling approaches while adapting course content to be culturally relevant for Indigenous students.

The first cohort began in September 2020 with 18 students from 11 communities across the Northwest Territories. Fifteen students graduated in May 2022 at a ceremony at the Northwest Territories Legislative Assembly; the graduation was acknowledged by Premier Caroline Cochrane and reported by outlets including CBC News and the Aboriginal Peoples Television Network. A second cohort began in September 2023 and graduated 12 students in July 2025. The second cohort was supported by organizations including the Government of the Northwest Territories, the Inuvialuit Regional Corporation, the Dene Nation, and the Yellowknives Dene First Nation. The program has been described as the first of its kind in the Northwest Territories.
