= Michel Sikyea =

Canadian politician (1901–2002)

Michel Sikyea (June 5, 1901 – December 21, 2002) was a Dene elder and indigenous rights activist from the Yellowknife, Northwest Territories.

== Biography ==
He was on born June 5, 1901, to Sekiye and Noemie Tsatsittchele; he was orphaned when he was three. From there, Sikyea grew up in the mission in Fort Resolution until he was 18; in 1923, he married Rose Benaya (Wennaya). While he spent most of his life living on the land traditionally: trapping, hunting and fishing at Moose Bay, southeast of Yellowknife, he also worked part-time for 16 years at Con Mine and for seven years at Giant Mine.

In 1963, he moved to Ndilǫ, where he and his wife lived until they moved to Aven Manor, a senior citizens facility in Yellowknife in 1995. During his time in Ndilǫ, Sikyea was both a councillor and a council advisor; he also was a signatory on Treaty 11, and raised awareness about indigenous rights by teaching others about the treaty.

=== The "Million Dollar Duck" ===
In the late 1960s, Sikyea shot a female mallard duck out of season, and was subsequently charged with poaching. After a trial, Sikyea was fined $1, while the government had to pay over $1 million in court costs. The trial brought attention to the causes of indigenous and treaty rights.

=== Death and legacy ===
He died December 21, 2002, at the age of 102.

The Ndilǫ First Nations community named a road after Sikyea to recognize his contributions to indigenous civil rights.
