= Łutsël K'é Dene First Nation =

First Nations band government in the Northwest Territories, Canada

- Band No. 764
- Flag of the Łutsël K'é Dene
- People: Chipewyan
- Treaty: Treaty 8
- Headquarters: Łutselk'e
- Territory: Northwest Territories

Population (2021)
- On reserve: 16
- On other land: 522
- Off reserve: 279
- Total population: 817

Government
- Chief: James Marlowe

Tribal Council
- Akaitcho Territory Government

Website
- facebook.com/lutselke

The Łutsël K'é Dene First Nation is a First Nations band government in the Northwest Territories. The band is headquartered in the community of Łutselk'e, formerly Snowdrift, on the East Arm of Great Slave Lake.

LDFN was instrumental in the creation of Thaidene Nëné National Park Reserve, which was established in 2019 under co-management with Parks Canada.
