= Steve Norn =

Canadian politician

Member of the Legislative Assembly of the Northwest Territories
- In office October 1, 2019 – November 23, 2021
- Preceded by: Tom Beaulieu
- Succeeded by: Richard Edjericon
- Constituency: Tu Nedhé-Wiilideh

Personal details
- Party: non-partisan consensus government

Steve Norn is a Canadian politician, who was elected to the Legislative Assembly of the Northwest Territories in the 2019 election. He represented the electoral district of Tu Nedhé-Wiilideh.

Prior to his election to the legislature, Norn worked as a Royal Canadian Mounted Police officer and as an insurance broker, and competed on Canada's Smartest Person in 2016.

== COVID-19 controversy ==
On April 22, 2021, Norn revealed publicly that he tested positive for COVID-19 a day earlier, saying he chose to reveal his infection because of his public role. Norn had returned from a visit to Alberta on April 4, and was required to self-isolate for 14 days under the territory's COVID-19 protocols, however it was determined that Norn entered the Legislative Assembly on April 17, one day earlier than the self-isolation period expired. On May 4, MLAs filed a complaint with the territory's integrity commissioner, and several chiefs of the Yellowknives Dene First Nation released a statement calling for Norn's removal from the Legislature. On June 7, Norn was charged with two violations of the territory's Public Health Act.

A seven-day public inquiry in October revealed that Norn breached his self-isolation five times within the mandatory 14-day period, and determined that he purposely misled the public and broke the Legislative Assembly code of conduct on multiple occasions. The inquiry's adjudicator, Justice Ronald Barkley, described Norn repeatedly attempting to delay the inquiry or refusing to cooperate, culminating in Norn failing to appear on its first day. Barkley recommended that Norn's seat be declared vacant. Norn ignored the report and recommendations, but MLA Frieda Martselos requested a vote on his expulsion as soon as the Legislative Assembly returned for the last session of the year. Upon reconvening, the Legislature unanimously voted to expel Norn. Norn was not present for this vote; he attempted to resign just minutes prior to the vote taking place, but this was rejected by the Speaker. This was the first time in Northwest Territories history that members of the legislature removed a colleague.

Norn attempted to regain his Legislature seat in a by-election on February 8, 2022, but placed third behind Richard Edjericon.

On March 2, 2022, Norn pled guilty to one violation of the Public Health Act in a plea bargain, and was fined CA$1,380.
