= Tu Nedhé-Wiilideh =

Territorial electoral district in the Northwest Territories, Canada

Northwest Territories electoral district
- Boundaries of Tu Nedhé-Wiilideh

Territorial electoral district
- Legislature: Legislative Assembly of the Northwest Territories
MLA
Richard Edjericon
- First contested: 2015
- Last contested: 2023
- Region: North Slave Region, South Slave Region
- Communities: Dettah, Fort Resolution, Lutselk'e, N'Dilo

Tu Nedhé-Wiilideh is a territorial electoral district in the Northwest Territories, Canada, which elects one member to the Legislative Assembly of the Northwest Territories. The district consists of the communities of N'Dilo, Lutselk'e, Fort Resolution and Dettah. It had an estimated population of 1,412 in 2012.

The district was created in 2013 when the ridings of Tu Nedhe and Weledeh were merged. It was first contested in the 2015 Northwest Territories general election.

== Members of the Legislative Assembly (MLAs) ==
Name	Elected	Left Office
Tom Beaulieu	2015	2019
Steve Norn	2019	2021
Richard Edjericon	2022	present

Steve Norn was elected in the 2019 territorial election, but in late 2021 became the first MLA to be removed from the Legislature by his colleagues. This event was a consequence of Norn's refusal to follow COVID-19 protocols, and subsequent actions on his part against his colleagues during the ensuing investigation. He had attempted to resign prior to this vote, but the Speaker rejected it. The seat remained vacant until by-election took place the following year. Norn ran in the by-election but was defeated by Richard Edjericon.

== Election results ==
=== 2023 election ===
2023 Northwest Territories general election
Candidate	Votes	%
Richard Edjericon (I)	221	87.01
Nadine Delorme	33	12.99
Total votes	254	

=== 2022 by-election ===
Northwest Territories territorial by-election, 2022 Expulsion of Steve Norn
Candidate	Votes
Richard Edjericon	186
Mary Rose Sundberg	99
Steve Norn	70
Ernest Betsina	62
Nadine Delorme	12
Clinton Unka	10
Total valid votes	439

=== 2019 election ===
2019 Northwest Territories general election
Candidate	Votes	%
Steve Norn	206	36
Richard Edjericon	128	23
Lila Fraser Erasmus	115	21
Paul Betsina	102	18
Nadine Delorme	8	1
Total valid votes / Turnout	557	68.51

=== 2015 election ===
2015 Northwest Territories general election
Candidate	Votes	%
Tom Beaulieu	410	69.85
Richard Edjericon	177	30.15
Total valid votes	587	
Eligible voters / Turnout	822	71.41

== See also ==
- List of Northwest Territories territorial electoral districts
- Canadian provincial electoral districts
