= Łutselk'e =

Łutselkʼe Łutsël Kʼé; Snowdrift (pre-1992)
- First Nation - Designated Authority of Łutselkʼe
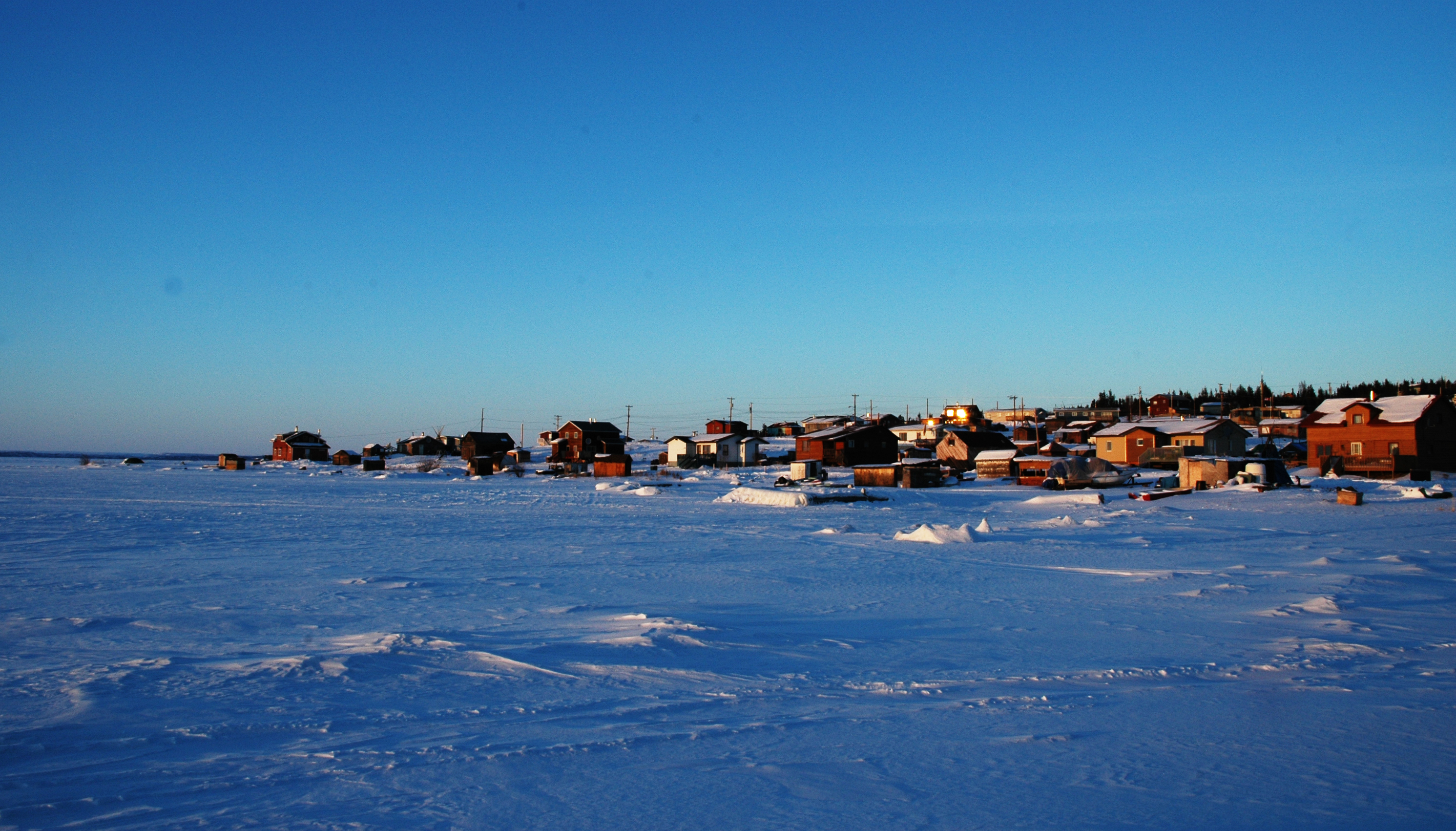
- Łutselkʼe on Great Slave Lake

- Location within Northwest Territories Location within Canada
- Coordinates: 62°24′19″N 110°44′19″W
- Country: Canada
- Territory: Northwest Territories
- Region: North Slave
- Territorial electoral district: Tu Nedhé-Wiilideh
- Census division: Region 5

Government
  - Chief: James Marlowe
  - Senior Administrative Officer: Hanna Catholique
  - MLA: Richard Edjericon

Area
  - Land: 43.18 km^{2} (16.67 sq mi)
- Elevation: 168 m (551 ft)

Population (2016)
  - Total: 303
  - Density: 7/km^{2} (18/sq mi)
- Time zone: UTC−7 (MST)
  - Summer (DST): UTC−6 (MDT)
- Canadian Postal code: X
- Area code: 867
- Telephone exchange: 370
- Living cost: 167.5^{A}
- Food price index: 184.0^{B}
- Sources: Department of Municipal and Community Affairs, Prince of Wales Northern Heritage Centre, Canada Flight Supplement^A2013 figure based on Edmonton = 100^B2012 figure based on Yellowknife = 100

Łutselkʼe (/ˈlʊtsəlkeɪ/, Dëne Sųłıné Yatıé: [ɬutsʰɛɮk'ɛ]; "place of the łutsel", the cisco, a type of small fish), also spelt Łutsël Kʼé, is a "designated authority" in the North Slave Region of the Northwest Territories, Canada. The community is on the south shore near the eastern end of Great Slave Lake and until 1 July 1992, it was known as Snowdrift, as the community lies near the mouth of the Snowdrift River.

== History ==
Łutselkʼe is a First Nation community and the area was traditionally occupied by the Chipewyan Dene In 1925 the Hudson's Bay Company opened a post followed by the Roman Catholic Church. A school opened in 1960. There is a proposal ongoing for Thaidene Nene National Park Reserve, with an area of 14,000 km^{2} (5,400 sq mi), which has the support of the community.

== Demographics ==
Federal census population history of Lutselk'e
Year	Pop.	±%
1976	224	—
1981	253	+12.9%
1986	273	+7.9%
1991	286	+4.8%
1996	304	+6.3%
2001	322	+5.9%
2006	318	−1.2%
2011	295	−7.2%
2016	303	+2.7%
2021	333	+9.9%
Source: Statistics Canada

Annual population estimates

Year	Pop.	±%
1996	326	—
1997	327	+0.3%
1998	335	+2.4%
1999	352	+5.1%
2000	355	+0.9%
2001	359	+1.1%
2002	391	+8.9%
2003	399	+2.0%
2004	392	−1.8%
2005	357	−8.9%
2006	333	−6.7%

Year	Pop.	±%
2007	330	−0.9%
2008	328	−0.6%
2009	316	−3.7%
2010	310	−1.9%
2011	306	−1.3%
2012	312	+2.0%
2013	307	−1.6%
2014	314	+2.3%
2015	308	−1.9%
2016	316	+2.6%
2017	330	+4.4%

Sources: NWT Bureau of Statistics (2001 - 2017)

In the 2021 Census of Population conducted by Statistics Canada, Lutselk'e had a population of 333 living in 129 of its 139 total private dwellings, a change of 9.9% from its 2016 population of 303. With a land area of 42.96 km^{2} (16.59 sq mi), it had a population density of 7.8/km^{2} (20.1/sq mi) in 2021.

In the 2016 Census the majority of the population, 270 people, were First Nations, 10 people were Métis and 10 were Inuit. The main languages in the community are Denesuline and English.

In 2016, 115 people said they spoke an Indigenous languages as their mother tongue. Of these 115 people, 105 spoke Dene (Chipewyan or Denesuline), 5 spoke Dogrib or Tłı̨chǫ and 5 spoke North Slavey or Hare. Another 5 people gave a Chinese language as their mother tongue. A total of 295 knew English and another 5 knew both English and French.

== Services ==
There is a two-person Royal Canadian Mounted Police detachment and health centre with two nurses in the community. There is a single grocery store, the Lutselk'e Co-op, a post office and nine lodges / outfitters in the area. Education in the community is provided by the Lutsel Kʼe Dene School, which offers a comprehensive K-12 program. Additionally, there is also a community learning centre run by Aurora College.

Although not accessible by road there is an airport, Lutselk'e Airport, with scheduled services from Yellowknife and an annual sealift is provided by the territorial government's ships from Hay River in the summer. Lutselk'e Water Aerodrome is available in the summer months when the lake is clear of ice.

== First Nations ==
Łutsel Kʼe is represented by the Łutsël K'é Dene First Nation and are part of the Akaitcho Territory Government.
