= Deninu Kųę́ First Nation =

Band government in Canada

Deninu Kųę́ First Nation Band No. 762
- People: Dene
- Treaty: Treaty 8
- Headquarters: Fort Resolution
- Territory: Northwest Territories

Population (2019)
- On other land: 463
- Off reserve: 497
- Total population: 960

Government
- Chief: Louis Balsillie

Tribal Council
- Akaitcho Territory Government

Website
- facebook.com/DeninuKueFirstNation

The Deninu Kųę́ First Nation is a Dene First Nations band government in the Northwest Territories. The band is headquartered in the community of Fort Resolution.

The Deninu Kųę́ First Nation belongs to the Akaitcho Territory Government and are signatories to Treaty 8.

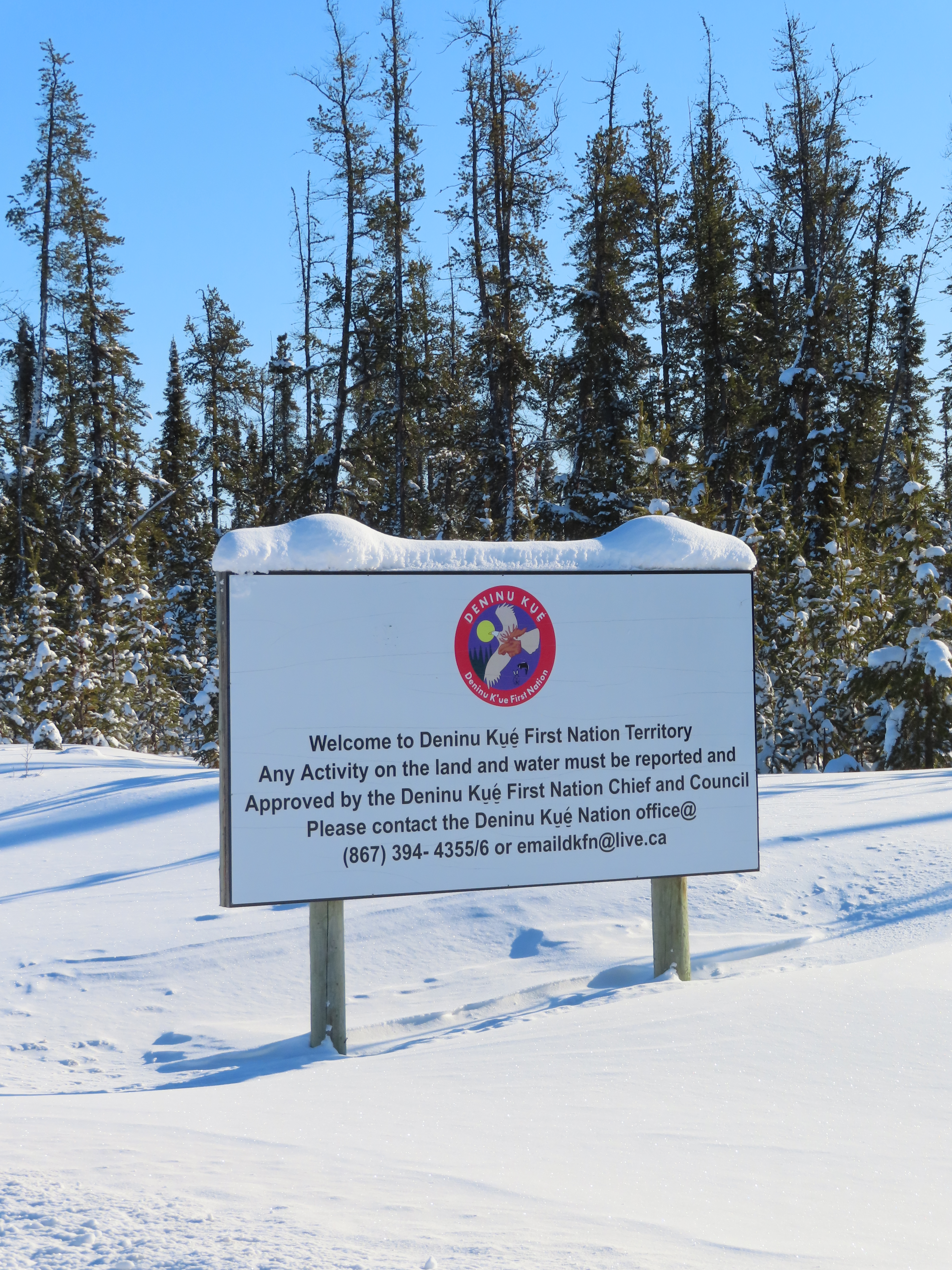
Sign marking traditional Deninu Kųę́ territory along Highway 5
