= Ice Lake Rebels =

- Country of origin: United States
- Original language: English
- No. of seasons: 2

Production
- Producers: Kathryn Haydn-Hays, Melinda Toporoff
- Camera setup: Multiple

Original release
- Network: Animal Planet
- Release: July 29, 2014 – present

Ice Lake Rebels is an American reality TV show about houseboat dwellers in Great Slave Lake.

It aired on Animal Planet for two seasons, from 2014 to 2016. The show was produced by Critical Content of Los Angeles, and aired on Animal Planet. The producer was Kathryn Haydn Hays.

Critics from The New York Times and the Boston Herald mainly commented on the difficult conditions depicted in the show, praising the characters' determination but not much else.
