= Dettah =

Dettah Tʼèɂehdaà
- Yellowknives Dene First Nation (Dettah)
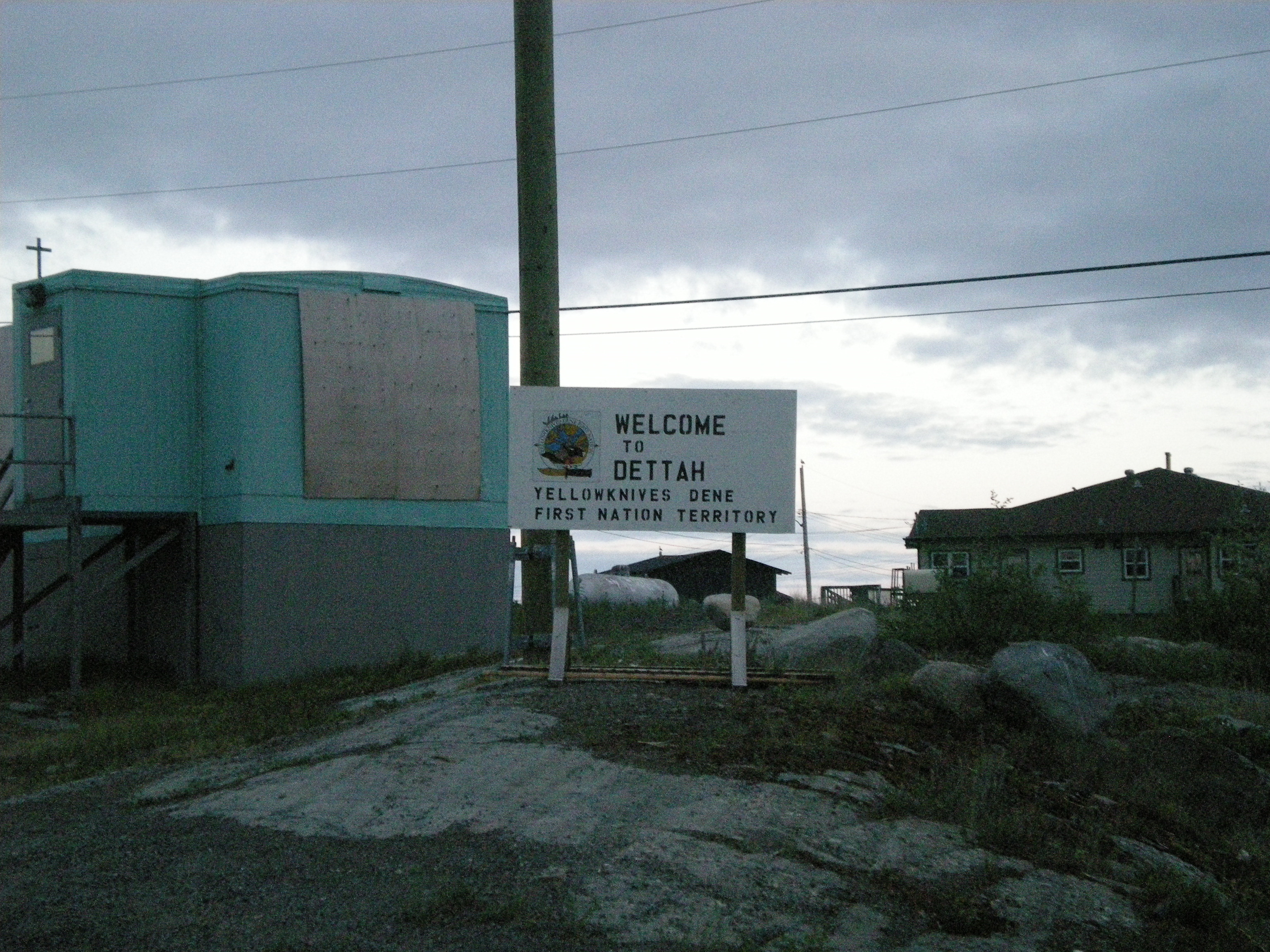

- Location within Northwest Territories Location within Canada
- Coordinates: 62°24′40″N 114°18′30″W
- Country: Canada
- Territory: Northwest Territories
- Region: North Slave Region
- Territorial electoral district: Tu Nedhé-Wiilideh
- Census division: Region 6

Government
  - Chief: Ernest Betsina
  - Councillors: Anastassia Judas, Peter Crookedhand, Mary Rose Sundberg, Rosanna Sangris, & Liza Charlo-Pieper
  - MLA: Richard Edjericon

Area
  - Land: 1.12 km^{2} (0.43 sq mi)
- Elevation: 179 m (587 ft)

Population (2021)
  - Total: 192
  - Density: 171.9/km^{2} (445/sq mi)
- Time zone: UTC−07:00 (MST)
  - Summer (DST): UTC−06:00 (MDT)
- Canadian Postal code: X1A
- Area code: 867
- Telephone exchanges: 444 445 446 669 765 766 873 920
- Sources: Department of Municipal and Community Affairs, Prince of Wales Northern Heritage Centre, Canada Flight Supplement

Dettah /dɛˈtɑː/, sometimes spelled incorrectly as Detah, is a First Nations community in the North Slave Region of the Northwest Territories, Canada. Located just southeast of the capital of Yellowknife, it is a 6.5 km (4.0 mi) drive from that city by ice road across the north arm of Great Slave Lake in winter or a 27 km (17 mi) drive via the Ingraham Trail, year-round. The name T'é?ehdaá means 'Burnt Point' in the Wíílíídeh dialect and was simplified to Dettah when non-Indigenous people could not pronounce it. The place was a common fishing spot for the Tetsǫ́tʼine (Yellowknives) people and is home to nearly 200 Indigenous people.

== Demographics ==
In the 2021 Canadian census conducted by Statistics Canada, Dettah recorded a population of 192 living in 79 of its 85 total private dwellings, a change of −12.3% from its 2016 population of 219. With a land area of 1.12 km^{2} (0.43 sq mi), it had a population density of 171.4/km^{2} in 2021.

Both it and Ndilǫ are the communities of the Yellowknives. Dettah is represented by the Yellowknives Dene First Nation (Dettah) and are part of the Akaitcho Territory Government.

Federal census population history of Detah
Year	Pop.	±%
1976	126	—
1981	143	+13.5%
1986	131	−8.4%
1991	150	+14.5%
1996	190	+26.7%
2001	234	+23.2%
2006	247	+5.6%
2011	210	−15.0%
2016	219	+4.3%
2021	192	−12.3%
Source: Statistics Canada

Annual population estimates

Year	Pop.	±%
2001	214	—
2002	219	+2.3%
2003	214	−2.3%
2004	230	+7.5%
2005	235	+2.2%
2006	254	+8.1%
2007	250	−1.6%
2008	245	−2.0%
2009	222	−9.4%
2010	221	−0.5%

Year	Pop.	±%
2011	216	−2.3%
2012	217	+0.5%
2013	226	+4.1%
2014	234	+3.5%
2015	244	+4.3%
2016	247	+1.2%
2017	245	−0.8%
2018	235	−4.1%
2019	234	−0.4%

Sources: NWT Bureau of Statistics (2008 - 2019), NWT Bureau of Statistics (2001 - 2017)

== Gallery ==
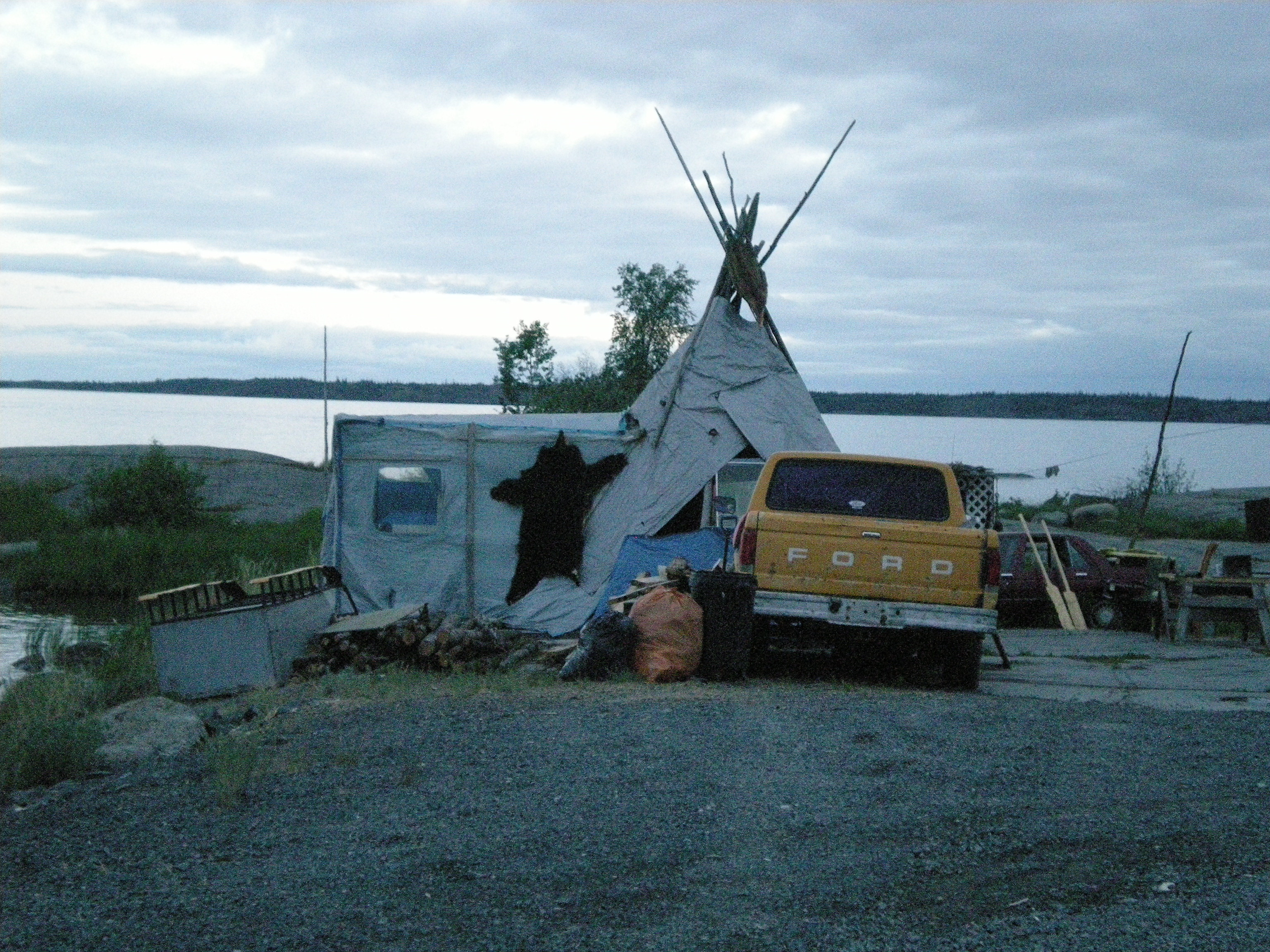
Bear skin drying

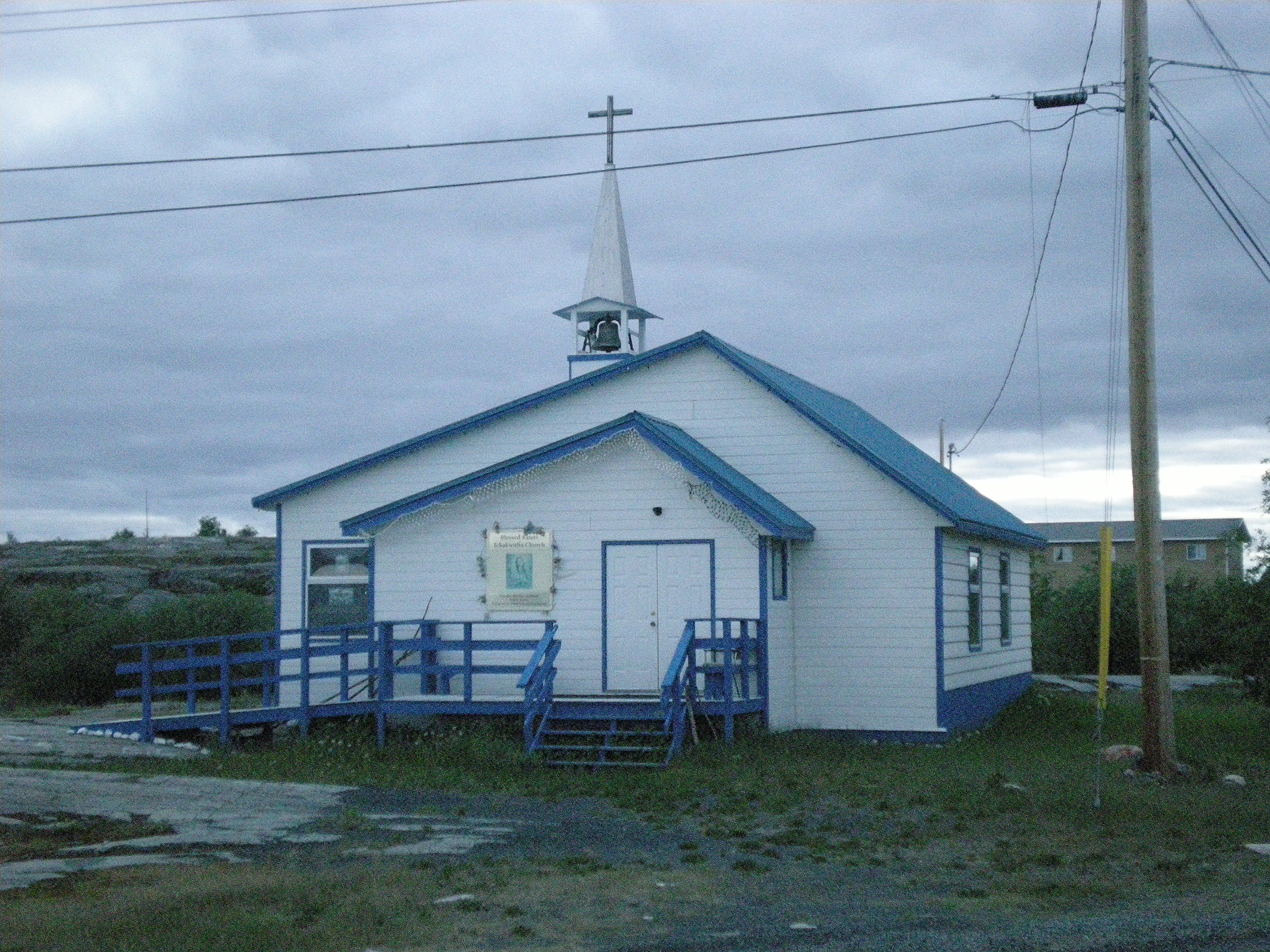
Kateri Tekakwitha church

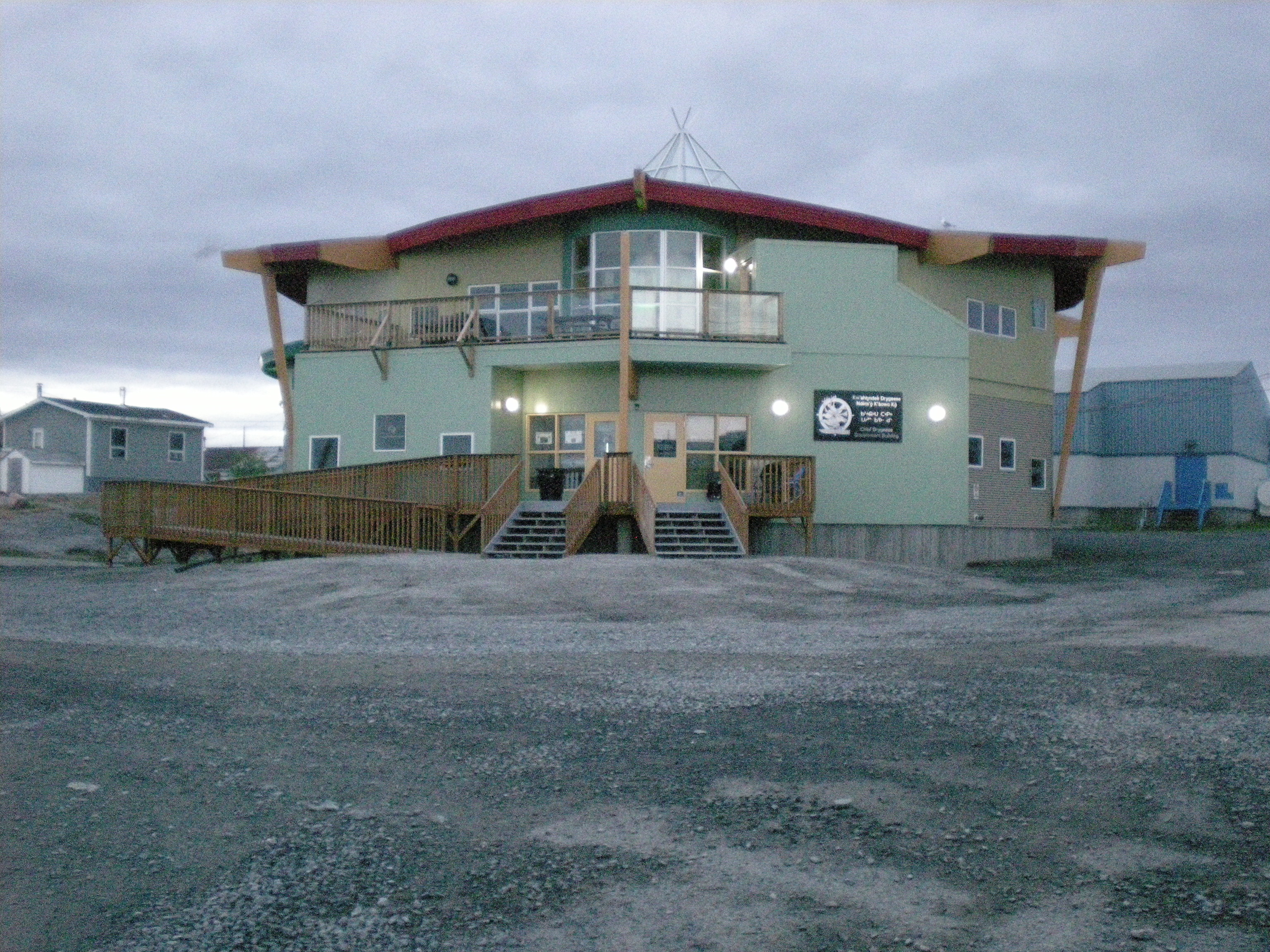
First Nation Band Office

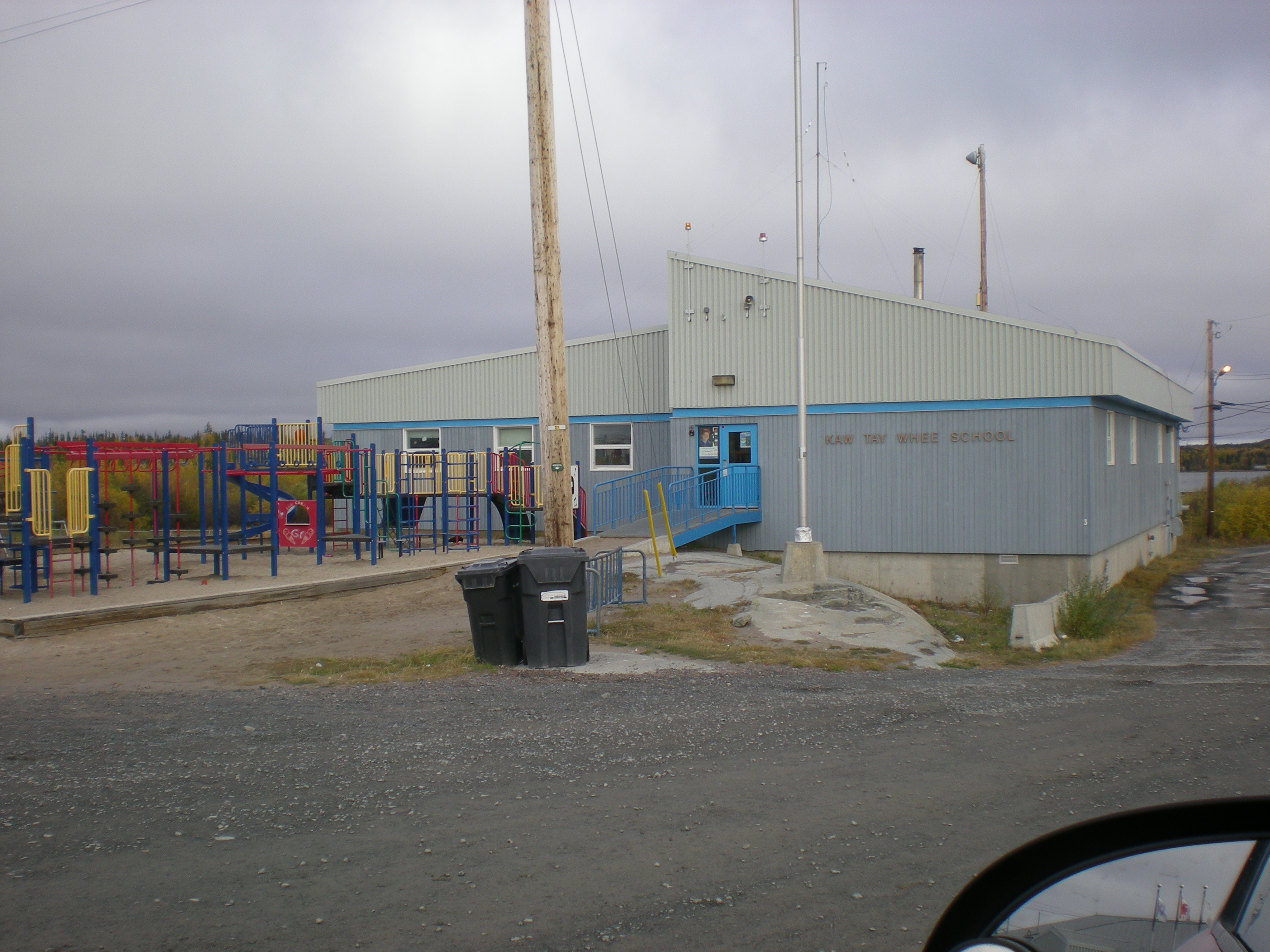
Kaw Tay Whee School

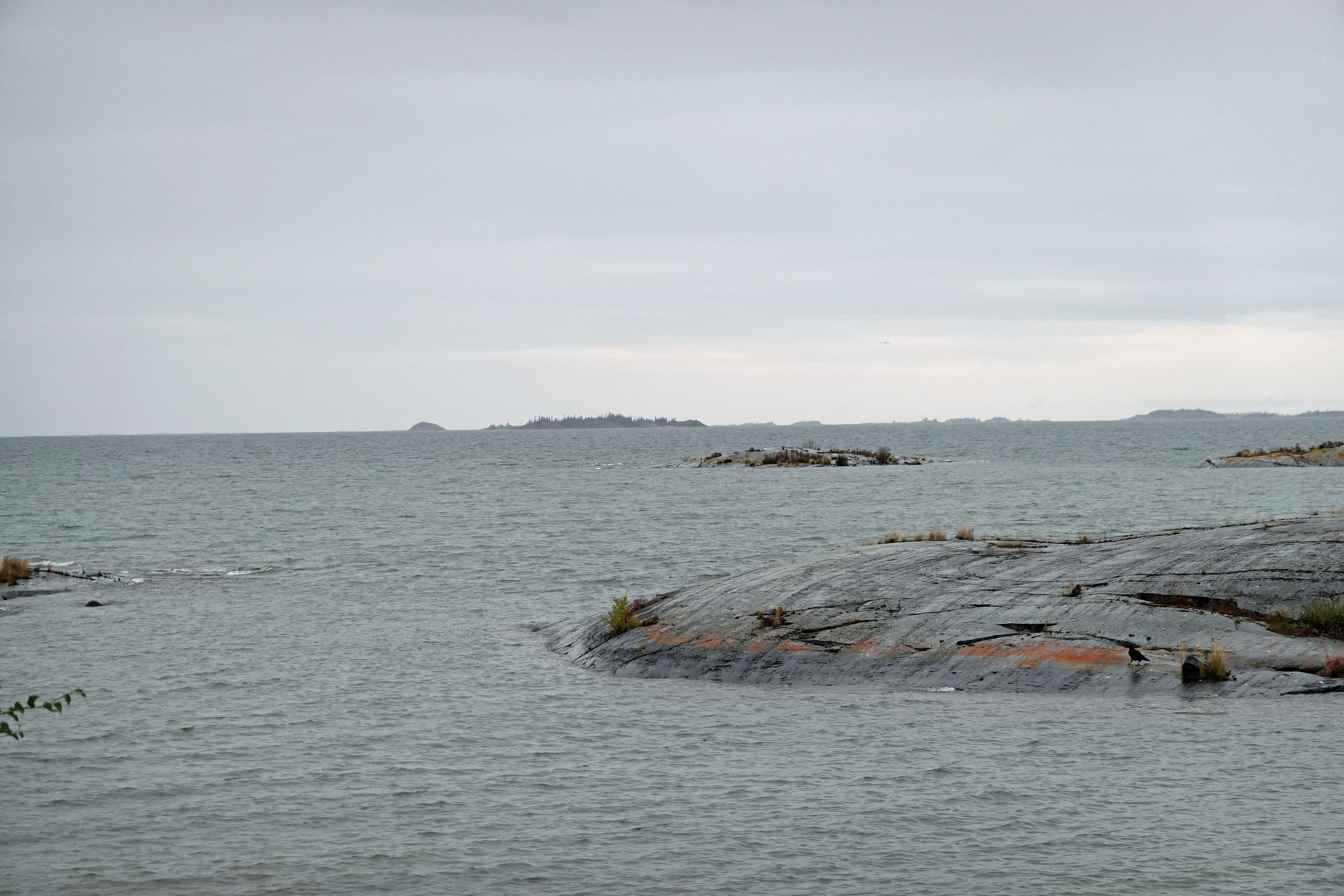
The Great Slave Lake at Dettah

== Climate ==
Dettah has a subarctic climate (Dfc) with long, severely cold winters and short but mild, sometimes warm summers. Dettah and Yellowknife experience the sunniest springs and summers out of all of Canada's cities.

Weather records are from Yellowknife Airport, approximately 9 km (5.6 mi) northwest of Dettah.

Climate data for Yellowknife (Yellowknife Airport) WMO ID: 71936; coordinates 62°27′46″N 114°26′25″W; elevation: 205.7 m (675 ft); 1991–2020 normals, extremes 1942–present
Month	Jan	Feb	Mar	Apr	May	Jun	Jul	Aug	Sep	Oct	Nov	Dec	Year
Record high humidex	2.9	6.1	8.9	20.2	28.5	34.0	35.4	34.3	27.2	18.1	6.3	1.6	35.4
Record high °C (°F)	3.4 (38.1)	6.2 (43.2)	9.3 (48.7)	20.4 (68.7)	28.5 (83.3)	31.1 (88.0)	32.5 (90.5)	32.6 (90.7)	26.1 (79.0)	19.0 (66.2)	7.8 (46.0)	2.8 (37.0)	32.6 (90.7)
Mean maximum °C (°F)	−7.3 (18.9)	−5.8 (21.6)	2.8 (37.0)	11.7 (53.1)	21.2 (70.2)	26.8 (80.2)	27.9 (82.2)	26.4 (79.5)	19.4 (66.9)	9.6 (49.3)	0.7 (33.3)	−4.8 (23.4)	29.0 (84.2)
Mean daily maximum °C (°F)	−21.6 (−6.9)	−18.0 (−0.4)	−10.6 (12.9)	0.3 (32.5)	10.4 (50.7)	18.6 (65.5)	21.5 (70.7)	18.4 (65.1)	10.9 (51.6)	1.5 (34.7)	−9.0 (15.8)	−18.0 (−0.4)	0.4 (32.7)
Daily mean °C (°F)	−25.5 (−13.9)	−22.7 (−8.9)	−16.6 (2.1)	−5.5 (22.1)	5.3 (41.5)	13.8 (56.8)	17.1 (62.8)	14.5 (58.1)	7.6 (45.7)	−1.0 (30.2)	−12.6 (9.3)	−21.8 (−7.2)	−4.0 (24.8)
Mean daily minimum °C (°F)	−29.4 (−20.9)	−27.4 (−17.3)	−22.5 (−8.5)	−11.3 (11.7)	0.1 (32.2)	9.0 (48.2)	12.6 (54.7)	10.5 (50.9)	4.2 (39.6)	−3.6 (25.5)	−16.2 (2.8)	−25.6 (−14.1)	−8.3 (17.1)
Mean minimum °C (°F)	−41.0 (−41.8)	−39.1 (−38.4)	−36.8 (−34.2)	−26.0 (−14.8)	−9.4 (15.1)	2.1 (35.8)	7.4 (45.3)	4.1 (39.4)	−2.3 (27.9)	−14.1 (6.6)	−29.6 (−21.3)	−38.4 (−37.1)	−42.2 (−44.0)
Record low °C (°F)	−51.2 (−60.2)	−51.2 (−60.2)	−43.3 (−45.9)	−40.6 (−41.1)	−22.8 (−9.0)	−4.4 (24.1)	0.6 (33.1)	−0.6 (30.9)	−9.7 (14.5)	−28.9 (−20.0)	−44.4 (−47.9)	−48.3 (−54.9)	−51.2 (−60.2)
Record low wind chill	−64.0	−61.0	−56.8	−53.2	−31.8	−11.2	0.0	−4.8	−16.4	−36.3	−54.7	−58.9	−64.0
Average precipitation mm (inches)	15.0 (0.59)	11.0 (0.43)	14.1 (0.56)	11.6 (0.46)	16.3 (0.64)	28.9 (1.14)	40.4 (1.59)	44.0 (1.73)	43.0 (1.69)	28.8 (1.13)	25.8 (1.02)	15.1 (0.59)	293.9 (11.57)
Average rainfall mm (inches)	0.0 (0.0)	0.0 (0.0)	0.2 (0.01)	2.9 (0.11)	12.2 (0.48)	28.0 (1.10)	40.4 (1.59)	44.0 (1.73)	39.9 (1.57)	12.0 (0.47)	0.5 (0.02)	0.0 (0.0)	180.2 (7.09)
Average snowfall cm (inches)	21.7 (8.5)	16.1 (6.3)	19.2 (7.6)	9.9 (3.9)	4.5 (1.8)	0.0 (0.0)	0.0 (0.0)	0.0 (0.0)	3.0 (1.2)	20.1 (7.9)	36.9 (14.5)	23.7 (9.3)	155.0 (61.0)
Average precipitation days (≥ 0.2 mm)	11.1	9.3	8.6	4.8	5.7	7.0	9.5	11.2	12.2	13.7	14.6	11.5	119.1
Average rainy days (≥ 0.2 mm)	0.09	0.04	0.25	1.2	4.4	6.8	9.5	11.2	11.6	5.8	0.82	0.13	51.9
Average snowy days (≥ 0.2 cm)	12.4	10.3	9.5	4.1	1.9	0.04	0.0	0.0	1.2	9.6	16.0	13.2	78.2
Average relative humidity (%) (at 15:00 LST)	68.5	64.6	56.4	52.8	46.0	45.3	49.0	57.1	64.7	75.9	80.7	73.0	61.2
Average dew point °C (°F)	−28.9 (−20.0)	−26.6 (−15.9)	−21.6 (−6.9)	−11.6 (11.1)	−3.1 (26.4)	4.6 (40.3)	8.8 (47.8)	8.4 (47.1)	3.4 (38.1)	−3.7 (25.3)	−14.8 (5.4)	−25.0 (−13.0)	−9.1 (15.6)
Mean monthly sunshine hours	50.6	107.3	188.4	276.4	335.7	373.8	358.0	276.2	157.7	65.0	42.7	24.6	2,256.5
Percentage possible sunshine	26.8	43.5	51.8	62.2	60.8	63.0	61.2	55.5	40.3	21.0	20.2	15.4	43.5
Average ultraviolet index	0	0	1	2	4	5	5	4	2	1	0	0	2
Source 1: Environment and Climate Change Canada (sun 1981–2010) (May maximum} (August maximum)
Source 2: Weather Atlas (dew point, mean maximum, and mean minimum)
