= Richard Edjericon =

Canadian politician

Richard Edjericon MLA

Member of the Legislative Assembly of the Northwest Territories
- Incumbent
- Assumed office February 21, 2022
- Preceded by: Steve Norn
- Constituency: Tu Nedhé-Wiilideh

Personal details
- Party: non-partisan consensus government

Richard Edjericon is a Canadian politician in the Northwest Territories. He was elected to the Legislative Assembly of the Northwest Territories in a 2022 by-election, representing the electoral district of Tu Nedhé-Wiilideh. Edjericon previously ran for the seat in the 2019 election, placing second behind to Steve Norn.

Edjericon is a former chief of the Yellowknives Dene First Nation, during which he signed the Akaitcho Framework Agreement. Previously, he was also a member of the band council for ten years and was the band housing manager. He has also served six years as the chair of the Mackenzie Valley Impact Review Board. Edjericon has lived in Ndilǫ since 1993.

== Election results ==
2023 Northwest Territories general election: Tu Nedhé-Wiilideh
Candidate	Votes	%
Richard Edjericon (I)	221	87.01
Nadine Delorme	33	12.99
Total votes	254	

Northwest Territories territorial by-election, 2022: Tu Nedhé-Wiilideh Expulsion of Steve Norn
Candidate	Votes
Richard Edjericon	186
Mary Rose Sundberg	99
Steve Norn	70
Ernest Betsina	62
Nadine Delorme	12
Clinton Unka	10
Total valid votes	439

2019 Northwest Territories general election: Tu Nedhé-Wiilideh
Candidate	Votes	%
Steve Norn	206	36
Richard Edjericon	128	23
Lila Fraser Erasmus	115	21
Paul Betsina	102	18
Nadine Delorme	8	1
Total valid votes / Turnout	557	68.51

2015 Northwest Territories general election: Tu Nedhé-Wiilideh
Candidate	Votes	%
Tom Beaulieu	410	69.85
Richard Edjericon	177	30.15
Total valid votes	587	
Eligible voters / Turnout	822	71.41
