= Ndilǫ =

- Yellowknives Dene First Nation (Ndilǫ)
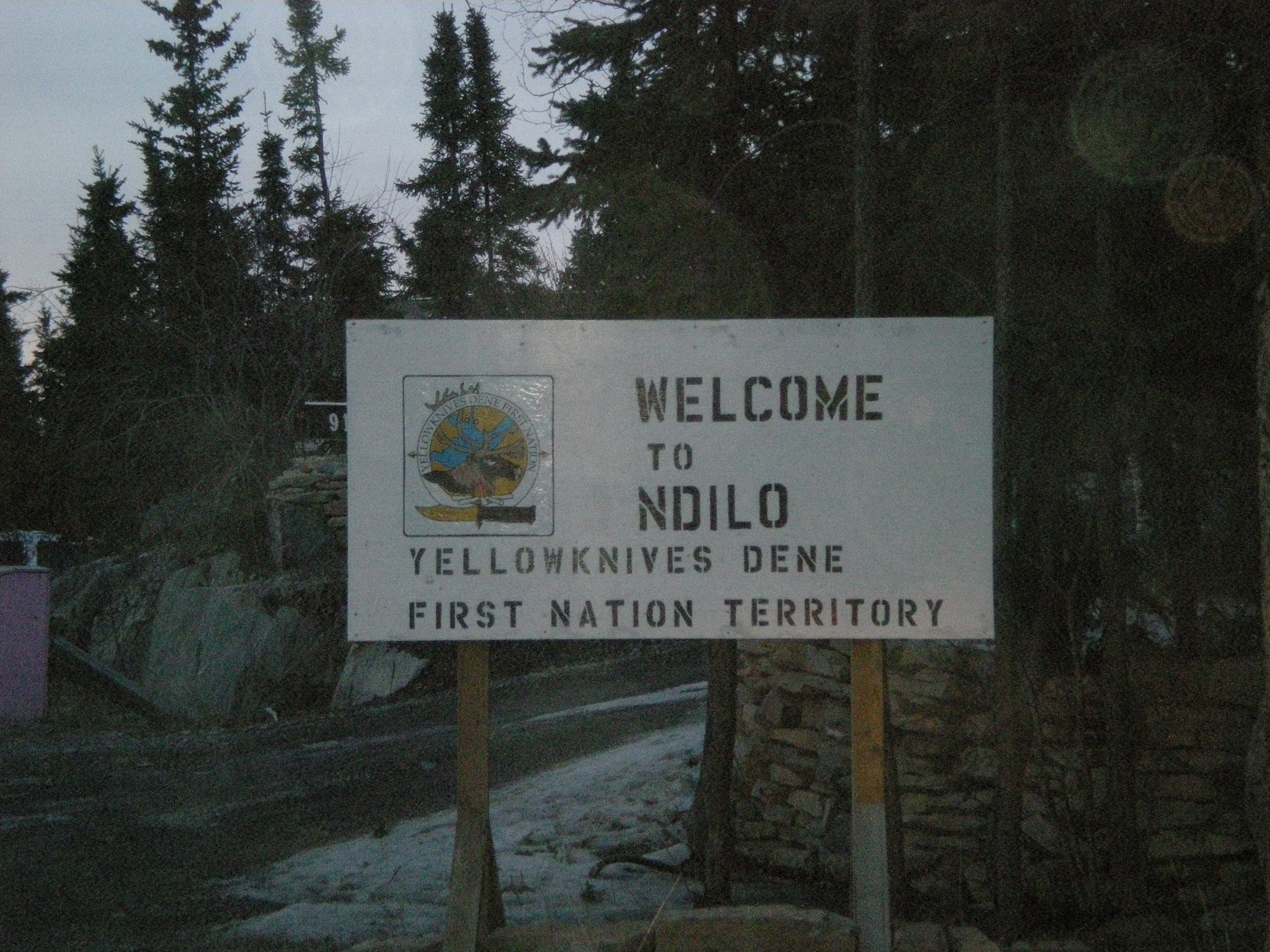

- Location within Northwest Territories
- Coordinates: 62°28′25″N 114°20′10″W
- Country: Canada
- Territory: Northwest Territories
- Region: North Slave Region
- Territorial electoral district: Tu Nedhé-Wiilideh
- Census division: Region 6

Government
  - Chief: Fred Sangris
  - Councilors: Leroy Betsina, Philip J. Goulet, Jeff Rosnawski, Lawrence Goulet, & Cecelie Beaulieu
  - Chief Executive Officer: Ryan Peters
  - MLA: Richard Edjericon
- Elevation: 157 m (515 ft)

Population (2016)GNWT estimate
  - Total: 321
- Time zone: UTC−07:00 (MST)
  - Summer (DST): UTC−06:00 (MDT)
- Canadian Postal code: X1A
- Area code: 867
- Website: www.ykdene.com

Ndilǫ /ˈdiːloʊ/ is a First Nations community in the North Slave Region of the Northwest Territories, Canada. The small Dene community is on the edge of Yellowknife on the tip of Latham Island. It had a population of approximately 321 people in 2016. Ndilǫ and Dettah are the communities of the Yellowknives. Ndilǫ is represented by the Yellowknives Dene First Nation (Ndilǫ) and are part of the Akaitcho Territory Government. The Ndilǫ traditionally speak the Dene dialects Wíílíídeh and Chipewyan (Denesuline).

The land was set aside for use by status Indians by the Government of Canada in 1947 and was called 'Lot 500' on the official register. In 1959, the government built the first ten permanent houses for Dene families. They were colourful homes and so people began referring to the community as 'Rainbow Valley'. In the 1970s there were 200 residents living in 20 houses. The name was officially changed to Ndilǫ in 1991, which means "end of the island" in the local Dene dialect.

The community hosts a public school, the K'àlemì Dene School, a band office and headquarters for Det’on Cho, a First Nations investment company.

== Climate ==
Ndilǫ has a subarctic climate (Dfc) with mild to warm summers and long cold winters.

Weather records are from Yellowknife Airport, approximately 5 km (3.1 mi) west of Ndilǫ.

Climate data for Yellowknife (Yellowknife Airport) WMO ID: 71936; coordinates 62°27′46″N 114°26′25″W; elevation: 205.7 m (675 ft); 1991–2020 normals, extremes 1942–present
Month	Jan	Feb	Mar	Apr	May	Jun	Jul	Aug	Sep	Oct	Nov	Dec	Year
Record high humidex	2.9	6.1	8.9	20.2	28.5	34.0	35.4	34.3	27.2	18.1	6.3	1.6	35.4
Record high °C (°F)	3.4 (38.1)	6.2 (43.2)	9.3 (48.7)	20.4 (68.7)	28.5 (83.3)	31.1 (88.0)	32.5 (90.5)	32.6 (90.7)	26.1 (79.0)	19.0 (66.2)	7.8 (46.0)	2.8 (37.0)	32.6 (90.7)
Mean maximum °C (°F)	−7.3 (18.9)	−5.8 (21.6)	2.8 (37.0)	11.7 (53.1)	21.2 (70.2)	26.8 (80.2)	27.9 (82.2)	26.4 (79.5)	19.4 (66.9)	9.6 (49.3)	0.7 (33.3)	−4.8 (23.4)	29.0 (84.2)
Mean daily maximum °C (°F)	−21.6 (−6.9)	−18.0 (−0.4)	−10.6 (12.9)	0.3 (32.5)	10.4 (50.7)	18.6 (65.5)	21.5 (70.7)	18.4 (65.1)	10.9 (51.6)	1.5 (34.7)	−9.0 (15.8)	−18.0 (−0.4)	0.4 (32.7)
Daily mean °C (°F)	−25.5 (−13.9)	−22.7 (−8.9)	−16.6 (2.1)	−5.5 (22.1)	5.3 (41.5)	13.8 (56.8)	17.1 (62.8)	14.5 (58.1)	7.6 (45.7)	−1.0 (30.2)	−12.6 (9.3)	−21.8 (−7.2)	−4.0 (24.8)
Mean daily minimum °C (°F)	−29.4 (−20.9)	−27.4 (−17.3)	−22.5 (−8.5)	−11.3 (11.7)	0.1 (32.2)	9.0 (48.2)	12.6 (54.7)	10.5 (50.9)	4.2 (39.6)	−3.6 (25.5)	−16.2 (2.8)	−25.6 (−14.1)	−8.3 (17.1)
Mean minimum °C (°F)	−41.0 (−41.8)	−39.1 (−38.4)	−36.8 (−34.2)	−26.0 (−14.8)	−9.4 (15.1)	2.1 (35.8)	7.4 (45.3)	4.1 (39.4)	−2.3 (27.9)	−14.1 (6.6)	−29.6 (−21.3)	−38.4 (−37.1)	−42.2 (−44.0)
Record low °C (°F)	−51.2 (−60.2)	−51.2 (−60.2)	−43.3 (−45.9)	−40.6 (−41.1)	−22.8 (−9.0)	−4.4 (24.1)	0.6 (33.1)	−0.6 (30.9)	−9.7 (14.5)	−28.9 (−20.0)	−44.4 (−47.9)	−48.3 (−54.9)	−51.2 (−60.2)
Record low wind chill	−64.0	−61.0	−56.8	−53.2	−31.8	−11.2	0.0	−4.8	−16.4	−36.3	−54.7	−58.9	−64.0
Average precipitation mm (inches)	15.0 (0.59)	11.0 (0.43)	14.1 (0.56)	11.6 (0.46)	16.3 (0.64)	28.9 (1.14)	40.4 (1.59)	44.0 (1.73)	43.0 (1.69)	28.8 (1.13)	25.8 (1.02)	15.1 (0.59)	293.9 (11.57)
Average rainfall mm (inches)	0.0 (0.0)	0.0 (0.0)	0.2 (0.01)	2.9 (0.11)	12.2 (0.48)	28.0 (1.10)	40.4 (1.59)	44.0 (1.73)	39.9 (1.57)	12.0 (0.47)	0.5 (0.02)	0.0 (0.0)	180.2 (7.09)
Average snowfall cm (inches)	21.7 (8.5)	16.1 (6.3)	19.2 (7.6)	9.9 (3.9)	4.5 (1.8)	0.0 (0.0)	0.0 (0.0)	0.0 (0.0)	3.0 (1.2)	20.1 (7.9)	36.9 (14.5)	23.7 (9.3)	155.0 (61.0)
Average precipitation days (≥ 0.2 mm)	11.1	9.3	8.6	4.8	5.7	7.0	9.5	11.2	12.2	13.7	14.6	11.5	119.1
Average rainy days (≥ 0.2 mm)	0.09	0.04	0.25	1.2	4.4	6.8	9.5	11.2	11.6	5.8	0.82	0.13	51.9
Average snowy days (≥ 0.2 cm)	12.4	10.3	9.5	4.1	1.9	0.04	0.0	0.0	1.2	9.6	16.0	13.2	78.2
Average relative humidity (%) (at 15:00 LST)	68.5	64.6	56.4	52.8	46.0	45.3	49.0	57.1	64.7	75.9	80.7	73.0	61.2
Average dew point °C (°F)	−28.9 (−20.0)	−26.6 (−15.9)	−21.6 (−6.9)	−11.6 (11.1)	−3.1 (26.4)	4.6 (40.3)	8.8 (47.8)	8.4 (47.1)	3.4 (38.1)	−3.7 (25.3)	−14.8 (5.4)	−25.0 (−13.0)	−9.1 (15.6)
Mean monthly sunshine hours	50.6	107.3	188.4	276.4	335.7	373.8	358.0	276.2	157.7	65.0	42.7	24.6	2,256.5
Percentage possible sunshine	26.8	43.5	51.8	62.2	60.8	63.0	61.2	55.5	40.3	21.0	20.2	15.4	43.5
Average ultraviolet index	0	0	1	2	4	5	5	4	2	1	0	0	2
Source 1: Environment and Climate Change Canada (sun 1981–2010) (May maximum} (August maximum)
Source 2: Weather Atlas (dew point, mean maximum, and mean minimum)

== Noted residents ==
- Michel Sikyea
