= Great Slave Lake =

Lake in the Northwest Territories, Canada

- Grand lac des Esclaves (French); Tıdeè (Tłı̨chǫ Yatıì); Tinde’e (Wıìlıìdeh Yatii/Tetsǫ́t’ıné Yatıé); Tu Nedhé (Dëne Sųłıné Yatıé); Tucho (Dehcho Dene Zhatıé)
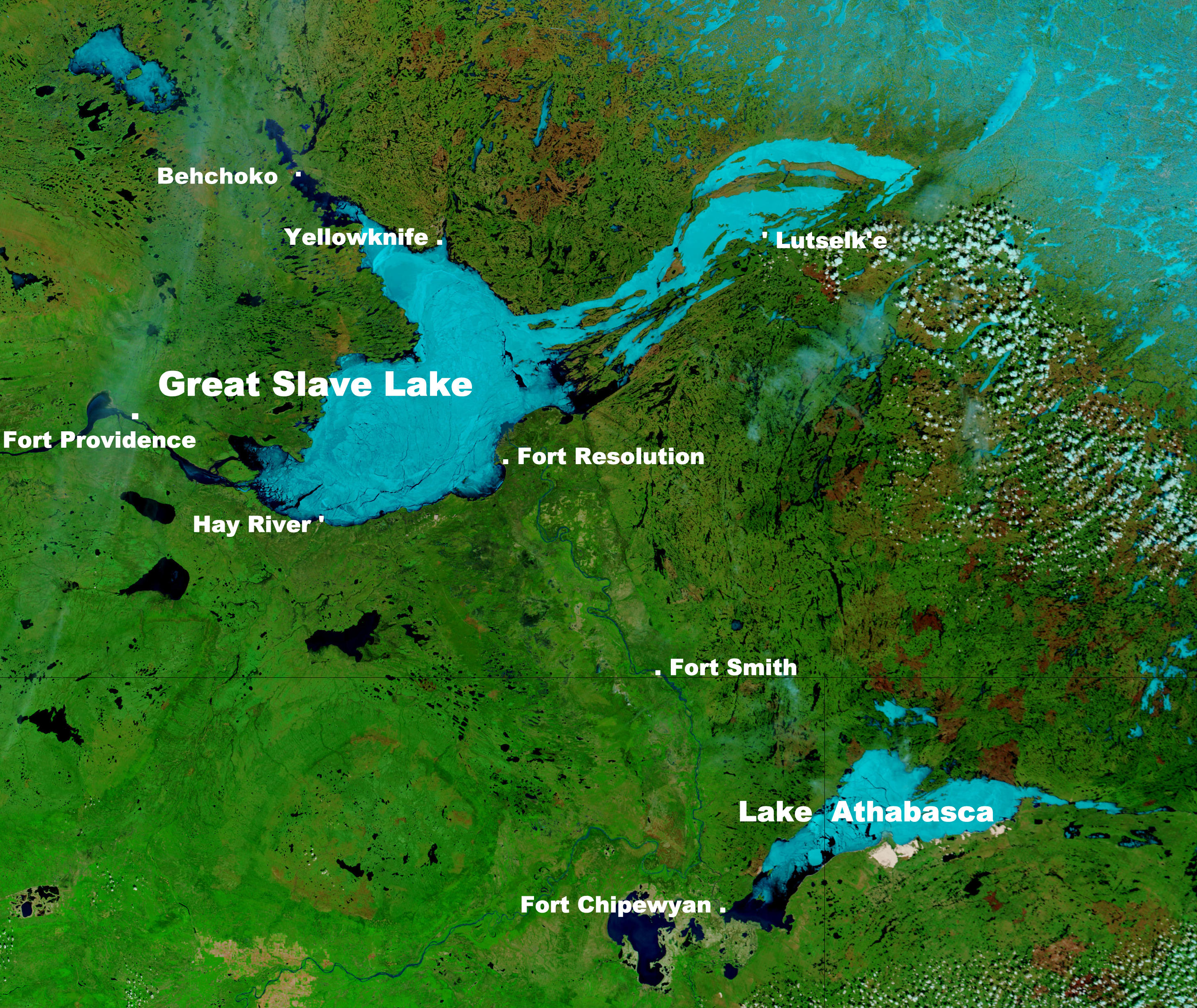
- NASA photo of Great Slave Lake and Lake Athabasca

- Location within Northwest Territories
- Interactive map of Great Slave Lake
- Location: Northwest Territories
- Coordinates: 61°30′01″N 114°00′04″W
- Lake type: Glacial
- Primary inflows: Hay River, Slave River, Taltson River, Lockhart River, Yellowknife River, Snare River (through Marian Lake and Frank Channel), Marian River (through Marian Lake and Frank Channel), Stark River
- Primary outflows: Mackenzie River
- Catchment area: 971,000 km^{2} (375,000 sq mi)
- Basin countries: Canada
- Max. length: 469 km (291 mi)
- Max. width: 203 km (126 mi)
- Surface area: 27,200 km^{2} (10,500 sq mi)
- Average depth: 41 m (135 ft)
- Max. depth: 614 m (2,014 ft)
- Water volume: 1,115 km^{3} (268 cu mi)/
- Shore length^{1}: 3,057 km (1,900 mi)
- Surface elevation: 156 m (512 ft)
- Frozen: November - mid June
- Settlements: Yellowknife, Hay River, Behchokǫ̀, Fort Resolution, Łutselk'e, Hay River Reserve, Dettah, Ndilǫ
- ^{1} Shore length is not a well-defined measure.

Great Slave Lake (Note: (French: Grand lac des Esclaves), known traditionally as Tıdeè in Tłı̨chǫ Yatıì (Dogrib), Tinde’e in Wıìlıìdeh Yatii / Tetsǫ́t’ıné Yatıé (Dogrib/Chipewyan), Tu Nedhé in Dëne Sųłıné Yatıé (Chipewyan), and Tucho in Dehcho Dene Zhatıé (Slavey),) is the second-largest lake in the Northwest Territories, Canada (after Great Bear Lake), the deepest lake in North America at 614 m (2,014 ft), and the tenth-largest lake in the world by area. It is 469 km (291 mi) long and 20 to 203 km (12 to 126 mi) wide. It covers an area of 27,200 km^{2} (10,500 sq mi) in the southern part of the territory. Its given volume ranges from 1,070 km^{3} (260 cu mi) to 1,580 km^{3} (380 cu mi) and up to 2,088 km^{3} (501 cu mi) making it the 13th largest by volume.

The lake shares its name with the Dene, a group of First Nations peoples, who were called Slavey by their enemies, the Cree. Towns situated on the lake include (clockwise from east) Łutselk'e, Fort Resolution, Hay River, Hay River Reserve, Behchokǫ̀, Yellowknife, Ndilǫ, and Dettah. The only community in the East Arm is Łutselk'e, a hamlet of about 350 people, largely Chipewyan Indigenous peoples of the Dene Nation, and the abandoned winter camp and Hudson's Bay Company post Fort Reliance. Along the south shore, east of Hay River is the abandoned Pine Point Mine and the company town of Pine Point.

== History ==
Indigenous peoples were the first settlers around the lake after the retreat of glacial ice. Archaeological evidence has revealed several different periods of cultural history, including the Northern Plano tradition (8,000 years before present), Shield Archaic tradition (6,500 years), Arctic small tool tradition (3,500 years), and the Taltheilei Shale tradition (2,500 years before present). Each culture has left a distinct mark in the archaeological record based on type or size of lithic tools.

Great Slave Lake was put on European maps during the emergence of the fur trade towards the northwest from Hudson Bay in the mid-18th century. The name refers to the Slavey people, who lived on the lake's southern shores at the time and were known to the Cree as the Awokanek ("slaves"). As the first French explorers dealt directly with Cree traders, they referred to the lake as "Grand lac des Esclaves", which was eventually translated into English as "Great Slave Lake".

In the 1930s, gold was discovered on the North Arm of Great Slave Lake. This discovery led to the establishment of Yellowknife, which would become the capital of the NWT. In 1960, an all-season highway was built around the west side of the lake; the highway was originally an extension of the Mackenzie Highway, but became known as Yellowknife Highway or Highway 3.

On 24 January 1978, a Soviet Radar Ocean Reconnaissance Satellite named Kosmos 954, which contained an onboard nuclear reactor, fell from orbit and disintegrated. Pieces of the nuclear core fell in the vicinity of Great Slave Lake. Some of the nuclear debris was recovered by a joint effort of Canadian Armed Forces, United States Armed Forces, and U.S. Nuclear Emergency Support Team personnel in an operation called Operation Morning Light.

=== Suggested renaming ===
In the late 2010s, many place-names within the Northwest Territories were changed in Canadian English to their local indigenous names. The same has been suggested for Great Slave Lake, which “is actually a very terrible name, unless you're a proponent of slavery," says Dëneze Nakehk'o, a Northwest Territories educator and founding member of First Nations organization Dene Nahjo. "It's a beautiful place. It's majestic; it's huge. And I don't really think the current name on the map is fitting for that place." He has suggested Tu Nedhé, the Dene Soline name for the lake, as an alternative. Tucho, the Dehcho Dene term for the lake, has also been suggested.

== Geography and natural history ==
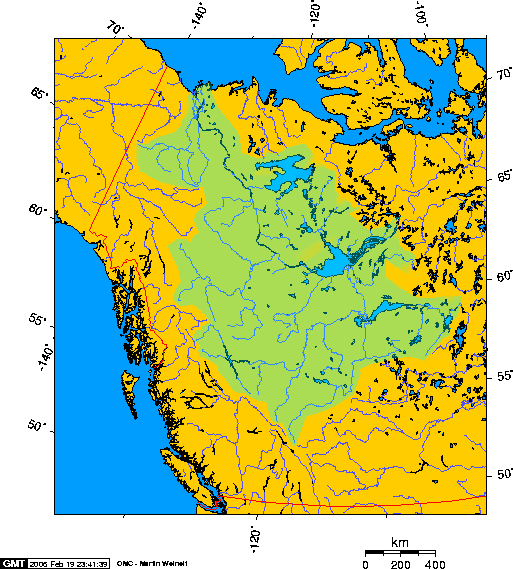
Mackenzie River drainage basin showing Great Slave Lake's position in the Western Canadian Arctic

The Hay, Slave (which in turn includes the Peace), Lockhart, and Taltson Rivers are its chief tributaries. It is drained by the Mackenzie River. Though the western shore is forested, the east shore and northern arm are tundra-like. The southern and eastern shores reach the edge of the Canadian Shield. Along with other lakes such as the Great Bear and Athabasca, it is a remnant of the vast glacial Lake McConnell.

The lake has a very irregular shoreline. The East Arm of Great Slave Lake is filled with islands, and the area is within the proposed Thaidene Nene National Park Reserve. The Pethei Peninsula separates the East Arm into McLeod Bay in the north and Christie Bay in the south. The lake is at least partially frozen during an average of eight months of the year.

The main western portion of the lake forms a moderately deep bowl with a surface area of 18,500 km^{2} (7,100 sq mi) and a volume of 596 km^{3} (143 cu mi). This main portion has a maximum depth of 187.7 m (616 ft) and a mean depth of 32.2 m (106 ft). To the east, McLeod Bay (62°52′N 110°10′W) and Christie Bay (62°32′N 111°00′W) are much deeper, with a maximum recorded depth in Christie Bay of 614 m (2,014 ft).

On some of the plains surrounding Great Slave Lake, climax polygonal bogs have formed, the early successional stage to which often consists of pioneer black spruce.

South of Great Slave Lake, in a remote corner of Wood Buffalo National Park, is the Whooping Crane Summer Range, a nesting site of a remnant flock of whooping cranes, discovered in 1954.

=== Ecology ===
The Slave River provides the basin with high nutrient levels; accordingly, coupled with a general absence of pollution and invasive species, the lake is rich in aquatic life relative to its biome. Fish species include lake whitefish, lake trout, inconnu, northern pike and walleye, cisco, burbot, ninespine stickleback, shiner, also longnose sucker. Lake whitefish enjoy the highest levels, followed by cisco and suckers. Climate change, specifically reduced ice coverage times, is affecting the populations of these species. Copepoda are also prevalent in the lake.

== Bodies of water and tributaries ==
Rivers that flow into Great Slave Lake include (going clockwise from the community of Behchokǫ̀):

- Emile River
- Snare River
- Wecho River
- Stagg River
- Yellowknife River
- Beaulieu River
- Waldron River
- Hoarfrost River
- Lockhart River
- Snowdrift River
- La Loche River
- Thubun River
- Terhul River
- Taltson River
- Slave River
- Little Buffalo River
- Buffalo River
- Hay River
- Mosquito Creek
- Duport River
- Marian Lake
- North Arm
- Yellowknife Bay
- Resolution Bay
- Deep Bay
- McLeod Bay
- Christie Bay
- Sulphur Cove
- Presqu'ile Cove
- Rocher River
- Frank Channel

== Ice road ==
Great Slave Lake has one ice road known as the Dettah ice road. It is a 6.5 km (4.0 mi) road that connects the Northwest Territories capital of Yellowknife to Dettah, a small First Nations fishing community also in the Northwest Territories. To reach the community in summer the drive is 27 km (17 mi) via the Ingraham Trail.

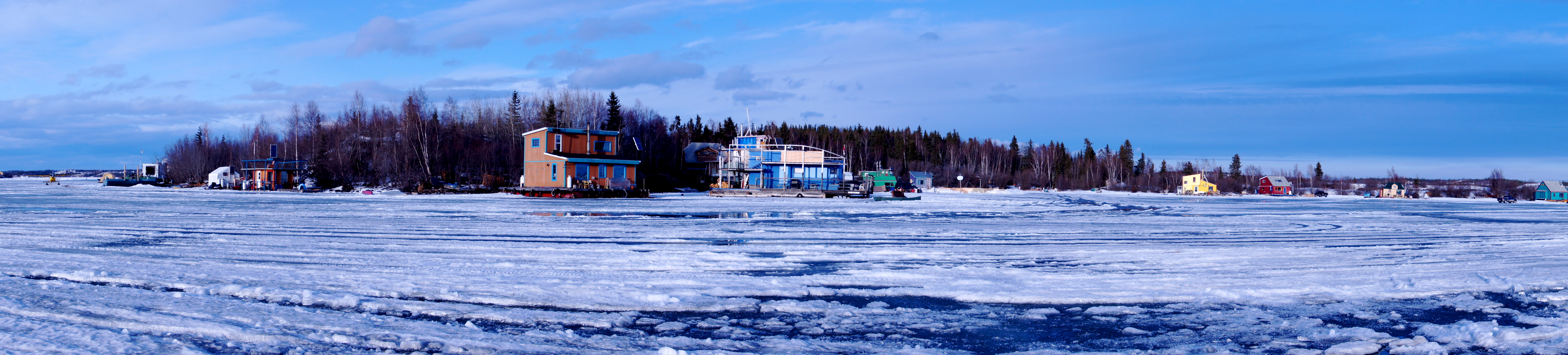
Yellowknife Bay in April 2012. The surface melt begins to make transportation more difficult between the houseboats near Jolliffe Island.

== In popular culture ==
=== Television ===
From 2014 to 2016, Animal Planet aired a documentary series called Ice Lake Rebels. It takes place on Great Slave Lake, and details the lives of houseboaters on the lake.

Seasons 6 and 7 of the survival game show Alone were set along the shore of the east arm of Great Slave Lake in the subarctic, about 400 km (250 mi) south of the Arctic Circle and about 110 km (70 mi) south of the tree line. It follows the self-documented daily struggles of 10 individuals as they survive alone in the wilderness for as long as possible using a limited amount of survival equipment.

== See also ==
- Mackenzie Northern Railway
