= Yellowknives Dene First Nation =

First Nations band government in the Northwest Territories, Canada

- Band No. 763
- People: Yellowknives
- Treaty: Treaty 8
- Headquarters: Ndilǫ; Dettah
- Territory: Northwest Territories

Population (2021)
- On reserve: 11
- On other land: 771
- Off reserve: 835
- Total population: 1,617

Government
- Chief: Ernest Betsina

Tribal Council
- Akaitcho Territory Government

Website
- ykdene.com

The Yellowknives Dene First Nation is a band government in the Northwest Territories. It represents the Yellowknives people, the namesake of the territorial capital Yellowknife. Its membership primarily resides in two communities: Ndilǫ, bordering the City of Yellowknife at the tip of Latham Island, and Dettah, separated from the city by Yellowknife Bay. The Yellowknives Dene traditionally speak the local Wíílíídeh dialect, which falls under the dene language.
