= Akaitcho Territory Government =

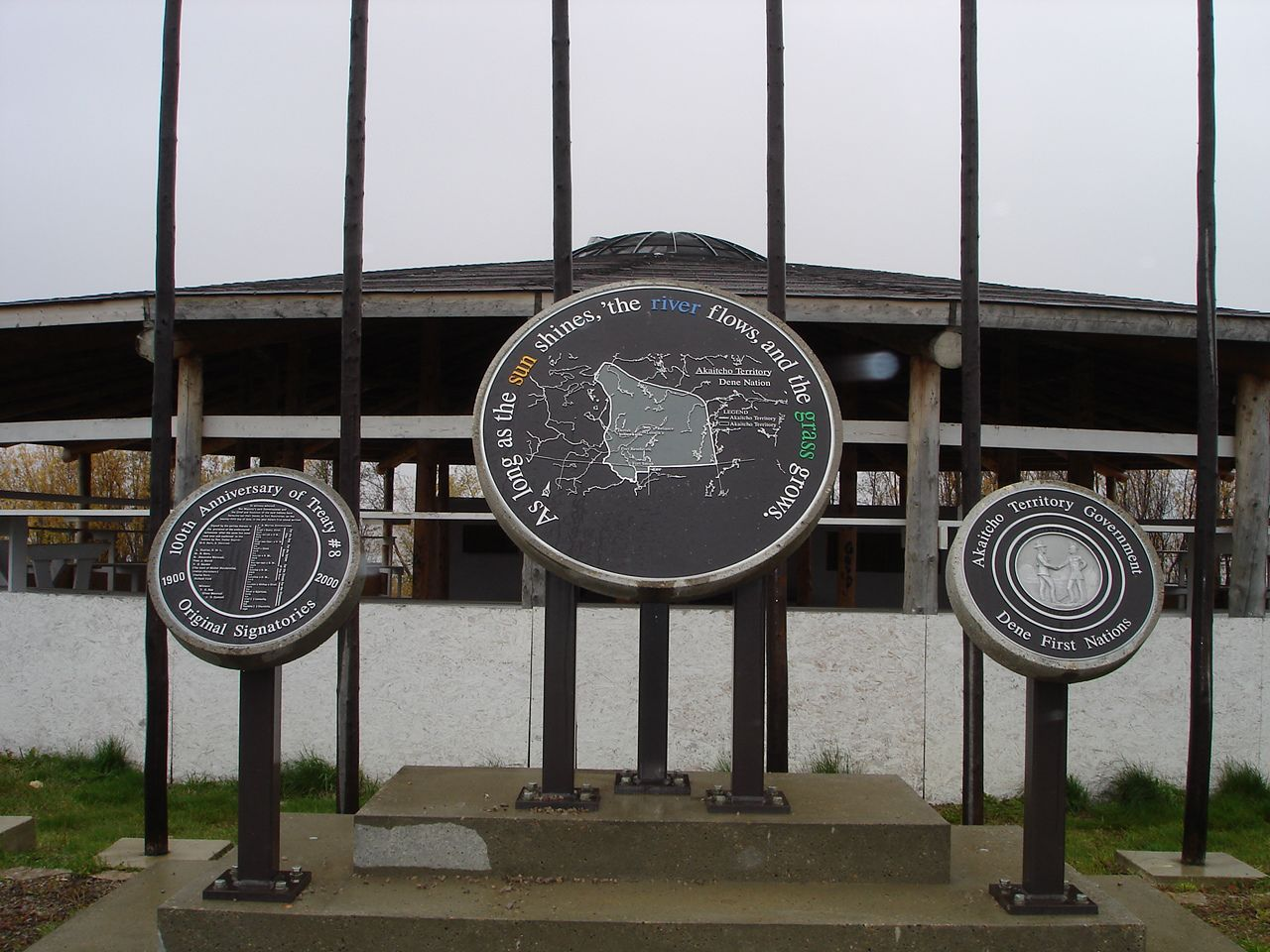
Treaty 8 site in Fort Resolution

The Akaitcho Territory Government is a First Nations organization representing the Dene people of the Northwest Territories, Canada.

== Members ==
The Akaitcho Territory Government consists of the following:

- Deninu Kųę́ First Nation - Fort Resolution
- Łutsël K'é Dene First Nation - Lutselk'e
- Salt River First Nation - Fort Smith
- Smith's Landing First Nation - Fort Smith
- Yellowknives Dene First Nation - Dettah and Ndilǫ, both adjacent to Yellowknife
