= Nonacho Lake =

Canadian lake

- Location within Northwest Territories

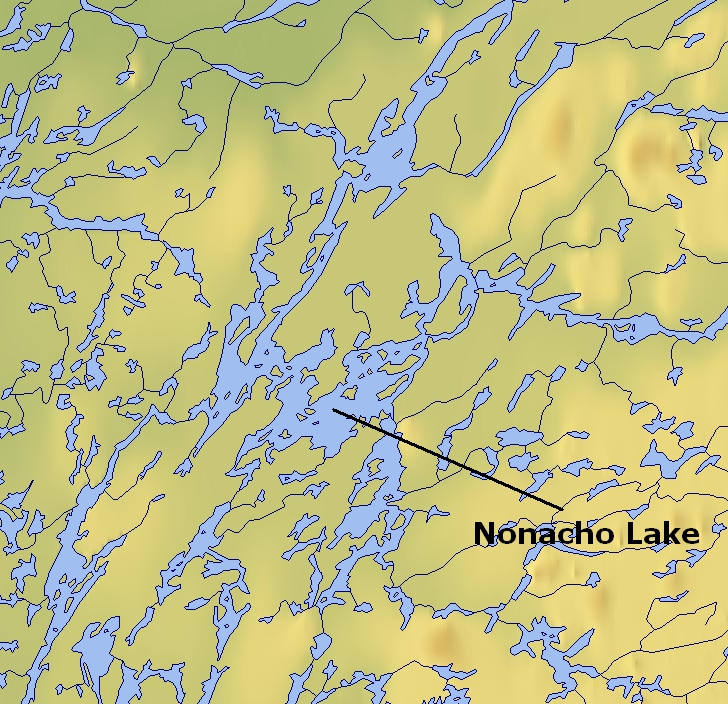
- Location: Northwest Territories
- Coordinates: 61°43′N 109°24′W
- Basin countries: Canada
- Surface area: 697 km^{2} (269 sq mi)
- Surface elevation: 354 m (1,161 ft)

Nonacho Lake is the eighth largest lake in the Northwest Territories, Canada.

== See also ==
- List of lakes in the Northwest Territories
