= Fort Resolution =

Fort Resolution Denı́nu Kų́ę́
- Hamlet
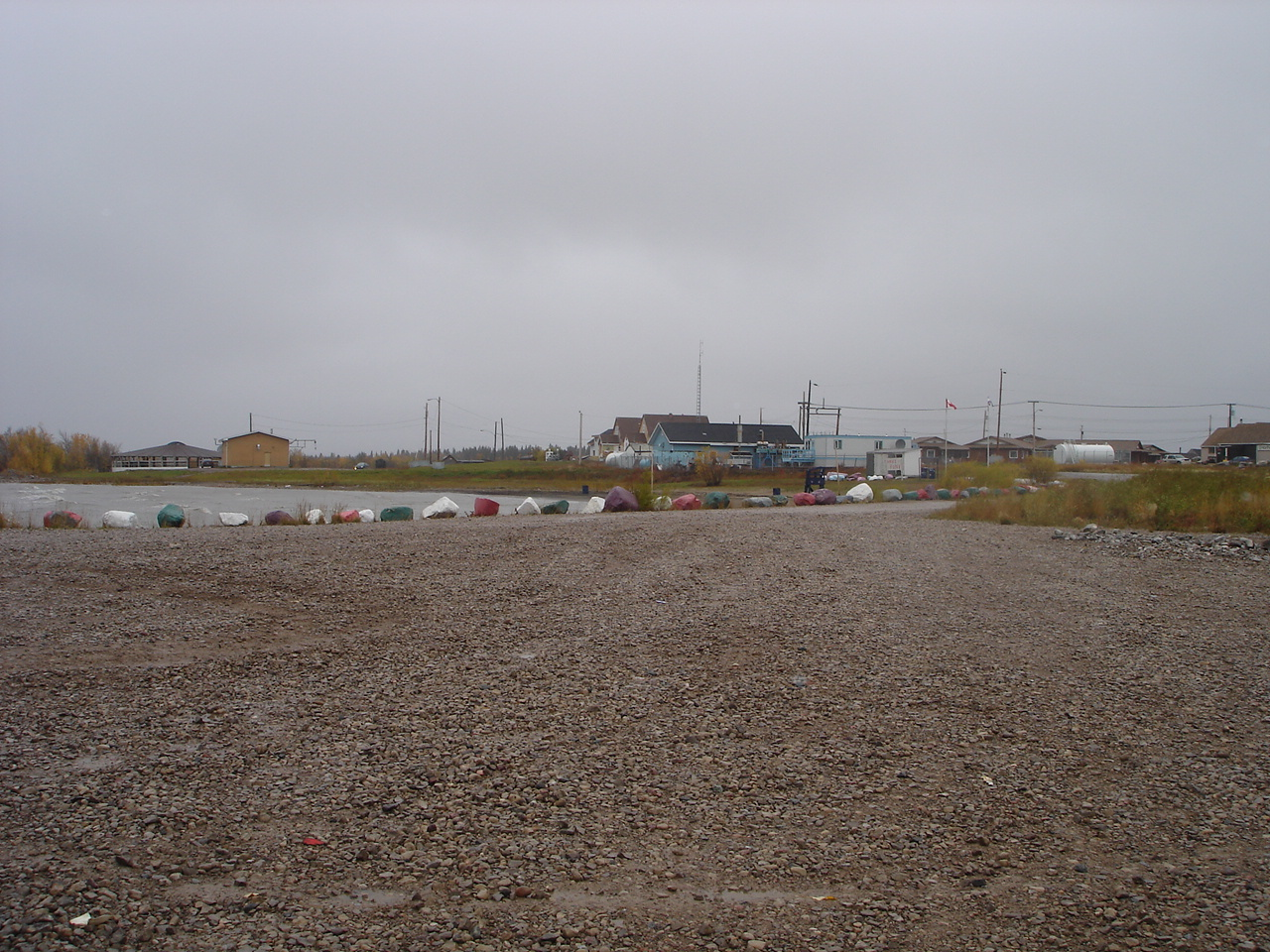

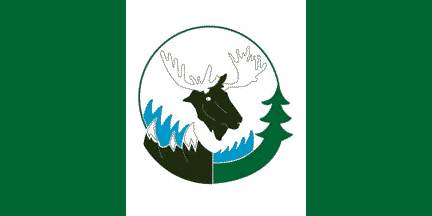
- Flag

- Location within Northwest Territories Location within Canada
- Coordinates: 61°10′18″N 113°40′18″W
- Country: Canada
- Territory: Northwest Territories
- Region: South Slave Region
- Territorial electoral district: Tu Nedhé-Wiilideh
- Census division: Region 5
- Hamlet: 5 January 2011

Government
  - Mayor, Chief & President: Mayor-Patrick Simon, Chief-Louis Balsillie, President-Arthur Marsden Beck
  - Senior Administrative Officer: Tom Beaulieu
  - MLA: Steve Norn

Area
  - Land: 455.22 km^{2} (175.76 sq mi)
- Elevation: 160 m (520 ft)

Population (2016)
  - Total: 470
  - Density: 1/km^{2} (2.6/sq mi)
- Time zone: UTC−06:00 (Northwest Territories Time)
- Canadian Postal code: X0E 0M0
- Area code: 867
- Telephone exchange: 394
- Living cost: 142.5^{A}
- Food price index: 144.0^{B}
- Climate: Dsc
- Sources: Department of Municipal and Community Affairs, Prince of Wales Northern Heritage Centre, Canada Flight Supplement^A2013 figure based on Edmonton = 100^B2015 figure based on Yellowknife = 100

Fort Resolution (Denı́nu Kų́ę́ (pronounced "deh-nih-noo-kwenh") "moose island place") is a hamlet in the South Slave Region of the Northwest Territories, Canada. The community is situated at the mouth of the Slave River, on the shores of Great Slave Lake, and at the end of the Fort Resolution Highway (Highway 6). It is the headquarters of the Deninu Kųę́ First Nation, whose Chief is Louis Balsillie. It is the Headquarters of the Fort Resolution Metis Government, whose President is Arthur Beck.

It is the oldest documented European community in the Northwest Territories, built in 1819, and was a key link in the fur trade's water route north. Fort Resolution is designated as a National Historic Site of Canada as the oldest continuously occupied place in the Northwest Territories with origins in the fur trade and the principal fur trade post on Great Slave Lake.

Fort Resolution's Deninoo School offers K-12 schooling. The town also has a hockey arena, community hall, a nursing station, a youth centre, Royal Canadian Mounted Police, a bed and breakfast, a 'Northern' general store, a convenience store, one diner, and two gas stations. Fort Resolution Airport services charter and medivac flights only. The oldest building in town is the historic Roman Catholic Church, built in the early 19th century; there is also a Protestant church in the hamlet. The beach along Great Slave Lake is a prime spot for summer swimming, bird watching, fishing or relaxing. Local people engage in fishing, hunting, and trapping year-round.

The nearby site of Pine Point was once a thriving lead mine. When the value of lead plummeted in the 1980s, the Pine Point Mine closed, and the township was evacuated. Pine Point houses were sold cheaply, and many of the buildings were then moved to Fort Resolution (including the hockey arena), Hay River and Northern Alberta.

Deninoo Days in late August celebrate the beginning of moose hunting season with parades, traditional races, games and talent competitions. Recreational opportunities include camping, canoeing and fishing (self-guided, or available through several outfitters). Little Buffalo River Crossing is a nearby territorial park, with historical and natural attractions, accessible by road and featuring a campground with 12 sites.

== Demographics ==
Federal census population history of Fort Resolution
Year	Pop.	±%
1976	600	—
1981	480	−20.0%
1986	447	−6.9%
1991	515	+15.2%
1996	536	+4.1%
2001	574	+7.1%
2006	484	−15.7%
2011	474	−2.1%
2016	470	−0.8%
2021	412	−12.3%
Source: Statistics Canada

Annual population estimates

Year	Pop.	±%
1996	566	—
1997	558	−1.4%
1998	564	+1.1%
1999	574	+1.8%
2000	566	−1.4%
2001	569	+0.5%
2002	575	+1.1%
2003	562	−2.3%
2004	522	−7.1%
2005	502	−3.8%
2006	502	+0.0%

Year	Pop.	±%
2007	507	+1.0%
2008	512	+1.0%
2009	509	−0.6%
2010	503	−1.2%
2011	488	−3.0%
2012	476	−2.5%
2013	482	+1.3%
2014	495	+2.7%
2015	508	+2.6%
2016	502	−1.2%
2017	507	+1.0%

Sources: NWT Bureau of Statistics (2001 - 2017)

In the 2021 Census of Population conducted by Statistics Canada, Fort Resolution had a population of 412 living in 167 of its 223 total private dwellings, a change of −12.3% from its 2016 population of 470. With a land area of 452.87 km^{2} (174.85 sq mi), it had a population density of 0.9/km^{2} (2.4/sq mi) in 2021.

In 2016, the majority of its population, 430, was listed as Indigenous. The majority of townspeople are of Dene (320) and Métis (105) descent. The predominant languages are English, Chipewyan and Michif.

== First Nations ==
Fort Resolution is represented by the Deninu Kųę́ First Nation and are part of the Akaitcho Territory Government.

== Gallery ==
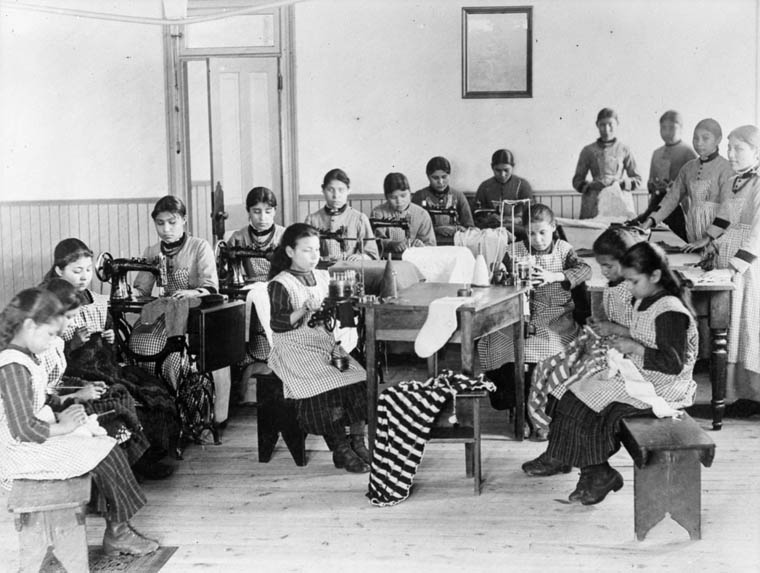
Indian Residential School

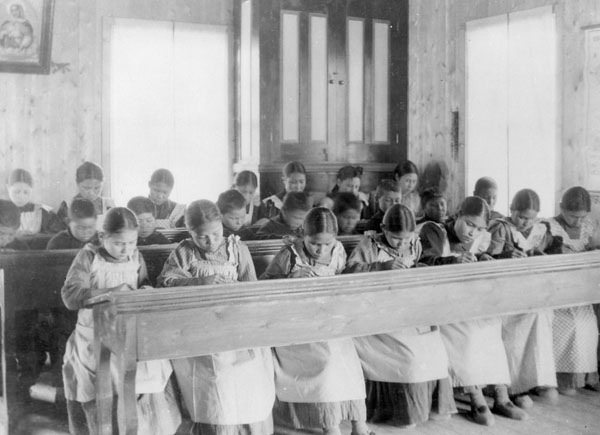
Study period at Roman Catholic Indian Residential School

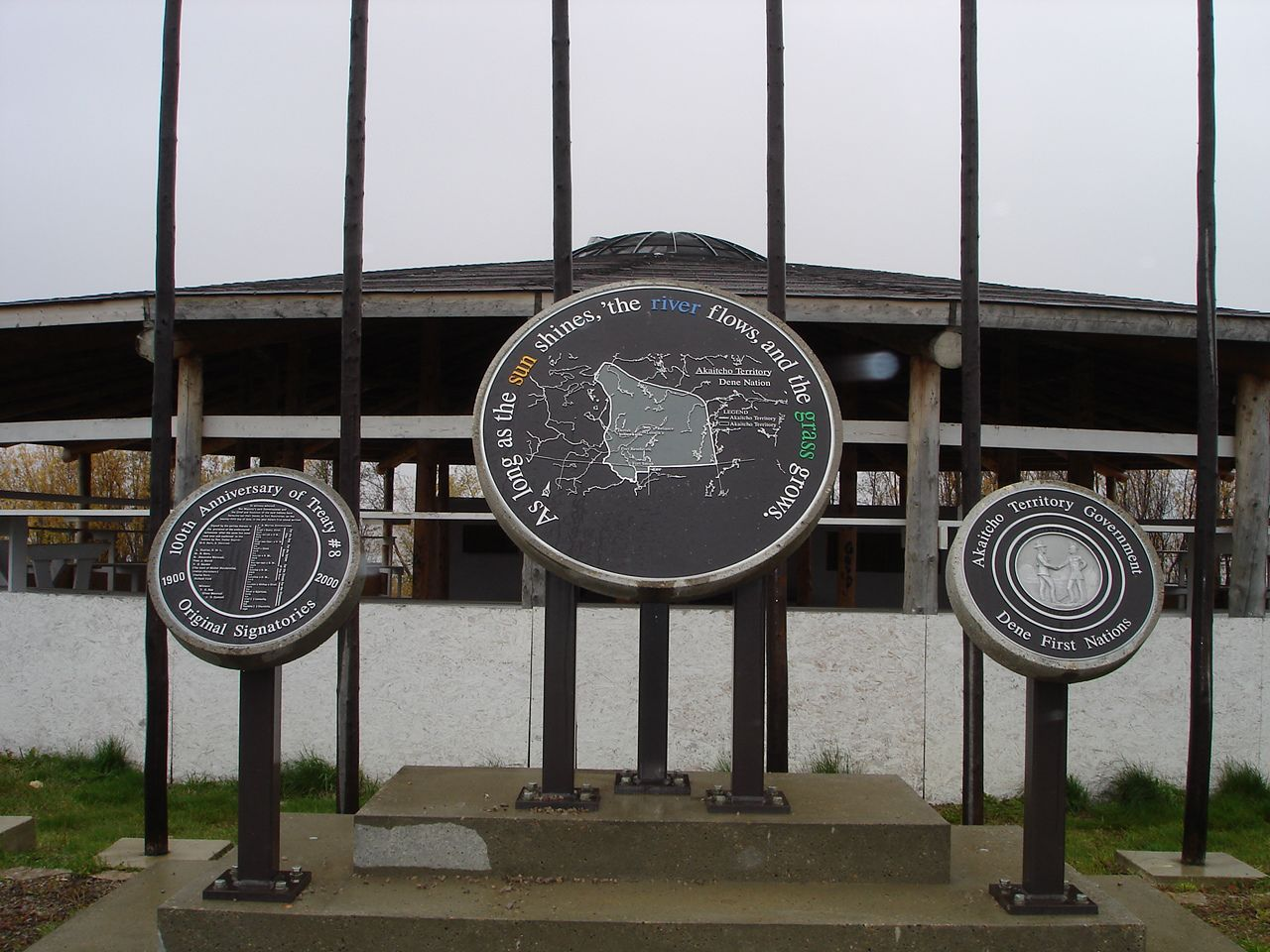
Treaty 8 site in Fort Resolution

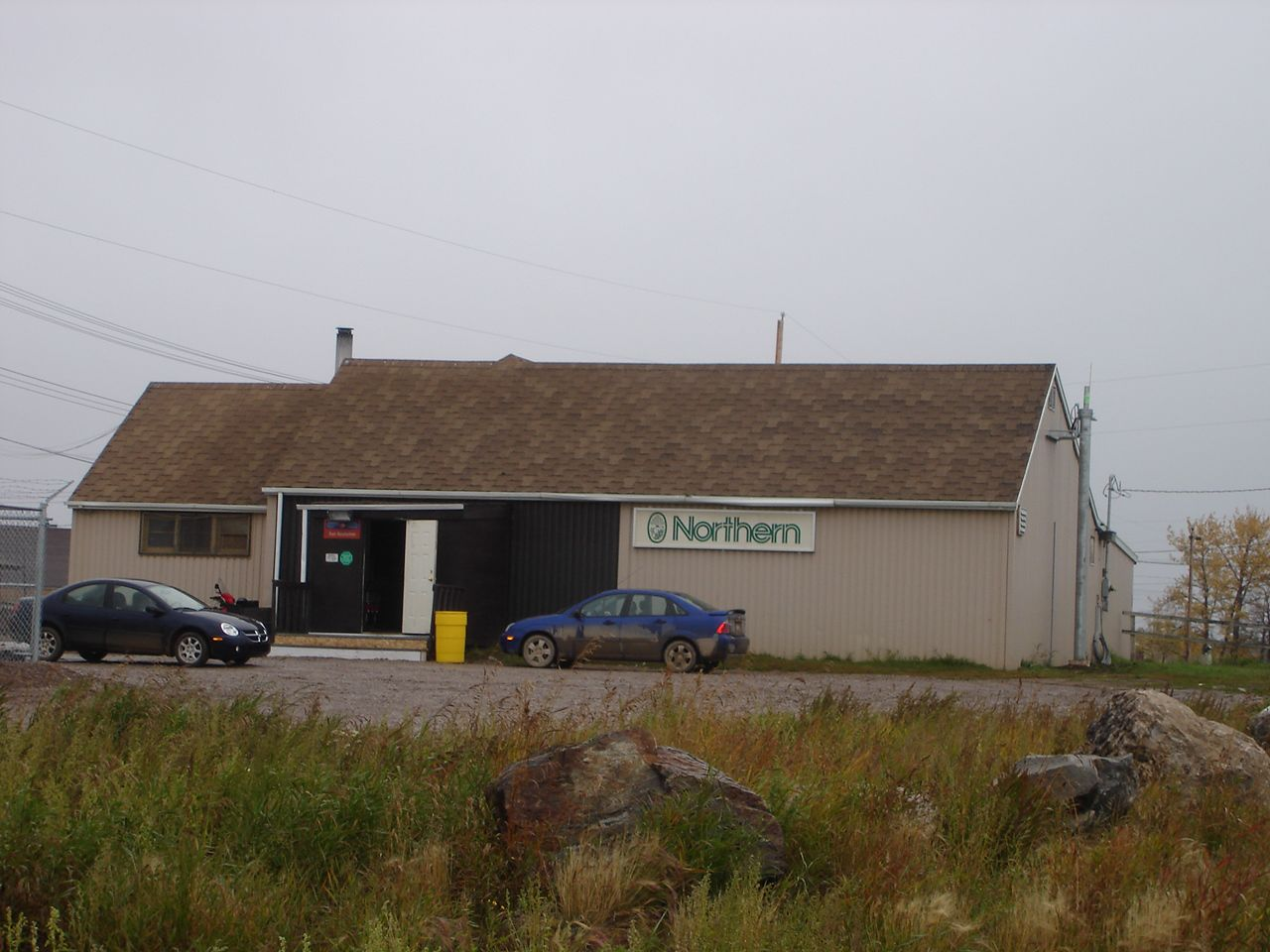
The Northern Store in Fort Resolution

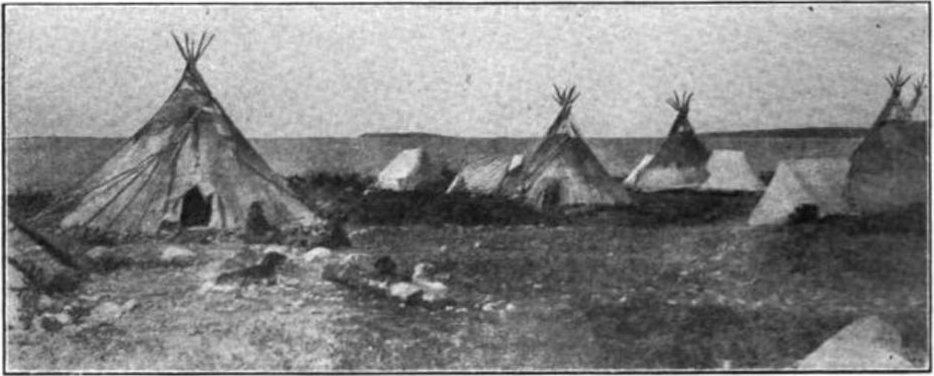
Tipis of the Tłı̨chǫ (Dogrib) First Nations on the shores of Slave Lake at Fort Resolution, circa 1907

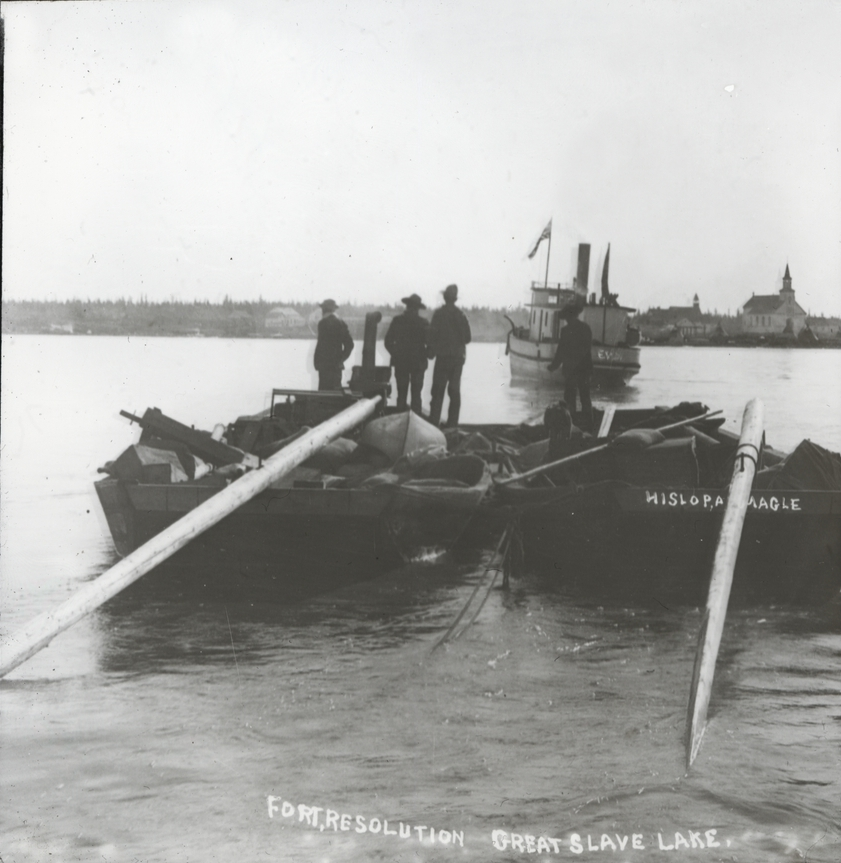
Boats on the Great Slave Lake at Fort Resolution, 1900s

== Notable people ==
David Graeme Hancock, Q.C., 15th Premier of Alberta, 23 March–15 September 2014

== Climate ==
Fort Resolution has a subarctic climate (Dfc) with short, mild summers and long, cold winters lasting from October through April.

On January 8, 1936, Fort Resolution recorded a temperature of -59.4 °C (-75 °F), which is the coldest temperature recorded in the Northwest Territories.

Climate data for Fort Resolution
Month	Jan	Feb	Mar	Apr	May	Jun	Jul	Aug	Sep	Oct	Nov	Dec	Year
Mean daily maximum °C (°F)	−25 (−13)	−20 (−4)	−14 (6)	0 (32)	10 (50)	17 (62)	21 (69)	18 (64)	11 (51)	2 (35)	−9 (15)	−17 (2)	0 (32)
Mean daily minimum °C (°F)	−31 (−23)	−27 (−16)	−24 (−11)	−11 (12)	0 (32)	5 (41)	10 (50)	9 (48)	3 (37)	−3 (26)	−15 (5)	−25 (−13)	−9 (15)
Average precipitation mm (inches)	15 (0.6)	7.6 (0.3)	13 (0.5)	10 (0.4)	25 (1.0)	30 (1.2)	28 (1.1)	36 (1.4)	36 (1.4)	28 (1.1)	33 (1.3)	15 (0.6)	280 (10.9)
Source: Weatherbase

== See also ==
- List of municipalities in the Northwest Territories
