= 101.9 FM =

FM radio frequency

The following radio stations broadcast on FM frequency 101.9 MHz:

== Argentina ==
- de La Costa in Granadero Baigorria, Santa Fe
- LRI405 Activa in Arteaga, Santa Fe
- LRM955 Maria Juana in María Juana, Santa Fe
- Radio María in Olavarría, Buenos Aires
- Radio María in Villa del Soto, Córdoba
- Radio María in Ceres, Santa Fe
- Radio Positiva in Rosario, Santa Fe

== Australia ==
- Star 101.9 in Mackay, Queensland
- 2NWR in Armidale, New South Wales
- 3FOX in Melbourne, Victoria
- 2WLF in Wagga Wagga, New South Wales
- Radio National in Roxby Downs, South Australia
- 4CEE in Maryborough, Queensland
- Snow FM in Perisher, New South Wales
- Triple J in Orange, New South Wales
- Triple J in Renmark, South Australia
- Triple J in Strahan, Tasmania

== Canada (Channel 270) ==
- CBAL-FM-1 in Neguac-Allardville, New Brunswick
- CBAX-FM-2 in St. John's, Newfoundland and Labrador
- CBJ-FM-4 in L'Anse-St-Jean, Quebec
- CBMG-FM in Cowansville, Quebec
- CBPL-FM in Kamloops, British Columbia
- CFDA-FM in Victoriaville, Quebec
- CFFB-1-FM in Cambridge Bay, Nunavut
- CFFB-2-FM in Kugluktuk, Nunavut
- CFLO-FM-1 in L'Annonciation, Quebec
- CFND-FM in St-Jerome, Quebec
- CFRC-FM in Kingston, Ontario
- CFUV-FM in Victoria, British Columbia
- CHAI-FM in Chateauguay, Quebec
- CHAI-FM-1 in Candiac, Quebec
- CHFP-FM in Fort Providence, Northwest Territories
- CHFS-FM in Fort Smith, Northwest Territories
- CHFX-FM in Halifax, Nova Scotia
- CHIP-FM in Fort-Coulonge, Quebec
- CHRK-FM in Sydney, Nova Scotia
- CHRR-FM in Hay River Reserve, Northwest Territories
- CITR-FM in Vancouver, British Columbia
- CJFW-FM-2 in Prince Rupert, British Columbia
- CJFW-FM-8 in Hazelton, British Columbia
- CJSS-FM in Cornwall, Ontario
- CKFX-FM in North Bay, Ontario
- CKKC-1-FM in Crawford Bay, British Columbia
- CKKY-FM in Wainwright, Alberta
- CKLB-FM in Yellowknife, Northwest Territories
- VF2008 in Arctic Red River, Northwest Territories
- VF2020 in Kakisa, Northwest Territories
- VF2022 in Fort Liard, Northwest Territories
- VF2025 in Wrigley, Northwest Territories
- VF2026 in Snowdrift, Northwest Territories
- VF2054 in Lac La Martre, Northwest Territories
- VF2069 in Fort Franklin, Northwest Territories
- VF2070 in Fort Good Hope, Northwest Territories
- VF2071 in Fort Rae, Northwest Territories
- VF2080 in Fort McPherson, Northwest Territories
- VF2081 in Fort Resolution, Northwest Territories
- VF2082 in Inuvik, Northwest Territories
- VF2083 in Aklavik, Northwest Territories
- VF2101 in Fort St. James, British Columbia
- VF2102 in Fort Simpson, Northwest Territories
- VF2387 in St-Ludger-de-Milot, Quebec
- VOAR-11-FM in Goose Bay, Newfoundland and Labrador

== China ==
- CNR China Traffic Radio in Yinchuan
- CRI News Radio in Chizhou (stopped airing on 15 January 2021)
- Meizhou News Radio in Meizhou

== Malaysia ==
- Johor FM in Johor Bahru, Johor and Singapore
- Nasional FM in Kota Bharu, Kelantan
- Raaga in Langkawi, Kedah

== Mexico ==
- XEAD-FM in Guadalajara, Jalisco
- XHCAM-FM in Campeche, Campeche
- XHCBJ-FM in Cancún, Quintana Roo
- XHCPAB-FM in Mazatlán, Sinaloa
- XHENU-FM in Nuevo Laredo, Tamaulipas
- XHEOF-FM in Celaya (El Puesto), Guanajuato
- XHHOS-FM in Hermosillo (La Paloma), Sonora
- XHPF-FM in Mexicali, Baja California
- XHPNA-FM in Tepic, Nayarit
- XHRIC-FM in Poza Rica, Veracruz
- XHUMI-FM in Torreón, Coahuila
- XHUQ-FM in Zihuatanejo, Guerrero

== Philippines (Channel 270) ==
- DWRR-FM in Quezon City, Metro Manila (inactive due to franchise non-renewal of ABS-CBN)
- DYFM in Cebu City
- DXFM in Davao City
- DWKP in Legazpi
- DXJP in Zamboanga

== Turkey ==
- TRT-4 at Gaziantep
- Radyo Mavi at Gebze, Istanbul, Bursa, Kocaeli, Sakarya, Tekirdağ, Çanakkale, Balıkesir, Edirne, Yalova and Bilecik

== United Kingdom ==
- Classic FM in Belfast, Northern Ireland
- Heart West in Ivybridge

== United States (Channel 270) ==
- KACQ in Lometa, Texas
- KATP in Amarillo, Texas
- KBTO in Bottineau, North Dakota
- KBUS in Paris, Texas
- KBXT in Franklin, Texas
- KCMX in Ashland, Oregon
- KCSC-LP in Mukilteo, Washington
- KFGG-LP in Marble Falls, Texas
- KFMH in Belle Fourche, South Dakota
- KHHM in Shingle Springs, California
- KHTB in Ogden, Utah
- KIGN in Burns, Wyoming
- KINK in Portland, Oregon
- KJDS in Mountain Pine, Arkansas
- KJFK-LP in Hot Springs, Montana
- KJVV in Twentynine Palms, California
- KKQY in Hill City, Kansas
- KLBN in Fresno, California
- KLWR in North Rock Springs, Wyoming
- KMVX in Monroe, Louisiana
- KMXF in Lowell, Arkansas
- KNHK-FM in Weston, Oregon
- KNWS in Waterloo, Iowa
- KOOO in La Vista, Nebraska
- KPBM-LP in Poplar Bluff, Missouri
- KPCR-LP in Santa Cruz, California
- KQBL in Emmett, Idaho
- KQES-LP in Bellevue, Washington
- KQKK in Walker, Minnesota
- KQSF in Sioux Falls, South Dakota
- KQSS in Miami, Arizona
- KQXT in San Antonio, Texas
- KRSQ in Laurel, Montana
- KRWK in Fargo, North Dakota
- KSCA in Glendale, California
- KSML-FM in Huntington, Texas
- KSMZ-LP in Missoula, Montana
- KSUG in Heber Springs, Arkansas
- KTAH-LP in Tacoma, Washington
- KTAO in Taos, New Mexico
- KTKB in Agana, Guam
- KTSL in Medical Lake, Washington
- KTST in Oklahoma City, Oklahoma
- KUCD in Pearl City, Hawaii
- KVJH-LP in Topeka, Kansas
- KVSH-LP in Vashon, Washington
- KWFR in San Angelo, Texas
- KWID in Las Vegas, Nevada
- KWNW in Crawfordsville, Arkansas
- KXWA in Centennial, Colorado
- KXZI-LP in Kalispell, Montana
- KYAD-LP in Bakersfield, California
- KZWV in Eldon, Missouri
- KZZQ (FM) in Richardton, North Dakota
- WARU in Roann, Indiana
- WATB-LP in Atlanta, Georgia
- WAVT in Pottsville, Pennsylvania
- WAZX in Cleveland, Georgia
- WBAV in Gastonia, North Carolina
- WBGE in Bainbridge, Georgia
- WCIB in Falmouth, Massachusetts
- WCOQ in Alfred, New York
- WDET in Detroit, Michigan
- WDEZ in Wausau, Wisconsin
- WDXD-LP in Tallahassee, Florida
- WEKV in Central City, Kentucky
- WFAN-FM in New York, New York
- WFTA in Fulton, Mississippi
- WHHY in Montgomery, Alabama
- WHTE in Ruckersville, Virginia
- WHUG in Jamestown, New York
- WIKS in New Bern, North Carolina
- WJFL in Tennille, Georgia
- WJHM in Daytona Beach, Florida
- WJIV in Cherry Valley, New York
- WJVR in Iron Gate, Virginia
- WKFC in North Corbin, Kentucky
- WKKN in Westminster, Vermont
- WKLU in Brownsburg, Indiana
- WKQS in Negaunee, Michigan
- WKRP-LP in Raleigh, North Carolina
- WKRQ in Cincinnati, Ohio
- WKSK in South Hill, Virginia
- WLDR in Traverse City, Michigan
- WLFZ in Springfield, Illinois
- WLIF in Baltimore, Maryland
- WLMG in New Orleans, Louisiana
- WOCE in Ringgold, Georgia
- WOCT-LP in Oshkosh, Wisconsin
- WOIB-LP in Oakland Park, Florida
- WOMP-LP in Cambridge, Ohio
- WOZI in Presque Isle, Maine
- WPHX-LP in Ruskin, Florida
- WPNG in Pearson, Georgia
- WPOR in Portland, Maine
- WQJJ-LP in Jasper, Alabama
- WRFP-LP in Eau Claire, Wisconsin
- WSDX-LP in Brandon, Florida
- WTMX in Skokie, Illinois
- WVAQ in Morgantown, West Virginia
- WVLQ in Port St. Joe, Florida
- WVOW in Logan, West Virginia
- WWGR in Fort Myers, Florida
- WYLR in Hubbard, Ohio
- WZAR in Ponce, Puerto Rico
