= List of radio stations in the Northwest Territories =

The following is a list of radio stations in the Canadian territory of Northwest Territories, as of 2024.

Call sign	Frequency	City of Licence	Owner	Format
CBAK	*1210 AM	Aklavik	CBC Radio One	public news/talk Moving to 97.7 FM CRTC approved
VF2083	101.9 FM	Aklavik	Native Communications Society of the Northwest Territories	First Nations community radio
VF2145	106.1 FM	Arctic Red River	Arctic Red River Settlement Corporation	
VF2071	101.9 FM	Behchoko	Native Communications Society of the Northwest Territories	First Nations community radio
CBQB-FM	105.1 FM	Behchoko	CBC Radio One	public news/talk
VF2069	101.9 FM	Deline	Native Communications Society of the Northwest Territories	First Nations community radio
CBQO-FM	105.1 FM	Deline	CBC Radio One	public news/talk
VF2388	98.7 FM	Ekati Mine Site	BHP Billiton Diamonds	Mining info
VF2070	101.9 FM	Fort Good Hope	Native Communications Society of the Northwest Territories	First Nations community radio
CBQE-FM	105.1 FM	Fort Good Hope	CBC Radio One	public news/talk
CIAM-FM-30	95.1 FM	Fort Liard	CARE Radio Broadcasting Association	Christian radio
VF2022	101.9 FM	Fort Liard	Native Communications Society of the Northwest Territories	First Nations community radio
CHFL-FM	107.1 FM	Fort Liard	Fort Liard Communications Society	community radio
CBAH-FM	99.9 FM	Fort McPherson	CBC Radio One	public news/talk
VF2080	101.9 FM	Fort McPherson	Native Communications Society of the Northwest Territories	First Nations community radio
CBAU-FM	98.9 FM	Fort Providence	CBC Radio One	public news/talk
CHFP-FM	101.9 FM	Fort Providence	Native Communications Society of the Northwest Territories	First Nations community radio
VF2081	101.9 FM	Fort Resolution	Native Communications Society of the Northwest Territories	First Nations community radio
CBQD-FM	105.1 FM	Fort Resolution	CBC Radio One	public news/talk
VF2102	101.9 FM	Fort Simpson	Native Communications Society of the Northwest Territories	First Nations community radio
CBDY-FM	107.5 FM	Fort Simpson	CBC Radio One	public news/talk
CFYK-FM-1	97.9 FM	Fort Smith	CBC Radio One	public news/talk
CHFS-FM	101.9 FM	Fort Smith	Native Communications Society of the Northwest Territories	First Nations community radio
VF2034	106.1 FM	Gameti	CBC Radio One	public news/talk
CBDJ-FM	93.7 FM	Hay River	CBC Radio One	public news/talk
CJCD-FM-1	100.1 FM	Hay River	Vista Broadcast Group	Adult Contemporary/Classic Hits
CHRR-FM	101.9 FM	Hay River	Native Communications Society of the Northwest Territories	First Nations community radio
CKHR-FM	107.3 FM	Hay River	Hay River Community Service Society	community radio
CHAK	860 AM	Inuvik	CBC Radio One	public news/talk
VF2533	92.7 FM	Inuvik	Inuvik Seventh Day Adventist Church	Christian radio
CKRW-FM-2	98.7 FM	Inuvik	Klondike Broadcasting	hot adult contemporary
VF2082	101.9 FM	Inuvik	Native Communications Society of the Northwest Territories	First Nations community radio
VF2020	101.9 FM	Kakisa	Native Communications Society of the Northwest Territories	First Nations community radio
VF2021	107.1 FM	Kakisa	CBC Radio One	public news/talk
VF2026	101.9 FM	Lutselk'e	Native Communications Society of the Northwest Territories	First Nations community radio
VF2278	105.1 FM	Lutselk'e	CBC Radio One	public news/talk
CBDW	990 AM	Norman Wells	CBC Radio One	public news/talk
VF2037	106.1 FM	Paulatuk	CBC Radio One	public news/talk
VF2417	107.1 FM	Paulatuk		
VF2045	107.1 FM	Sachs Harbour	CBC Radio One	public news/talk
VF2498	90.5 FM	Tsiigehtchic	Northern Native Broadcasting, Yukon	First Nations community radio
CHTC-FM	99.9 FM	Tsiigehtchic		
VF2008	101.9 FM	Tsiigehtchic	Native Communications Society of the Northwest Territories	First Nations community radio
CBQB-FM	105.1 FM	Tsiigehtchic	CBC Radio One	public news/talk
CBAC	99.9 FM	Tuktoyaktuk	CBC Radio One	public news/talk
CBXY-FM	100.9 FM	Tulita	CBC Radio One	public news/talk
CKHI-FM	105.1 FM	Ulukhaktok	CBC Radio One	public news/talk
VF2054	101.9 FM	Whatì	Native Communications Society of the Northwest Territories	First Nations community radio
CBQG	1280 AM	Wrigley	CBC Radio One	public news/talk
VF2025	101.9 FM	Wrigley	Native Communications Society of the Northwest Territories	First Nations community radio
CBNY-FM	95.3 FM	Yellowknife	CBC Music	public music
VF2136	97.3 FM	Yellowknife	L'Association Franco-Culturelle de Yellowknife	public news/talk (French)
CFYK-FM	98.9 FM	Yellowknife	CBC Radio One	public news/talk
CJCD-FM	100.1 FM	Yellowknife	Vista Broadcast Group	Adult Contemporary/Classic Hits
CKLB-FM	101.9 FM	Yellowknife	Native Communications Society of the Northwest Territories	First Nations community radio
CIVR-FM	103.5 FM	Yellowknife	Société Radio Taïga	community radio (French)

== See also ==
- Lists of radio stations in North and Central America
