= Pine Point, Northwest Territories =

Pine Point
- Abandoned locality/former town
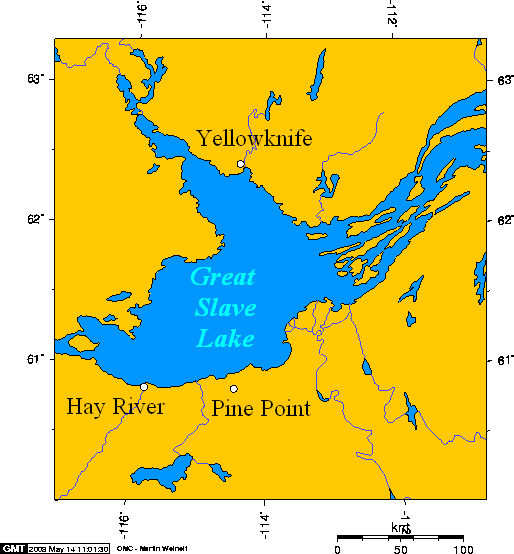
- Pine Point, Northwest Territories, Canada

- Location within Northwest Territories Location within Canada
- Coordinates: 60°50′0″N 114°28′5″W
- Country: Canada
- Territory: Northwest Territories
- Region: South Slave Region
- Census division: Region 5
- Constructed: 1962
- Incorporated (town): April 1, 1974
- Dissolved: January 1, 1996

Government
  - Type: Unincorporated (previously mayor-council government)
  - Final mayor: Michael Lenton
- Time zone: UTC−06:00 (Northwest Territories Time)

Pine Point is an abandoned locality that formerly held town status near the south shore of Great Slave Lake between the towns of Hay River and Fort Resolution in the Northwest Territories of Canada. It was built to serve the work force at the Pine Point Mine, an open-pit mine that produced lead and zinc ores. The town's population peaked at 1,915 in 1976, but was abandoned and deconstructed in 1988 after the mine closed in 1987.

== History ==
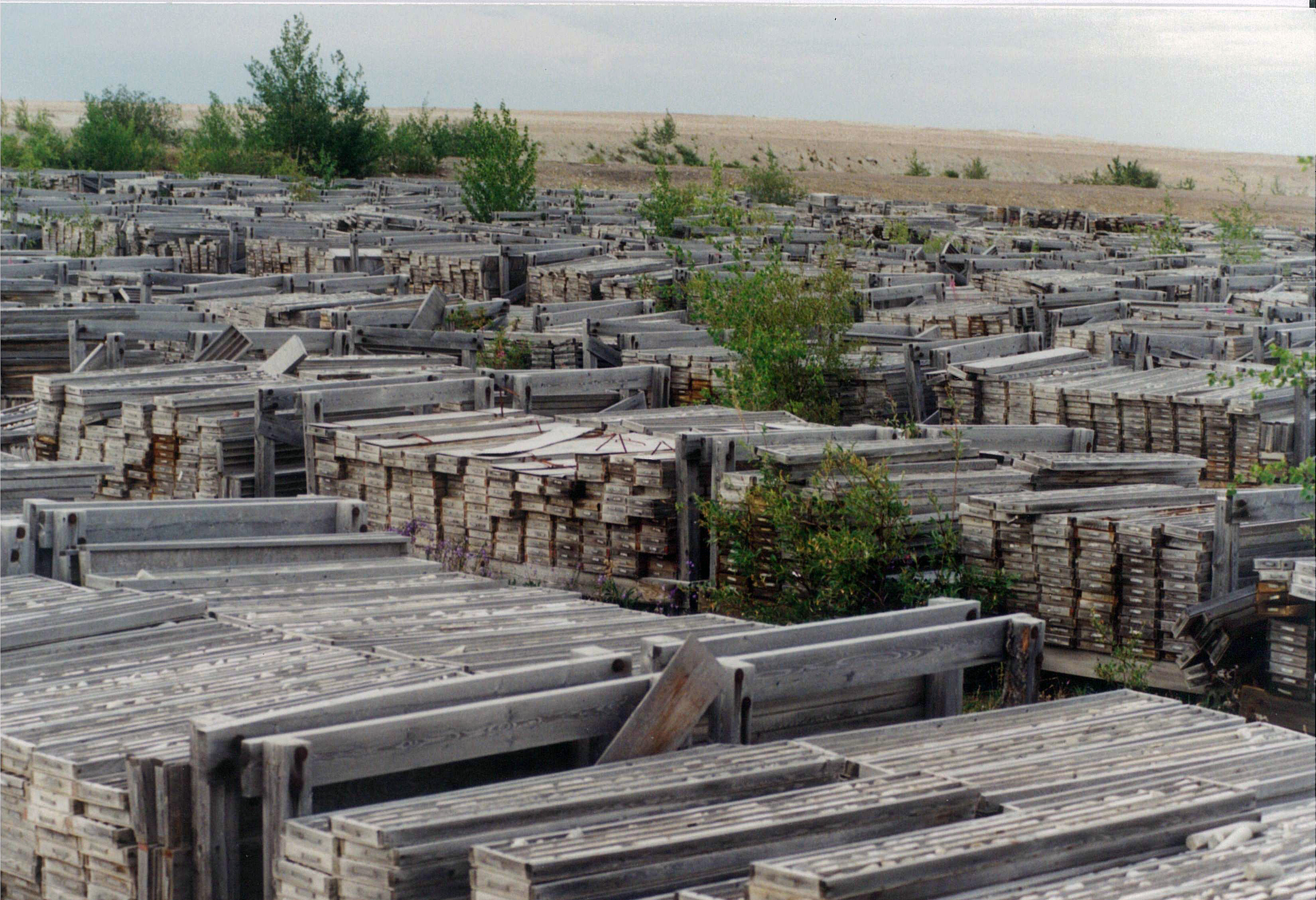
A huge laydown of drillcore from 25 years of exploration work that defined 50 lead-zinc deposits at Pine Point.

Construction of both the Pine Point mine and the community commenced in 1962. Pine Point incorporated as a town on April 1, 1974.

The mine was closed in 1987, forcing the single-industry town to close in 1988. Mike Lenton was the town's last mayor. Pine Point houses were sold cheaply, and many of the buildings were then moved to Fort Resolution (including the ice arena), Hay River and northern Alberta while the remaining buildings were demolished. The Town of Pine Point was absorbed into Unorganized Fort Smith on January 1, 1996. Today the site is completely abandoned, although there is still evidence of the street layout.

Pine Point is the subject of Welcome to Pine Point, a 2011 web documentary created by Michael Simons and Paul Shoebridge and produced by the National Film Board of Canada. The web documentary includes audiovisual material and mementos compiled by former resident Richard Cloutier for his own website, Pine Point Revisited.

== Demographics ==
Federal census population history of Pine Point
Year	Pop.	±%
1961	1	—
1966	459	+45800.0%
1971	1,225	+166.9%
1976	1,915	+56.3%
1981	1,861	−2.8%
1986	1,558	−16.3%
1991	9	−99.4%
Source: Statistics Canada

As an unincorporated place, Pine Point's population was first recorded by Statistics Canada as 459 in 1966, an increase from a 1961 population of only 1. It then grew to a population of 1,225 in the 1971 census. By 1976, Pine Point held town status and reached a peak population of 1,915. The town's population slightly declined to 1,861 by 1981 and then declined further to 1,558 by 1986. The population exodus that followed closure of the mine left a population of only 9 in 1991.

== Education ==
Pine Point had two schools – Galena Heights Elementary School (grades K-6) and Matonabbee School (grades 7-12). Matonabbee School burned down on February 1, 1980, after which was replaced by a new building in the same location. The last graduating class was in 1988 after the mine's closure.

== Places of worship ==
- Anglican Church, the name of which is not known
- Catholic Church, St. John the Baptist
- Pine Point Pentecostal Church

== Transportation ==
Pine Point was along the Fort Resolution Highway, and the Mackenzie Northern Railway, which was owned by the Canadian National Railway. Ore concentrates from the mine were moved south by the railroad. The town also had a small airport.

== Notable people ==
- Everett Klippert, last Canadian sent to jail for being gay
- Geoff Sanderson, professional ice hockey player
