= Rosh Pinah Zinc =

Namibian mining company

logo

Rosh Pinah Zinc is a Namibian mining company registered in the ǁKharas Region and based at Rosh Pinah in the south of Namibia. Its main asset is the Rosh Pinah mine, an underground zinc–lead–silver mine about 800 kilometres south of Windhoek. The mine has been in operation since 1969.

The company has had several owners. In 2011, it was acquired by South African mining group Exxaro, which subsequently sold its interest to Glencore. In 2017, Glencore sold its interest in the mine to the Canadian mining company Trevali Mining. In June 2023, ownership of the mine was transferred to funds advised by Appian Capital Advisory. The company is currently completing the expansion of the mine under the Rosh Pinah 2.0 (RP2.0) project.

== History ==
The Rosh Pinah mine has been in operation since 1969. The company adopted the name Rosh Pinah Zinc Corporation in February 1999.

Until 2011, its largest shareholder was Exxaro Base Metals and Industrial Holdings, a subsidiary of the South African mining group Exxaro, which held a 50.04% stake. PE Minerals (Namibia) and Jaguar Investments Four held a combined 30.04%, while an employee trust held 19.92%. In 2009, Exxaro announced plans to withdraw from the zinc business.

In December 2011 Glencore agreed to acquire an 80.08% stake in Rosh Pinah Zinc Corporation from the three shareholders for an undisclosed amount. In September 2017, Glencore sold the stake to Trevali Mining, together with a 39% interest in the Gergarub project and the Perkoa mine in Burkina Faso. The transaction was valued at US$417.8 million in cash and Trevali shares.

In April 2022, eight workers were killed when Trevali's Perkoa zinc mine in Burkina Faso was flooded, and mining and milling there were suspended. The loss of the operation, the funding that a restart would have required and political instability in Burkina Faso led to a deterioration in Trevali's liquidity and to an event of default under its credit facility, and on 19 August 2022 the company obtained an initial order for protection under Canada's Companies' Creditors Arrangement Act. Trevali's Burkina Faso subsidiary was placed in judicial liquidation, and a court-supervised sale of its remaining assets followed. In December 2022, the Supreme Court of British Columbia approved the sale of Trevali's interest in the Namibian operations. The transaction was completed on 27 June 2023, when funds advised by Appian Capital Advisory acquired Trevali's shares in GLCR Limited and assumed related capital loans.

The existing management team and approximately 450 employees remained with the company. In December 2023, the company introduced a new corporate identity.

== Corporate structure and ownership ==
Rosh Pinah Zinc Corporation is a Namibian proprietary limited company headquartered in Rosh Pinah in the ǁKharas Region. Its activities include the mining and concentration of zinc and lead.

A controlling interest in the company was acquired in 2023 by funds advised by Appian Capital Advisory through GLCR Limited. Appian provides technical and management support to the company.

In September 2025, Appian sold a silver stream over the Rosh Pinah mine — 90% of payable silver, falling to 45% after 3.1 million ounces — to Versamet Royalties Corporation as part of a US$125 million transaction that also included a royalty on the Santa Rita mine in Brazil.

== Rosh Pinah mine ==
The company's mine is an underground mining operation producing zinc and lead sulphide concentrates, with smaller quantities of copper, silver and gold. The ore bodies occur within the Rosh Pinah Formation of the Neoproterozoic Gariep Belt and are classified as sedimentary-exhalative mineralisation.

Ore is extracted using long-hole open stoping and processed in a crushing, milling and flotation plant. The processing plant historically had a capacity of about 0.7 million tonnes of ore per year. Electricity is supplied from the NamPower grid, while fresh water is sourced from the Orange River. As of June 2020 recoverable reserves were estimated at 11.23 million tonnes, grading 6.3% zinc, 1.3% lead and 19 grams per tonne of silver.

In 2025, the company produced 618,000 tonnes of ore with an average zinc grade of 6.18%, containing 33,323 tonnes of zinc and 4,400 tonnes of lead, below the planned 654,000 tonnes, in a year in which the RP2.0 expansion works were under construction. Exploration drilling totalled about 21,000 metres in 2025 and added approximately 1.5 million tonnes to the mineral resource. The company planned about 46,000 metres of drilling for 2026 and approximately 80,000 metres by the end of 2027.

== Rosh Pinah 2.0 expansion ==
Rosh Pinah 2.0 (RP2.0) is an expansion project at the Rosh Pinah mine. The project includes underground development, a new mine portal and decline, a paste backfill system and modifications to the processing plant. The expansion was designed to increase ore-processing capacity from approximately 700,000 tonnes to at least 1.3 million tonnes per year and increase zinc-equivalent production to about 170 million pounds annually.

Trevali Mining had previously estimated the cost of a similar expansion at approximately US$111 million before suspending the project. In September 2025, Rosh Pinah Zinc obtained a US$150 million debt facility, equivalent to about N$2.6 billion, underwritten by Standard Bank. At that time, construction of the expansion was reported to be more than 80% complete.

A paste backfill plant was commissioned in February 2026. The plant is used to fill mined-out stopes and reduce the amount of tailings deposited at the surface. A water treatment plant was commissioned in May 2026 to recycle process water and reduce the mine's use of water from the Orange River.

At the end of June 2026, the company commissioned a semi-autogenous grinding (SAG) mill, replacing the existing ball mill. It was the final major processing component of the expansion. Construction was reported to be more than 95% complete, with processing capacity expected to reach 1.4 million tonnes per year after the ramp-up period.

== Other interests ==
The company holds a 49% interest in Gergarub Exploration and Mining, a joint venture with Skorpion Zinc, a subsidiary of Vedanta Zinc International, which holds the remaining 51%. The Gergarub zinc–lead–silver deposit is located about 15 kilometres north-west of Rosh Pinah. A 2022 study estimated reserves of 10.1 million tonnes and a potential mine life of 12 to 15 years. An environmental and social impact assessment for the project was submitted for public review in 2025.

In February 2025, Appian agreed to acquire a majority shareholding in the Rosh Pinah Solar Park from Emesco Energy. Under the agreement, the solar park was to be expanded from 5.4 MWp to 16.3 MWp as part of a 15-year electricity supply agreement. The project was expected to supply about 30% of the electricity required for the RP2.0 expansion.

== Environment, health and safety ==
Rosh Pinah Zinc's mining and concentration operations are certified to ISO 14001 (environmental management) and ISO 45001 (occupational health and safety). Measures introduced under RP2.0 include a paste backfill plant, which returns part of the tailings underground, and a water treatment plant that recycles process water.

=== Lead exposure and management ===
Rosh Pinah has been a lead and zinc mining centre since 1969, and lead exposure among residents has been documented; according to the manager of the town's Sidadi clinic, it arises both from mining operations and from the naturally lead-rich environment around the town. Blood lead testing carried out by the company in 2020 was reported publicly in July 2023, when The Namibian reported that 18 of 30 children tested had lead detected in their blood; the minister of mines and energy, Tom Alweendo, confirmed the exposure in October 2023 and rejected claims that the findings had been concealed.

The company was providing medical support, including prescribed medicines, to all affected individuals and added lead to its environmental management plan as a community risk. Measures reported since then include fencing off the area identified as the main source of exposure, capping the tailings storage facility with a biodegradable binding compound, dust-suppression systems, awareness campaigns in local schools and monthly monitoring of employees' families; more than 100 families relocated from the Beth-El township during rehabilitation of the area returned to their homes after clearance from the Ministry of Health. The Sidadi clinic tests residents regularly and reports results weekly to the Ministry of Health and Social Services; in 2025 its general manager described the situation as "definitely an improvement".

== Workforce and community ==
Rosh Pinah Zinc employed about 450 people at the time of the 2023 change of ownership. By 2025 the company reported more than 1,800 staff and contractors across its operations, including about 600 working on the RP2.0 project, and stated that 99% of its full-time employees are Namibian nationals.

The company runs the Obib Training Centre, which provides vocational training and skills development for residents of the surrounding communities. It provides two annual bursaries at the University of Namibia, including one reserved for a student from the ǁKharas Region. It reported community-related expenditure of N$6.8 million in 2025.

== See also ==
- Rosh Pinah mine
- Skorpion Zinc
- Mining in Namibia
- Zinc mining
- Lead mining
