= Rocky Simpson =

Rocky Simpson may refer to:

- Rocky "R. J." Simpson Jr., a Canadian politician who has served in the Legislative Assembly of the Northwest Territories since 2015,
- Rocky Simpson Sr., his father, who has served in the Legislative Assembly of the Northwest Territories since 2019.
