= Vince McKay =

Canadian politician

Vince McKay MLA

Member of the Legislative Assembly of the Northwest Territories
- Incumbent
- Assumed office November 14, 2023
- Preceded by: Rocky Simpson Sr.
- Constituency: Hay River South

Member of the Executive Council of the Northwest Territories
- Incumbent
- Assumed office December 12, 2023

Personal details
- Born: September 17, 1977 (age 48) Hay River, Northwest Territories
- Party: non-partisan consensus government

Vince McKay (born September 17, 1977) is a Canadian politician, who was elected to the Legislative Assembly of the Northwest Territories in the 2023 election. He represents the electoral district of Hay River South.

He previously served as the municipal council in Hay River.

== Election results ==
2023 Northwest Territories general election: Hay River South
Candidate	Votes	%
Vince McKay	282	38.63
Wally Schumann	238	32.60
Rocky Simpson Sr. (I)	210	28.77
Total votes	730	
