= Mackenzie Northern Railway =

Railway in Canada

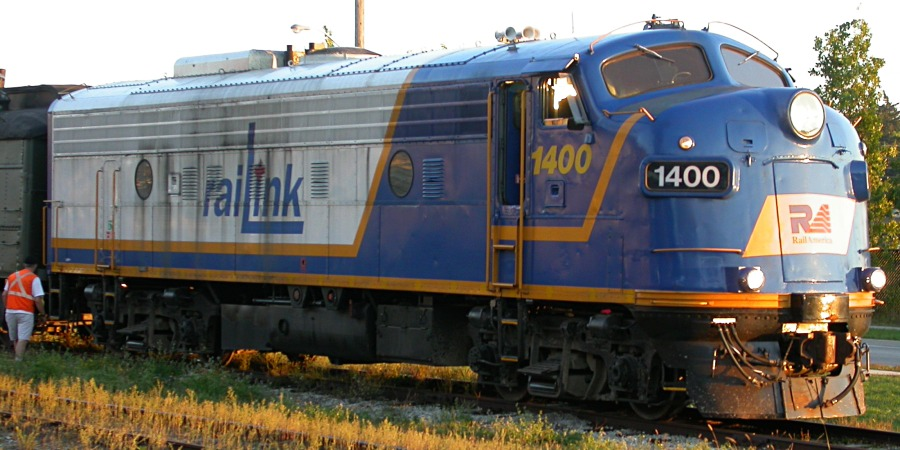
- RailLink Canada 1400, an EMD FP9Au at Waterloo, Ontario, October 7, 2003.

Overview
- Headquarters: Peace River, Alberta
- Reporting mark: RLGN
- Locale: Alberta, Northwest Territories
- Dates of operation: 1964–

Technical
- Track gauge: 4 ft 8 1/2 in (1,435 mm) standard gauge

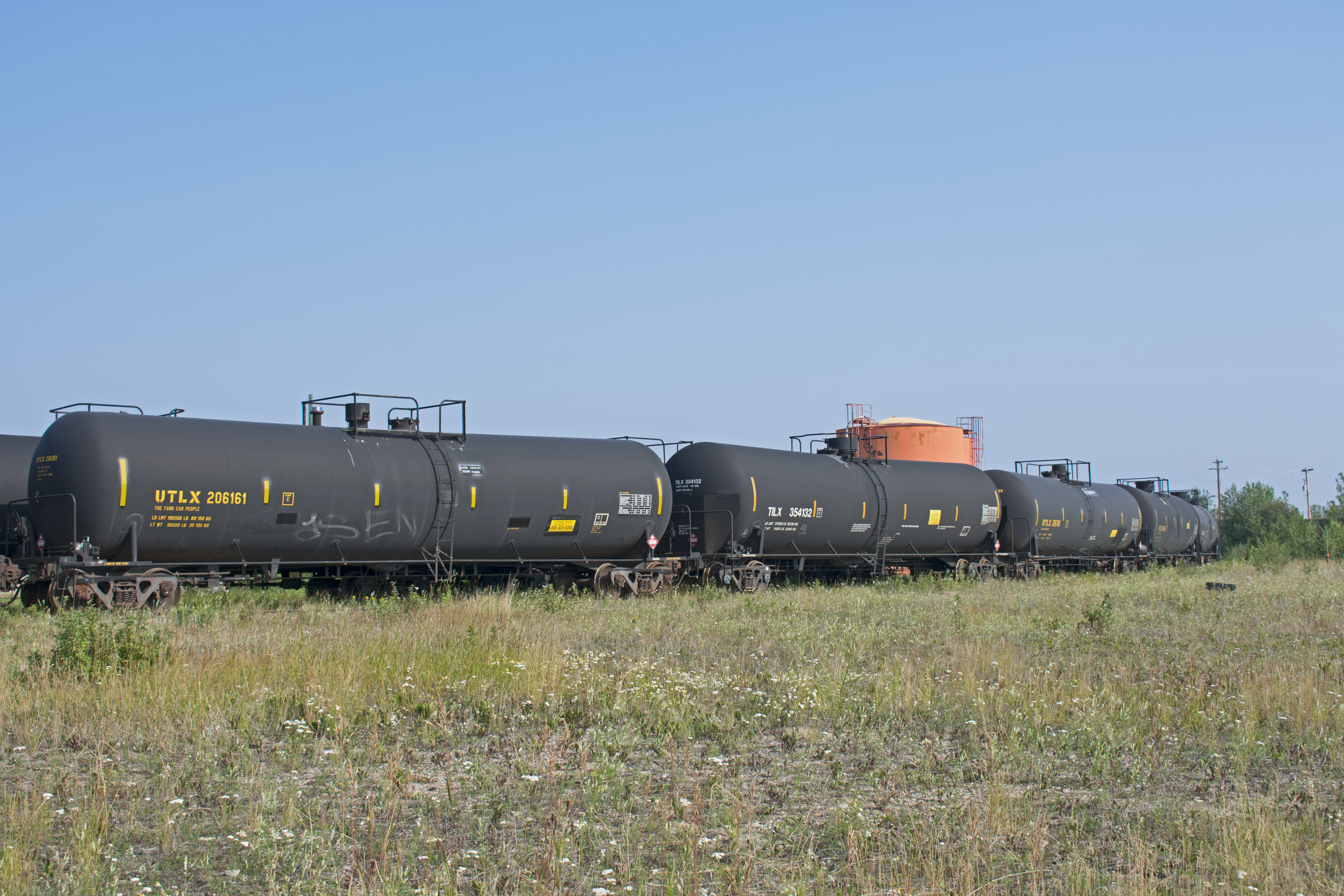
The northern end of the railway in Hay River

The Mackenzie Northern Railway (reporting mark RLGN) is a 602-mile (969 km) Canadian railway operating in Alberta and the Northwest Territories. It is the northernmost trackage of the contiguous North American railway network. Since being purchased by CN in 2006, the railway's mainline consists of the Slave Lake (Smith, AB - Winagami, AB), Peace River (Winagami - Roma Jct., AB), Manning (Roma Jct., - High Level, AB), and the Meander River (High Level, AB - Hay River, NT) subdivisions.

== History ==
The majority of the tracks which the Mackenzie Northern Railway uses were built by the federal government as the Great Slave Lake Railway, running from a point on the Northern Alberta Railways (NAR) at Grimshaw, Alberta, to the southern shores of Great Slave Lake at Hay River, Northwest Territories. The undertaking started in 1961 with a proposal to Parliament, and the line opened in 1964. This railroad was part of John Diefenbaker's vision for the north, and facilitated shipment of lead-zinc ore from the Pine Point Mine.

The Great Slave Railway's operation was entrusted to Canadian National Railway in 1966, which had been operating the line on behalf of the federal government since it opened. A spur line continued east from Hay River along the south shore of Great Slave Lake to the mine at Pine Point. This section was abandoned in 1988 after the mine closed and ore concentrate shipments ceased. The total mileage in the Northwest Territories from the border with Alberta to Hay River is approximately 130 kilometres (80 mi).

The NAR had been jointly owned by CN and Canadian Pacific Railway (CP) since 1928. In 1981, CN purchased the other half of the NAR from CP, allowing CN to operate continuously from Edmonton to Hay River.

== Sale to RailLink Canada ==
Between November 1997 and May 1998 CN sold its lines running from Smith, Alberta, on the former NAR (north of Edmonton) to Peace River and Grimshaw and on to Hay River to a shortline operator, RailLink Canada. RailLink Canada consolidated these lines under the name Mackenzie Northern Railway.

RailLink Canada was subsequently purchased by RailAmerica, which operated the Mackenzie Northern Railway between Smith and Hay River. Commodities include agriculture and forest products from northeastern Alberta and the southern Northwest Territories, as well as fuel and supplies destined for Arctic communities to be barged across Great Slave Lake and down the Mackenzie River to the Beaufort Sea.

== CN buys lines back ==
On January 19, 2006, CN announced the purchase from RailAmerica Inc. of the Mackenzie Northern Railway, the Lakeland & Waterways Railway, and the Central Western Railway (jointly known as RLGN/CWRL).

CN came full circle by paying $26 million for the three northern Alberta rail lines it had sold nine years previously.
