= Osisko Metals =

Canadian mining company

Osisko Metals Incorporated
- Company type: Public
- Traded as: TSX-V: OM
- Industry: Mining
- Founded: May 10, 2000; 26 years ago
- Headquarters: Montreal, Quebec, Canada
- Key people: John Burzynski (Executive Chairman); Robert Wares (CEO); Blair Zaritsky (CFO)
- Website: osiskometals.com

Osisko Metals Incorporated (French: Métaux Osisko Incorporée) is a Canadian mining corporation. It currently holds two historical past-producing mines — the Pine Point Mine in the Northwest Territories and the Gaspé Copper mine in Quebec — with the intent to turn them into operating mines.

== History ==
Osisko Metals was founded on May 10, 2000. Previously known as Bowmore Exploration Ltd., it renamed itself to its present name in 2017 after a 1-3 reverse stock split.

On December 16, 2017, Osisko Metals announced it would acquire the Pine Point Mine project, via a $34 Million takeover of Pine Point Mining Ltd. The deal was completed on February 23 of the following year. A mineral resources estimate report in 2019, estimated that Osisko Metals could extract 5.3 billion pounds of zinc and 2.1 billion pounds of lead from the Pine Point mine. The then-CEO, Jeff Hussey, estimated that the mine could be built by 2023, provided that there were no major geopolitical scenarios that could disrupt the zinc market. However, work was delayed due to the COVID-19 pandemic. In 2023, Osisko Metals signed a $100 Million agreement with Appian Capital Advisory, a British private equity firm, to form a joint venture for the Pine Point project. Appian received a 60% interest in the joint venture. In February 2024, Osisko Metals would sell another 5% stake in the joint venture to Appian for $8.33 million, increasing Appian's share in the joint venture from 60% to 65%. The joint venture is aiming to have the mine start construction by 2028, with production starting in 2030.

In March 2022, Osisko Metals purchased the rights for exploration and drilling on the site of the past-producing Gaspé Copper mine, owned by Glencore. Osisko was given the option to decide whether it wanted to acquire the property by the end of June 2022 after an evaluation. However, the date on the decision to acquire the mine was pushed back from June 30 to July 8, 2022. On July 8, 2022, Osisko Metals made the decision to acquire the Gaspé Copper mine from Glencore. The acquisition was completed the following year in July 2023. In February 2024, it formed a committee with figuring out a plan to dewater the open pit of the former mine.

== Current properties ==
- Pine Point Mine
- Gaspé Copper mine
