= Pine Point Mine =

Mine in Northwest Territories, Canada

- Location in Canada
- Location: Great Slave Lake, Northwest Territories, Canada; 60°52′13″N 114°27′21″W
- Products: Lead, Zinc
- Opened: 1965
- Closed: 1988
- Company: Appian Natural Resources Fund III LP (65%), Osisko Metals (35%)
- Website: pinepointmining.com/pine-point-project/

The Pine Point Mine is located on the south shore of Great Slave Lake between Hay River to the west and Fort Resolution to the east, in the Northwest Territories of Canada. It produced lead and zinc ores from a Mississippi Valley Type deposit between 1964 and 1988. Most of the mining was done by open-pit methods. The town of Pine Point was built by the mining company, Cominco, and when the mine closed the town was abandoned and demolished.

== History ==
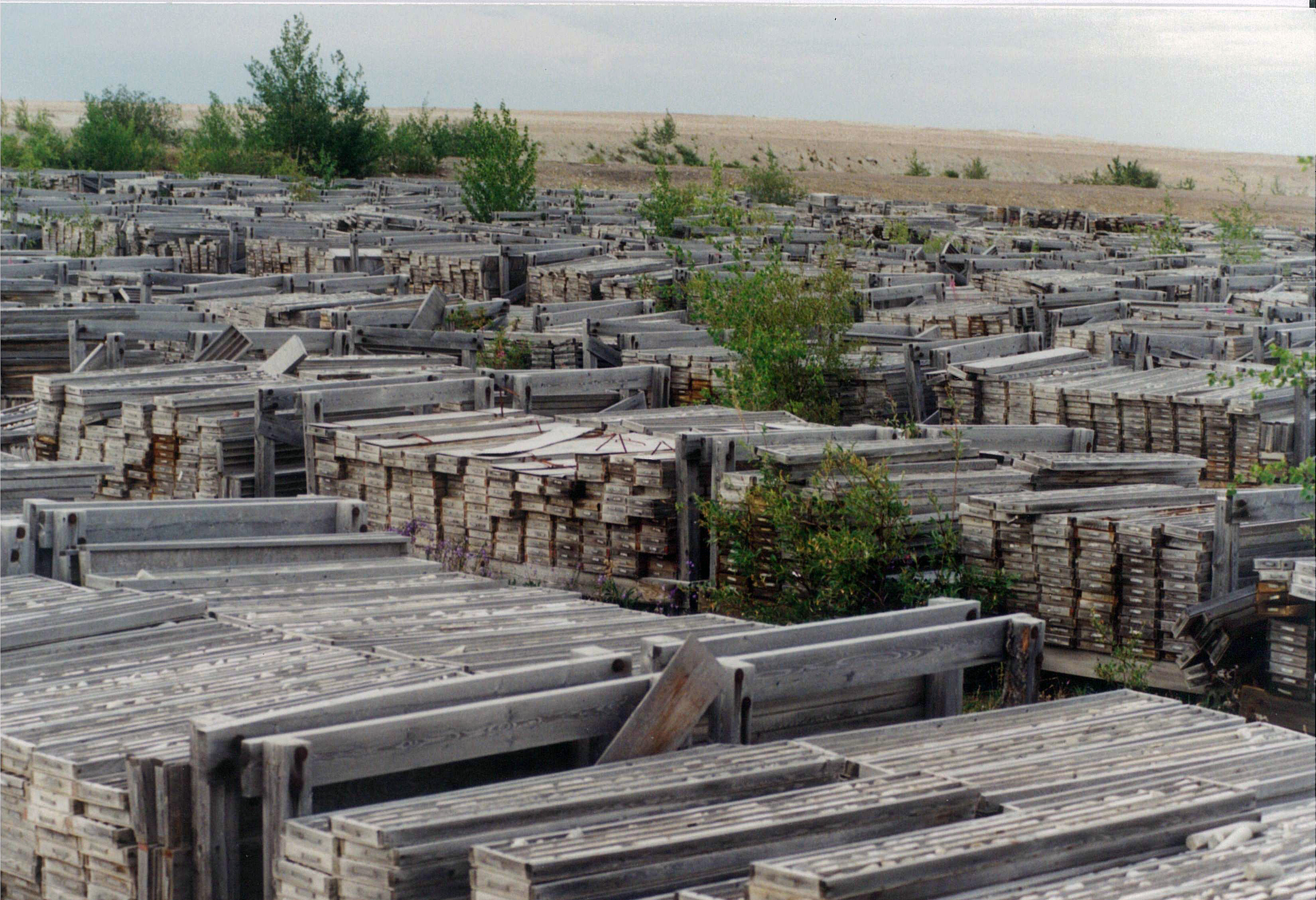
Acres of drill cores from 25 years of exploration work remain at the site

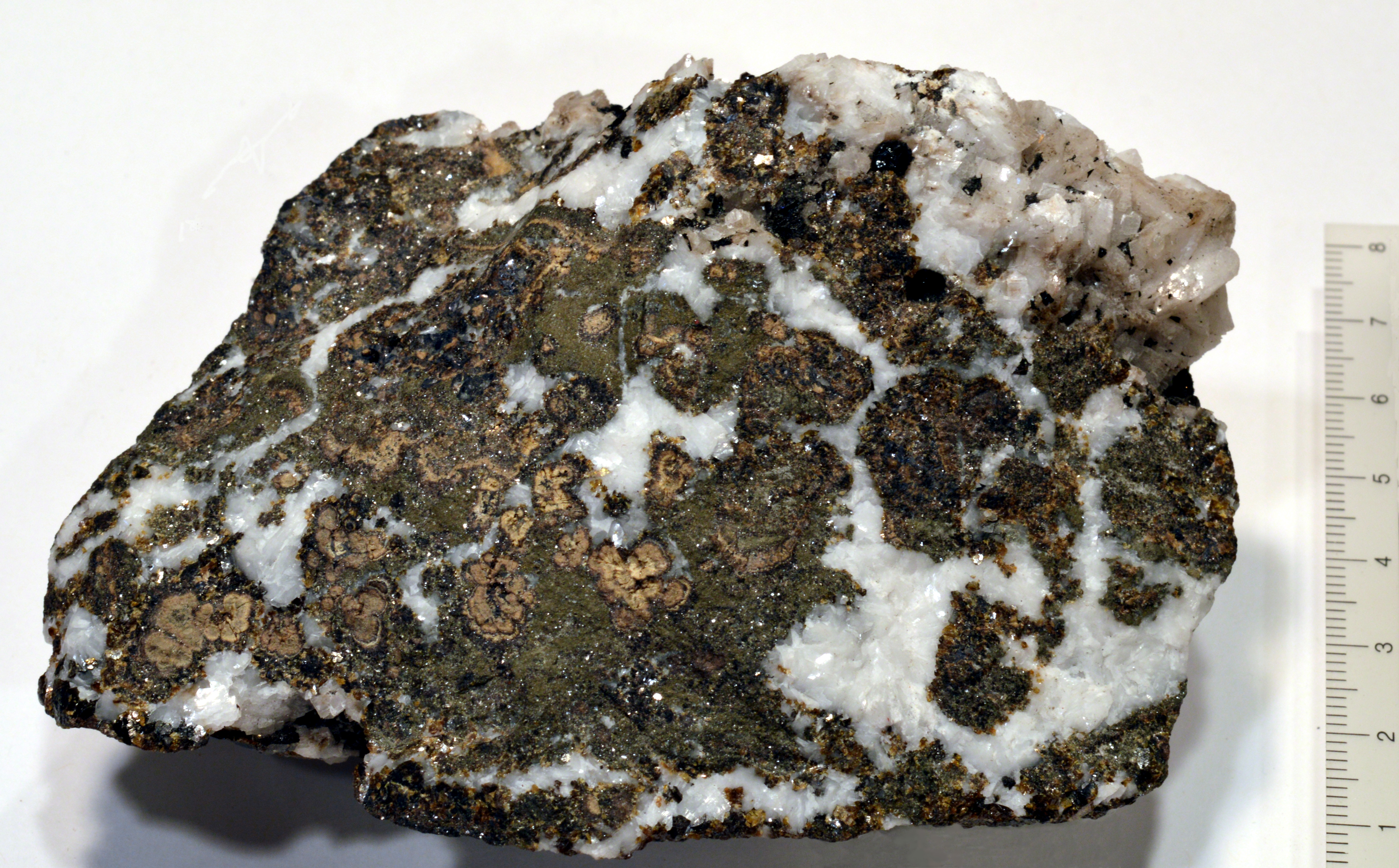
Ore sample from the Pine Point Mine, N.W.T., Canada

The Pine Point ore deposit was discovered in the late 19th century by fur traders at Fort Resolution who learned of the lead ores from the First Nations. A minor staking rush occurred in 1898 when Klondike prospectors heard rumours of silver at the location. There was no silver to be found, and although the lead ore was very rich, it was not feasible to mine the isolated deposit without good transportation to the south.

The first major exploration work was done in 1928–1930 when several short shafts were sunk and a churn drill was brought to the area to drill into the rich ores. That work was halted by the Great Depression. Geological investigation by Cominco after World War II led to new theories of how the ore deposits were hosted, and by 1955 an extensive exploration program had outlined several thousand tons of ore along a 20 km (12 mi) belt.

The Government of Canada built the Great Slave Railway from Grimshaw, Alberta to the mine; construction started in 1962 and was completed in 1964, at which time it was made part of the then-Crown Corporation, the Canadian National Railway (CN Rail). The railway line was sold by CN Rail to become a short line named the Mackenzie Northern Railway, but was later reacquired by CN Rail.

Official production at the mine commenced in 1965. Cominco built its own townsite which became known as Pine Point. It became a territorial settlement with private businesses, and boasted a population of nearly 2,000 at its peak. When the mine closed in 1988, the single-industry town was forced to close, and the rail spur was removed.

The mine produced and shipped 10,785,000 tons of lead and zinc concentrates / high-grade ores after mining and milling 69,416,000 tons of ore material. Contained metal was approximately 2 million tons of lead and 7 million tons of zinc.

=== Development since 2000 ===
In the 2000s, Tamerlane Ventures Inc. purchased the mine in the hopes of restarting the operations. The effort failed due to low metal prices at the time and the company filed for bankruptcy. Darnley Bay Resources Ltd. purchased the project for $8 million in December 2016 and hired about 20 staff in neighbouring communities for exploratory drilling and line cutting. The company is expected to invest $154 million into the mine and would employ 320 workers at full capacity. The company highlighted cost savings from the nearby highway and railroad constructed previously for the mine in 1980s as well as the electricity generated from the hydroelectric project from Taltson River.

The mine was acquired by Osisko Metals in December 2017 and further exploration is underway to delineate potential for further development. The Pine Point Project is now owned by Pine Point Mining, a joint venture between Osisko Metals and Appian Natural Resources, that was formed in 2023.

== Geology ==
The Pine Point deposit is a carbonate-hosted lead-zinc ore deposits (Mississippi Valley Type deposit). It consists of a series of more than 80 bodies of lead-zinc mineralization distributed along a trend about 65 km (40 mi) long by about 24 km (15 mi) wide. The ore is localized in solution-collapse (karst) structures where sulfide minerals preferentially replaced some of the carbonate host rocks, dolomite and limestone), of the Presqu'ile Formation. Minerals present include galena, sphalerite, marcasite, pyrite, dolomite, calcite, sulphur and bitumen. The sulfide minerals were probably deposited by hydrothermal fluids that rose along an underlying shear zone.
