= Wally Schumann =

Canadian politician

The Honourable Wally Schumann

Member of the Legislative Assembly of the Northwest Territories for Hay River South
- In office November 23, 2015 – September 2, 2019
- Preceded by: Jane Groenewegen
- Succeeded by: Rocky Simpson Sr.

Personal details
- Party: non-partisan consensus government (territorial politicians are elected on a non-partisan basis)
- Other political affiliations: Conservative Party of Canada (federal)

Wally Schumann is a Canadian politician, who was elected to the Legislative Assembly of the Northwest Territories in the 2015 election. He represented the electoral district of Hay River South, until the 2019 election, when he was defeated by Rocky Simpson Sr.

== Election results ==
2023 Northwest Territories general election: Hay River South
Candidate	Votes	%
Vince McKay	282	38.63
Wally Schumann	238	32.60
Rocky Simpson Sr. (I)	210	28.77
Total votes	730	

2019 Northwest Territories general election: Hay River South
Candidate	Votes
Rocky Simpson Sr.	350
Wally Schumann	322

2015 Northwest Territories general election: Hay River South
Candidate	Votes	%
Wally Schumann	372	47.2%
Jane Groenewegen	274	34.8%
Brian Willows	142	18.0%
Total valid ballots / Turnout	788	57%
