= Churn drill =

Ground boring machine

The churn drill is a large drilling machine that bores large diameter holes in the ground. In mining, they were used to drill into the soft carbonate rocks of lead and zinc hosted regions to extract bulk samples of the ore. Churn drills are also called percussion drills, as they function by lifting and dropping a heavy chisel-like bit which breaks the rock as it falls. Churn drills are most effective in soft- to medium-density rock of relative shallow depth (10–50 metres).

== History ==
Churn drills were invented as early as 221 BC in Qin dynasty China, capable of reaching a depth of 1500 m. Churn drills in ancient China were built of wood and labor-intensive, but were able to go through solid rock. The churn drill appeared in Europe during the 12th century. A churn drill using steam power, based on "the ancient Chinese method of lifting and dropping a rod tipped with a bit," was first built in 1835 by Isaac Singer in the United States, according to The History of Grinding. In America, they were common in the Tri-State district areas during the lead and zinc mining in Missouri, Oklahoma, and Kansas.

There is an example of one of these machines at the Northern Life Museum in Fort Smith, Northwest Territories, Canada. It was used in 1929–1930 at the Pine Point lead and zinc mine in the Northwest Territories.
