= Hay River South =

Territorial electoral district in the Northwest Territories, Canada

Northwest Territories electoral district

Territorial electoral district
- Legislature: Legislative Assembly of the Northwest Territories
MLA
Vince McKay
- First contested: 1999
- Last contested: 2023

Demographics
- Census subdivision(s): Hay River

Hay River South is a territorial electoral district for the Legislative Assembly of the Northwest Territories, Canada. It is one of two districts that represent Hay River.

== Members of the Legislative Assembly (MLAs) ==
Name	Elected	Left Office
District created from Hay River
Jane Groenewegen	1999	2015
Wally Schumann	2015	2019
Rocky Simpson Sr.	2019	2023
Vince McKay	2023	present

== Election results ==
=== 2023 election ===
2023 Northwest Territories general election
Candidate	Votes	%
Vince McKay	282	38.63
Wally Schumann	238	32.60
Pierre Simpson (I)	210	28.77
Total votes	730	

=== 2019 election ===
2019 Northwest Territories general election
Candidate	Votes
Rocky Simpson Sr.	350
Wally Schumann	322

=== 2015 election ===
2015 Northwest Territories general election
Candidate	Votes	%
Wally Schumann	372	47.2%
Jane Groenewegen	274	34.8%
Brian Willows	142	18.0%
Total valid ballots / Turnout	788	57%

=== 2011 election ===
2011 Northwest Territories general election
Candidate	Votes
Jane Groenewegen	465
Marc Miltenberger	339

=== 2007 election ===
2007 Northwest Territories general election
Candidate	Votes	%
Jane Groenewegen	423	50.72%
Marc Miltenberger	384	46.04%
Greg McMeekin	10	1.20%
Total valid ballots / Turnout	817	77.37%
Rejected ballots	17	
Source(s) "Official Voting Results 2007 General Election" (PDF). Elections NWT. Archived from the original (PDF) on 11 April 2008.

=== 2003 election ===
2003 Northwest Territories general election
Candidate	Votes	%
Jane Groenewegen	426	44.59%
Duncan McNeill	286	29.92%
Ann M. Lobb	225	23.54%
Harvey Werner	19	1.99%
Total valid ballots / Turnout	956	86.01%
Rejected ballots	3	
Source(s) "Official Voting Results 2003 General Election" (PDF). Elections NWT. Archived from the original (PDF) on 11 April 2008.

=== 1999 election ===
1999 Northwest Territories general election
Candidate	Votes
Jane Groenewegen	Acclaimed
Source(s) "Official Voting Results 1999 General Election" (PDF). Elections NWT. Archived from the original (PDF) on 11 April 2008.

== Notes ==
a: In the 2007 election, percentages assigned to candidates were based on the total votes cast. In prior elections the percentages were based on the valid votes.

== See also ==
- List of Northwest Territories territorial electoral districts
- Canadian provincial electoral districts
