= XHCAM-FM =

Radio station in Campeche, Campeche, Mexico

- Campeche, Campeche; Mexico
- Frequency: 101.9 FM
- Branding: Kiss FM

Programming
- Format: Adult contemporary

Ownership
- Owner: Grupo SIPSE Radio; (Radio Campeche, S.A. de C.V.)

History
- First air date: December 13, 1962 (concession); 1994 (FM)
- Former frequencies: 1280 kHz (1962–2017)
- Call sign meaning: First three letters of "Campeche"

Technical information
- ERP: 10,000 watts
- HAAT: 51.04 m
- Transmitter coordinates: 19°50′52″N 90°32′00″W

Links
- Webcast: Listen live
- Website: sipseplay.com/kiss-101-9-campeche

XHCAM-FM is a radio station in Campeche, Campeche, Mexico. It currently airs an adult contemporary music format as Kiss FM.

== History ==
The concession for XECAM-AM 1280 was issued on December 13, 1962. It became an FM combo in 1994 with XHCAM-FM 98.9. It moved to 101.9 MHz in 2005 in order to increase its power from 1,640 watts while not affecting XHCMN-FM in Ciudad del Carmen.

The AM station was surrendered on November 24, 2017.
