= Hay River, Northwest Territories =

Hay River Xátł'odehchee Xatlodehchee
- Town
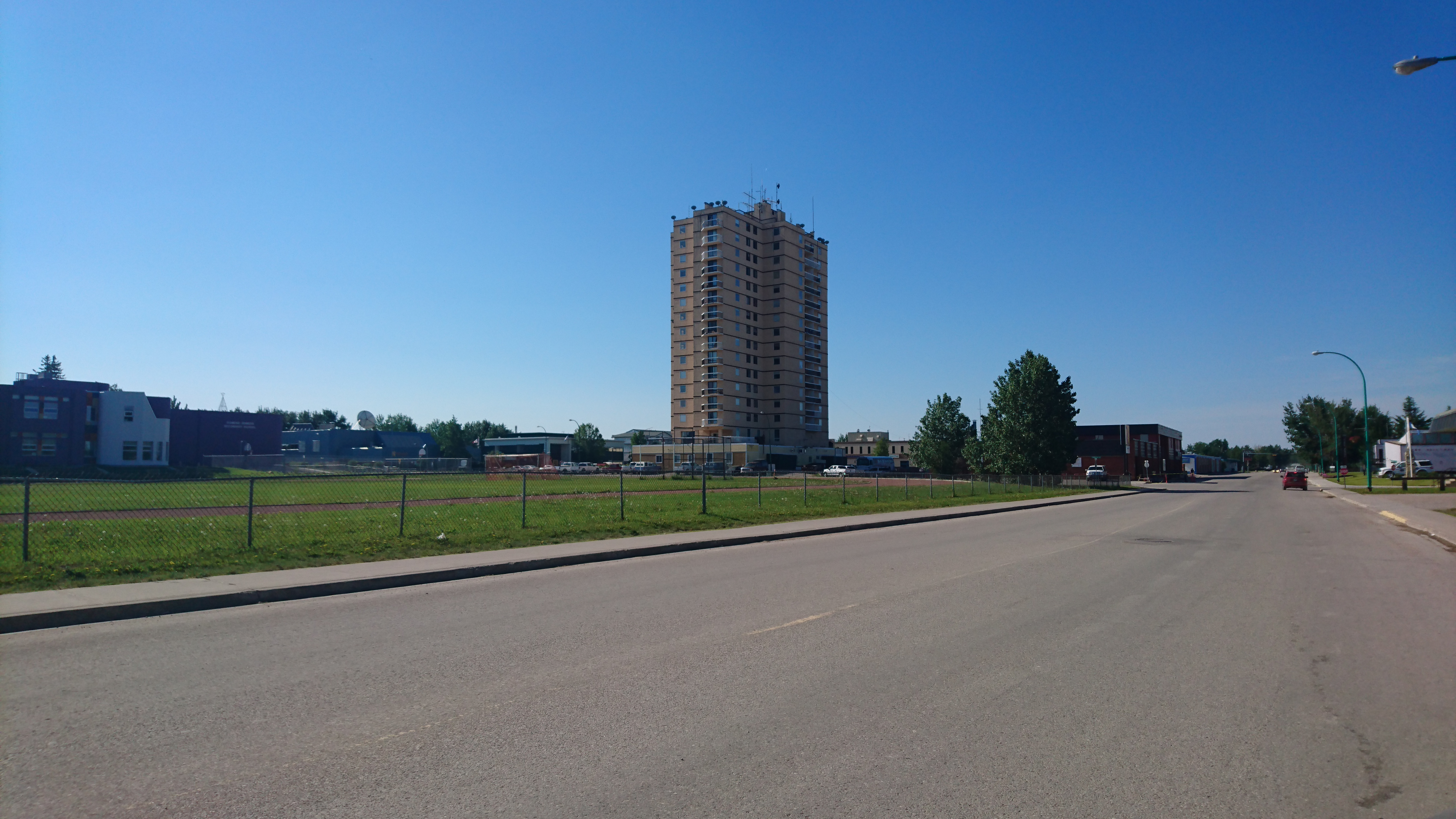
- The High Rise dominates the skyline
- Motto: Hub of the North
- Location within Northwest Territories Location within Canada
- Coordinates: 60°48′35″N 115°47′23″W
- Country: Canada
- Territory: Northwest Territories
- Region: South Slave Region
- Constituency: Hay River North; Hay River South
- Census division: Region 5
- Incorporated (town): 27 June 1963

Government
  - Mayor: Kandis Jameson
  - Senior Administrative Officer: Glenn Smith
  - MLA: Vince McKay (South)
  - MLA: R.J. Simpson (North)

Area (2021)
  - Land: 122.4 km^{2} (47.3 sq mi)
  - Population centre: 3.16 km^{2} (1.22 sq mi)
- Elevation: 165 m (541 ft)

Population (2021)
  - Total: 3,169
  - Density: 25.9/km^{2} (67/sq mi)
  - Population centre: 2,380
  - Population centre density: 752.8/km^{2} (1,950/sq mi)
- Time zone: UTC−06:00 (Northwest Territories Time)
- Canadian Postal code: X0E 0R0 – 0R9/1G1 – 1G5
- Area code: 867
- Telephone exchange: 874/5
  - Living cost: 132.5^{A}
  - Food price index: 121.3^{B}
- Climate: Dfc
- Website: www.hayriver.com
- Sources: Department of Municipal and Community Affairs, Prince of Wales Northern Heritage Centre, Canada Flight Supplement^A2013 figure based on Edmonton = 100^B2015 figure based on Yellowknife = 100

Hay River (South Slavey: Xátł’odehchee [xátɬ’otɛhtʃʰe]), known as "the Hub of the North", is a town and the second-largest community in the Northwest Territories, Canada. The town is located on the south shore of Great Slave Lake at the mouth of the Hay River. It is separated into two sections: A new town and an old town. The Hay River/Merlyn Carter Airport is located between the two sections. The town is situated in the South Slave Region, and along with Fort Smith, the town is home to one of the two regional offices in the region.

== History ==
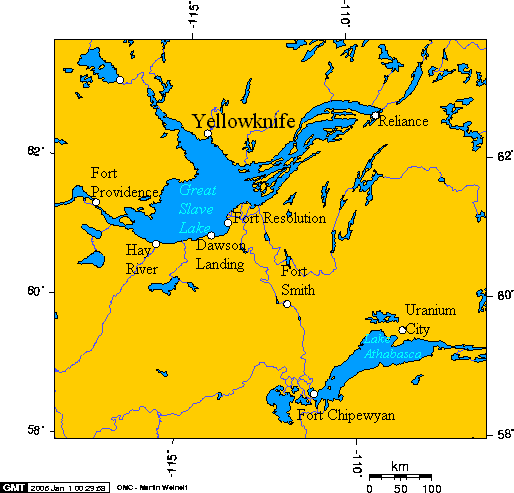
Hay River on Great Slave Lake

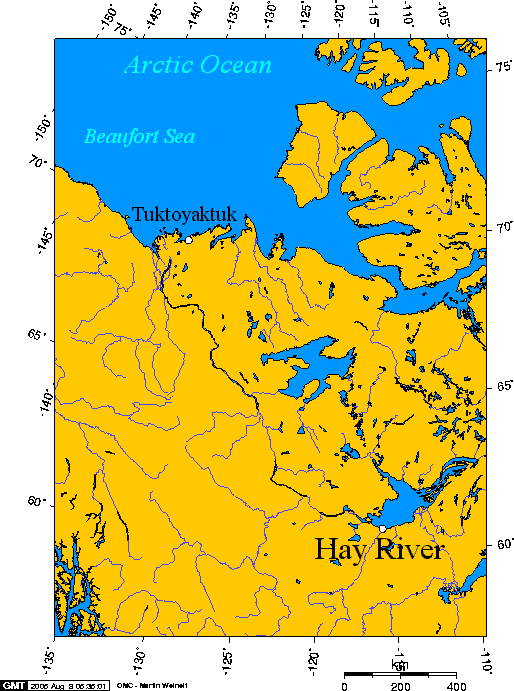
Hay River connection to the Arctic Ocean

The area has been in use by First Nations, known as the Long Spear people, as far back as 7000 BC.

According to the Legislative Assembly of the Northwest Territories the first buildings were those of the Hudson's Bay Company in 1868 followed by a Roman Catholic Mission in 1869 and an Anglican Mission in 1894.

However, according to the history of the area provided by the town, the first permanent settlement in the area of Hay River was established in what is now the Katl'odeeche First Nation or Hay River Reserve. This was sometime between 1892 and 1893. This first settlement was established by Chief Chiatlo and a group of people by the building of log cabins and bringing dairy cows. This was followed in 1893 by the Anglican Mission, at the request of Chief Chiatlo in 1893 with the Roman Catholic Mission and the Hudson's Bay Company arriving later.

A school, health centre and the Royal Canadian Mounted Police followed, and as part of the Canol Road project the United States Army Corps of Engineers built a runway on Vale Island in the Hay River delta. In 1948 the Government of Canada built a gravel road, now the Mackenzie Highway, from Grimshaw, Alberta to Hay River, making it the first community in the NWT to be linked with southern Canada. The settlement's role as terminus of all-season trucking, and the establishment of a commercial fishing industry, started an economic boom. In 1949, the community organized its first community government, forming an Administrative District under the direction of the Government of Canada, run by a trustee board with two elected members, two appointed members, and a chairman.

In 1959, the Northern Transportation Company Limited located their main base in Hay River and over the years developed the facilities. Today the base is the major staging point for the annual sealift along the Mackenzie River, via Inuvik and Tuktoyaktuk and the communities of the Arctic Ocean, as far east as Taloyoak, Nunavut and west to Utqiagvik, Alaska.

In 1963, Vale Island, the historical location of the town, was severely flooded. As a response, the town was moved to the new location upstream. The town's only physician and surgeon, Dr. Cherer Penny, is lauded as a hero for inoculating the entire town's population against typhoid fever because sewage overflow posed a high risk of contamination.

By 1964, as part of the Pine Point Mine development, the Mackenzie Northern Railway was constructed. The railway, through Canadian National Railway in Edmonton, makes Hay River the northernmost point in Canada, and all of North America, which is connected to the continental railway system. The Alaska Railroad is located farther north but is orphaned from the network.

In 1978, Hay River, along with the now-abandoned Pine Point, hosted the fifth Arctic Winter Games.

In 2022, the town suffered flooding caused by ice breakup on the Hay River, resulting in an evacuation order for the entire community. Ice jams built up in two channels, and combined with a wide-ranging storm system, and already waterlogged ground resulted in a larger than normal flood. Hay River also flooded in 1963, 2008, 2009, and 2020.

On 25 August 2023 the entire town population was ordered to evacuate by the government of the Northwest Territories due to the 2023 Canadian wildfires.

== Services ==
The community has a full hospital, the H.H. Williams Memorial Hospital, a woman's shelter/transition house, a dental clinic and an ambulance service. The RCMP detachment has eight members and the South Mackenzie Correctional Centre is located here. There are two grocery stores in Hay River, including the Northern Store, branches of both the Canadian Imperial Bank of Commerce and the Royal Bank of Canada and a Home Hardware. There is also a museum detailing the history of Hay River and the Hudson's Bay Company in Old Town.

Airlines servicing Hay River include the locally based Buffalo Airways, who provide scheduled flights to Yellowknife as well as charter services and a courier service throughout the north. First Air provides scheduled services to Yellowknife with connections elsewhere. Northwestern Air also offers scheduled service to Edmonton and Fort Smith. Other companies offering charter services in Hay River include Landa Aviation, Carter Air Services (fixed-wing aircraft), Denendeh Helicopters and Remote Helicopters.

Religious services include a Catholic church, an Anglican/Grace United church, a Baptist church, a Pentecostal church, and a Community Fellowship within New Town. There is also a Jehovah's Witness Kingdom Hall along the highway coming into town. On the Katl'odeeche First Nations Reserve there are a small Catholic church, and a larger Pentecostal church. There is also an Anglican church that was destroyed in the 2008 Hay River ice breakup. The religious diversity in Hay River exceeds the outward appearance given by these services.

== Education ==
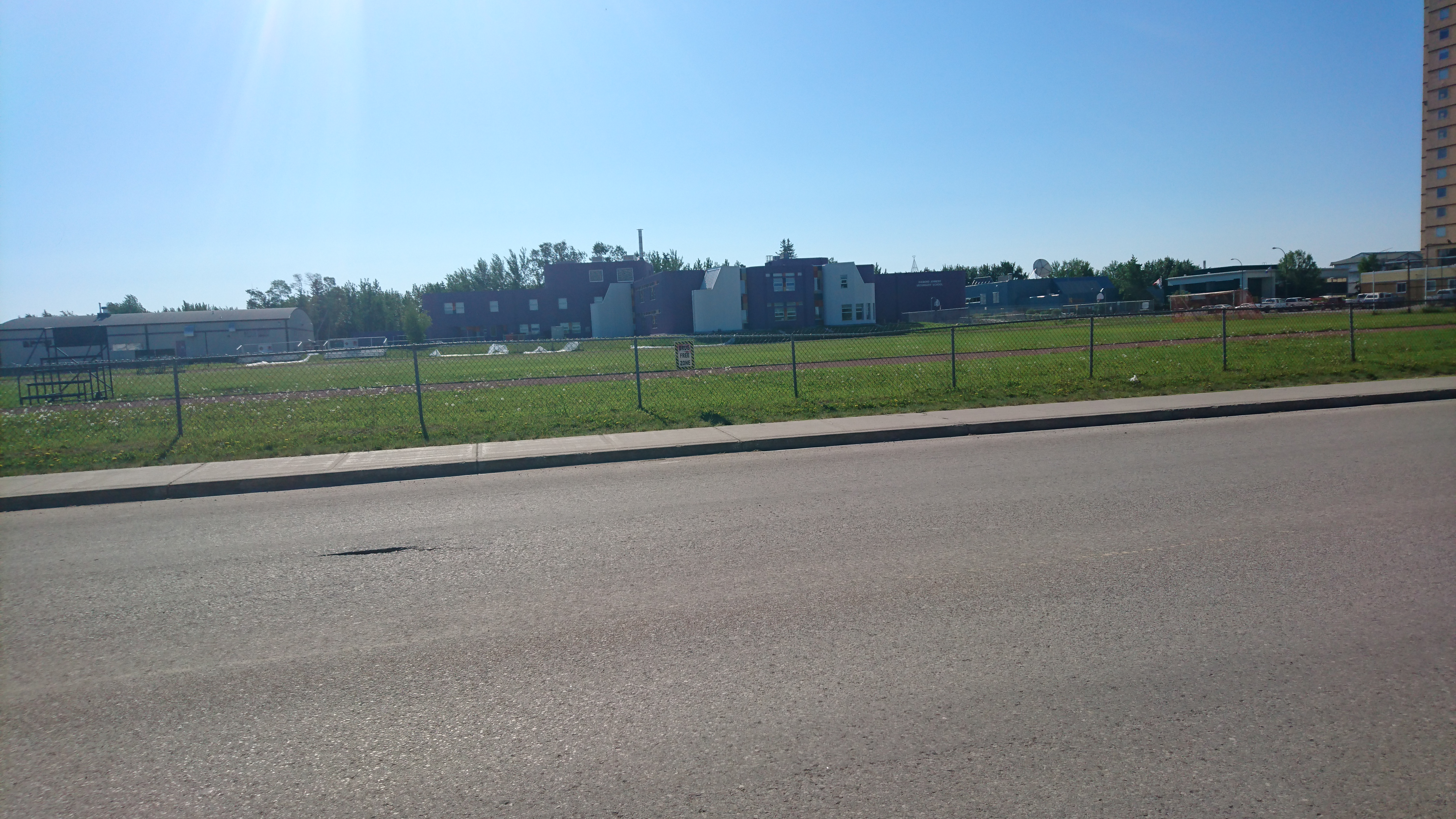
Diamond Jenness Secondary School

The town hosts four schools, three of which are administered by South Slave Divisional Education Council (SSDEC). The SSDEC is responsible for Harry Camsell K-3 School, Princess Alexandra Middle School, and Diamond Jenness Secondary School, while École Boréale Francophone school is administered separately by the Commission scolaire francophone des Territoires du Nord-Ouest. Harry Camsell is a primary school and serves students from kindergarten to Grade 3. Princess Alexandra, named for and opened by Princess Alexandra in 1967, is a middle school and serves the Grade 4 to the Grade 7. École Boréale is a francophone school that was opened in 2005 and works with students from PK4 to grade 12. Diamond Jenness, named for scientist and anthropologist Diamond Jenness and opened in 1973, is the high school and serves Grade 8 to Grade 12. The town also supports a Community Learning Centre and a Career Centre.

== Media ==
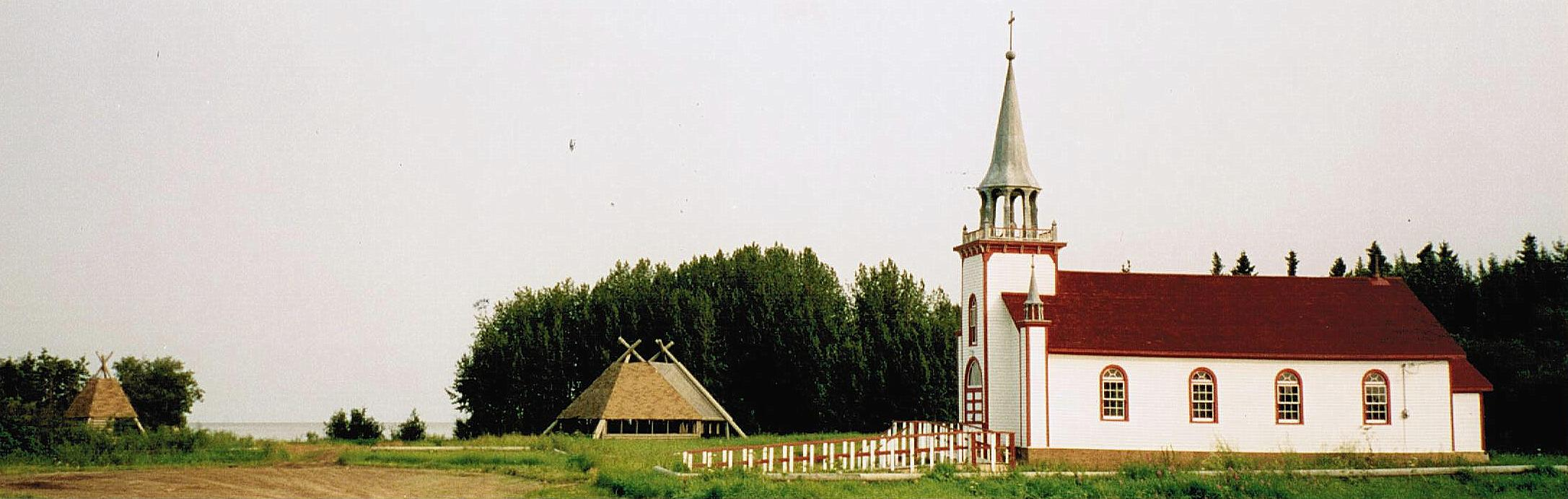
Church in Hay River

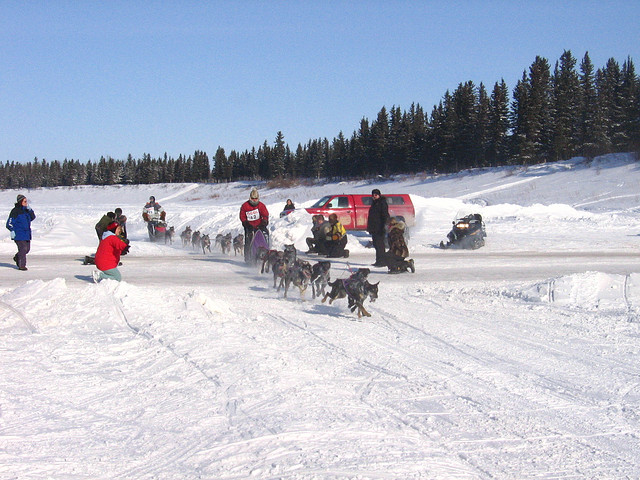
Dog sledding at the Hay River Winter Carnival

=== Radio ===
Frequency	Call sign	Branding	Format	Owner	Notes
FM 93.7	CBDJ-FM	CBC Radio One	Talk radio, public radio	Canadian Broadcasting Corporation	Rebroadcaster of CFYK-FM (Yellowknife)
FM 100.1	CJCD-FM-1	100.1 True North FM	Adult contemporary	Vista Broadcast Group	Rebroadcaster of CJCD-FM (Yellowknife)
FM 101.9	CHRR-FM	CKLB Radio: The Voice of Denendeh	Community radio	Native Communications Society of the Northwest Territories	First Nations community radio; rebroadcaster of CKLB-FM (Yellowknife)
FM 107.3	CKHR-FM	Hay River Community Radio	Community radio	Hay River Community Service Society	

CKHR-FM 107.3 is a community radio station in Hay River, and the only station in Hay River to maintain local studios; it is owned and operated by the Hay River Community Service Society. Other radio stations in Hay River are repeaters of stations based in Yellowknife.

=== Television ===
The Hay River Community Service Society controls television broadcasting and it is paid for through property taxes, at a rate of $36 per household per year. Channels 2–5, 7, and 8–13 rebroadcast Canadian and US channels in analog format from towers atop the Mackenzie Place highrise. Transmitter powers range from 9W to 2.545 kW. Channels include CIHC-TV channel 5, a community channel; CH4435 channel 8, rebroadcasting Radio-Canada through CBFT Montreal; and CH4160 channel 12, repeating the Aboriginal Peoples Television Network; among other channels. The local CBC-owned CBC North television repeater, CBEBT-1 channel 7, closed on 31 July 2012; however, the Hay River Community Service Society announced that it acquired the transmitter, which they intended to use for CBC Television service.

=== Print ===
The Hub is a weekly newspaper published by Northern News Services. Besides Hay River, the paper is available in Yellowknife, Enterprise, Fort Smith, Inuvik, Fort Providence, Fort Resolution and Grande Prairie.

== Communications ==
Internet services are provided by SSI Micro and NorthwesTel, land based telephone by Northwestel and cell phones by NMI Mobility.

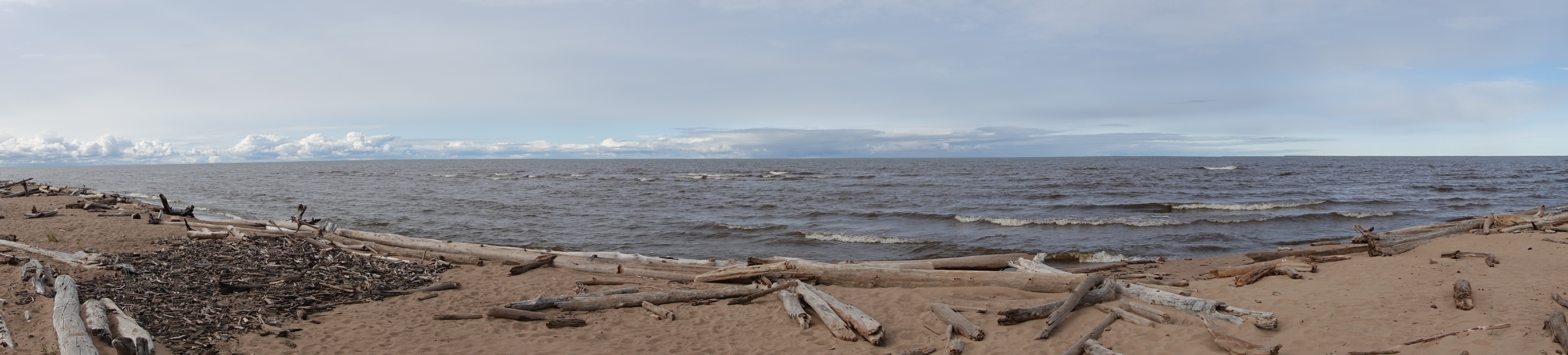
The shore of the Great Slave Lake at Hay River

== Climate ==
Hay River has a subarctic climate (Köppen Dfc) with summer lasting for about three months. Although winter temperatures are usually below freezing, every month of the year has seen temperatures above 10 °C (50 °F). Rainfall, which can occur throughout the year, averages 217.4 mm (8.56 in) and snowfall 138.9 cm (54.7 in). From December to January on average there are 71.8 days when the wind chill is below −30, which indicates that frostbite may occur within 10 – 30 minutes.

The highest temperature ever recorded in Hay River was 36.7 °C (98.1 °F) on 9 August 1981. The coldest temperature ever recorded was −52.2 °C (−62.0 °F) on 23 January 1906.

Climate data for Hay River (Hay River/Merlyn Carter Airport) WMO ID: 71935; coordinates 60°50′23″N 115°46′58″W; elevation: 164.9 m (541 ft); 1991–2020 normals, extremes 1893–present (Note: Climate data was recorded at Hay River from September 1893 to June 1943 and at Hay River Airport from April 1943 to present.)
Month	Jan	Feb	Mar	Apr	May	Jun	Jul	Aug	Sep	Oct	Nov	Dec	Year
Record high humidex	10.6	12.9	17.3	25.8	31.1	35.1	44.6	39.8	32.2	25.4	12.8	11.2	44.6
Record high °C (°F)	10.7 (51.3)	13.9 (57.0)	17.6 (63.7)	26.0 (78.8)	33.3 (91.9)	34.0 (93.2)	35.6 (96.1)	36.7 (98.1)	31.7 (89.1)	25.6 (78.1)	15.0 (59.0)	14.4 (57.9)	36.7 (98.1)
Mean daily maximum °C (°F)	−16.9 (1.6)	−13.7 (7.3)	−7.7 (18.1)	2.4 (36.3)	11.4 (52.5)	18.4 (65.1)	21.7 (71.1)	19.9 (67.8)	13.8 (56.8)	4.3 (39.7)	−7.0 (19.4)	−14.2 (6.4)	2.7 (36.9)
Daily mean °C (°F)	−21.4 (−6.5)	−19.1 (−2.4)	−13.7 (7.3)	−3.1 (26.4)	5.9 (42.6)	12.9 (55.2)	16.6 (61.9)	14.9 (58.8)	9.2 (48.6)	0.8 (33.4)	−10.7 (12.7)	−18.4 (−1.1)	−2.2 (28.0)
Mean daily minimum °C (°F)	−25.8 (−14.4)	−24.3 (−11.7)	−19.6 (−3.3)	−8.6 (16.5)	0.3 (32.5)	7.4 (45.3)	11.5 (52.7)	9.8 (49.6)	4.5 (40.1)	−2.7 (27.1)	−14.4 (6.1)	−22.6 (−8.7)	−7.0 (19.4)
Record low °C (°F)	−52.2 (−62.0)	−50.6 (−59.1)	−47.2 (−53.0)	−40.0 (−40.0)	−24.4 (−11.9)	−6.1 (21.0)	−1.7 (28.9)	−6.7 (19.9)	−15.6 (3.9)	−26.1 (−15.0)	−40.8 (−41.4)	−51.2 (−60.2)	−52.2 (−62.0)
Record low wind chill	−58.7	−60.4	−54.9	−47.7	−26.6	−7.4	0.0	0.0	−17.1	−34.3	−54.4	−55.8	−60.4
Average precipitation mm (inches)	16.6 (0.65)	13.9 (0.55)	15.3 (0.60)	11.1 (0.44)	20.8 (0.82)	25.4 (1.00)	41.9 (1.65)	59.7 (2.35)	42.3 (1.67)	33.0 (1.30)	24.0 (0.94)	16.4 (0.65)	320.3 (12.61)
Average rainfall mm (inches)	0.3 (0.01)	0.2 (0.01)	0.3 (0.01)	3.9 (0.15)	16.2 (0.64)	25.1 (0.99)	43.8 (1.72)	60.2 (2.37)	42.9 (1.69)	15.9 (0.63)	0.8 (0.03)	0.3 (0.01)	209.9 (8.26)
Average snowfall cm (inches)	22.2 (8.7)	16.6 (6.5)	16.8 (6.6)	8.9 (3.5)	4.3 (1.7)	0.0 (0.0)	0.0 (0.0)	0.0 (0.0)	1.1 (0.4)	19.1 (7.5)	34.4 (13.5)	22.1 (8.7)	145.5 (57.3)
Average precipitation days (≥ 0.2 mm)	11.7	10.8	9.7	5.3	6.9	8.4	9.8	11.2	11.7	12.4	13.2	11.8	123.0
Average rainy days (≥ 0.2 mm)	0.2	0.1	0.3	2.0	5.5	8.3	9.7	11.1	11.9	6.6	1.0	0.5	57.2
Average snowy days (≥ 0.2 cm)	12.2	9.6	8.5	3.3	1.7	0.0	0.0	0.0	0.7	6.9	13.8	12.5	69.1
Average relative humidity (%) (at 1500 LST)	70.5	67.3	60.8	59.2	53.6	54.1	56.9	59.3	61.2	70.6	79.2	74.8	64.0
Source: Environment and Climate Change Canada (January minimum) (February minimum) (March minimum) (April minimum) (May minimum) (June minimum) (July minimum / maximum) (August minimum) (September minimum / maximum) (October minimum / maximum) (December minimum / maximum)

== Demographics ==
Federal census population history of Hay River
Year	Pop.	±%
1941	161	—
1951	792	+391.9%
1956	942	+18.9%
1961	1,338	+42.0%
1966	2,002	+49.6%
1971	2,406	+20.2%
1976	3,268	+35.8%
1981	2,863	−12.4%
1986	2,964	+3.5%
1991	3,206	+8.2%
1996	3,611	+12.6%
2001	3,510	−2.8%
2006	3,648	+3.9%
2011	3,606	−1.2%
2016	3,528	−2.2%
2021	3,169	−10.2%
Source: Statistics Canada

Annual population estimates

Year	Pop.	±%
1996	3,793	—
1997	3,781	−0.3%
1998	3,769	−0.3%
1999	3,782	+0.3%
2000	3,756	−0.7%
2001	3,728	−0.7%
2002	3,688	−1.1%
2003	3,682	−0.2%
2004	3,822	+3.8%
2005	3,841	+0.5%
2006	3,775	−1.7%

Year	Pop.	±%
2007	3,827	+1.4%
2008	3,763	−1.7%
2009	3,690	−1.9%
2010	3,780	+2.4%
2011	3,742	−1.0%
2012	3,730	−0.3%
2013	3,747	+0.5%
2014	3,733	−0.4%
2015	3,734	+0.0%
2016	3,746	+0.3%
2017	3,734	−0.3%

Sources: NWT Bureau of Statistics (2001–2017)

In the 2021 Canadian census conducted by Statistics Canada, Hay River had a population of 3,169 living in 1,274 of its 1,541 total private dwellings, a change of −10.2% from its 2016 population of 3,528. With a land area of 122.4 km^{2} (47.3 sq mi), it had a population density of 25.9/km^{2} (67.1/sq mi) in 2021.

=== Ethnicity ===
In 2016, the Indigenous population in Hay River is 1,630, up from 1,600 at the 2006 Canadian census, and is made up of First Nations, Métis and Inuit.

Panethnic groups in the Town of Hay River (2001−2021)
Panethnic group	2021		2016		2011		2006		2001	
Panethnic group	Pop.	%	Pop.	%	Pop.	%	Pop.	%	Pop.	%
European (Note: Statistic includes all persons that did not make up part of a visible minority or an indigenous identity.)	1,445	46.31%	1,570	45.38%	1,780	49.51%	1,845	51.11%	1,765	51.16%
Indigenous	1,390	44.55%	1,635	47.25%	1,620	45.06%	1,600	44.32%	1,565	45.36%
Southeast Asian (Note: Statistic includes total responses of "Filipino" and "Southeast Asian" under visible minority section on census.)	145	4.65%	135	3.9%	100	2.78%	105	2.91%	60	1.74%
East Asian (Note: Statistic includes total responses of "Chinese", "Korean", and "Japanese" under visible minority section on census.)	80	2.56%	50	1.45%	40	1.11%	35	0.97%	40	1.16%
South Asian	35	1.12%	15	0.43%	30	0.83%	10	0.28%	15	0.43%
African	30	0.96%	45	1.3%	15	0.42%	20	0.55%	10	0.29%
Latin American	10	0.32%	0	0%	10	0.28%	20	0.55%	0	0%
Middle Eastern (Note: Statistic includes total responses of "West Asian" and "Arab" under visible minority section on census.)	10	0.32%	0	0%	0	0%	0	0%	0	0%
Other/multiracial (Note: Statistic includes total responses of "Visible minority, n.i.e." and "Multiple visible minorities" under visible minority section on census.)	10	0.32%	0	0%	0	0%	10	0.28%	0	0%
Total responses	3,120	98.45%	3,460	98.07%	3,595	99.69%	3,610	98.96%	3,450	98.29%
Total population	3,169	100%	3,528	100%	3,606	100%	3,648	100%	3,510	100%
Note: Totals greater than 100% due to multiple origin responses

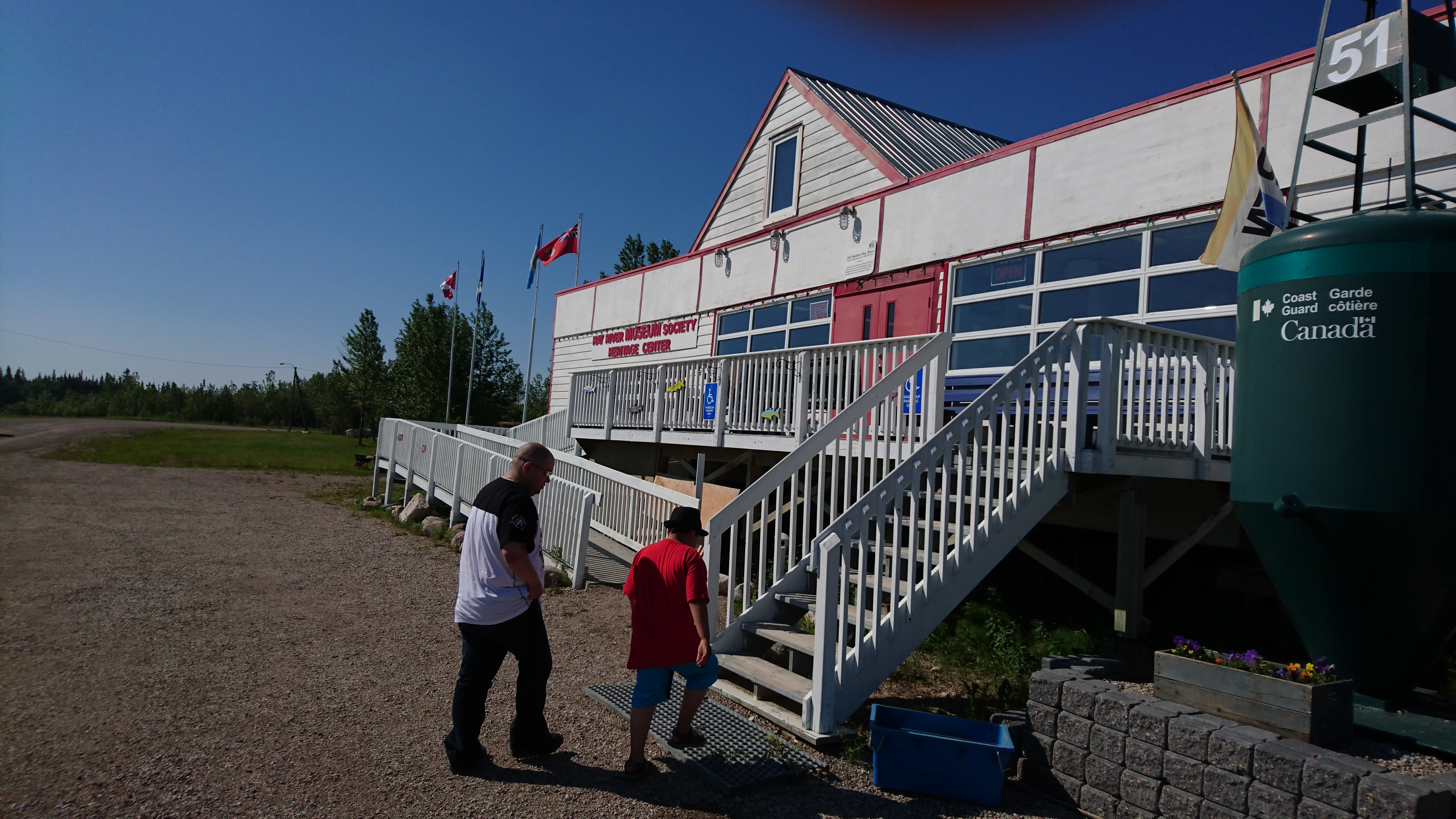
The Hay River Museum

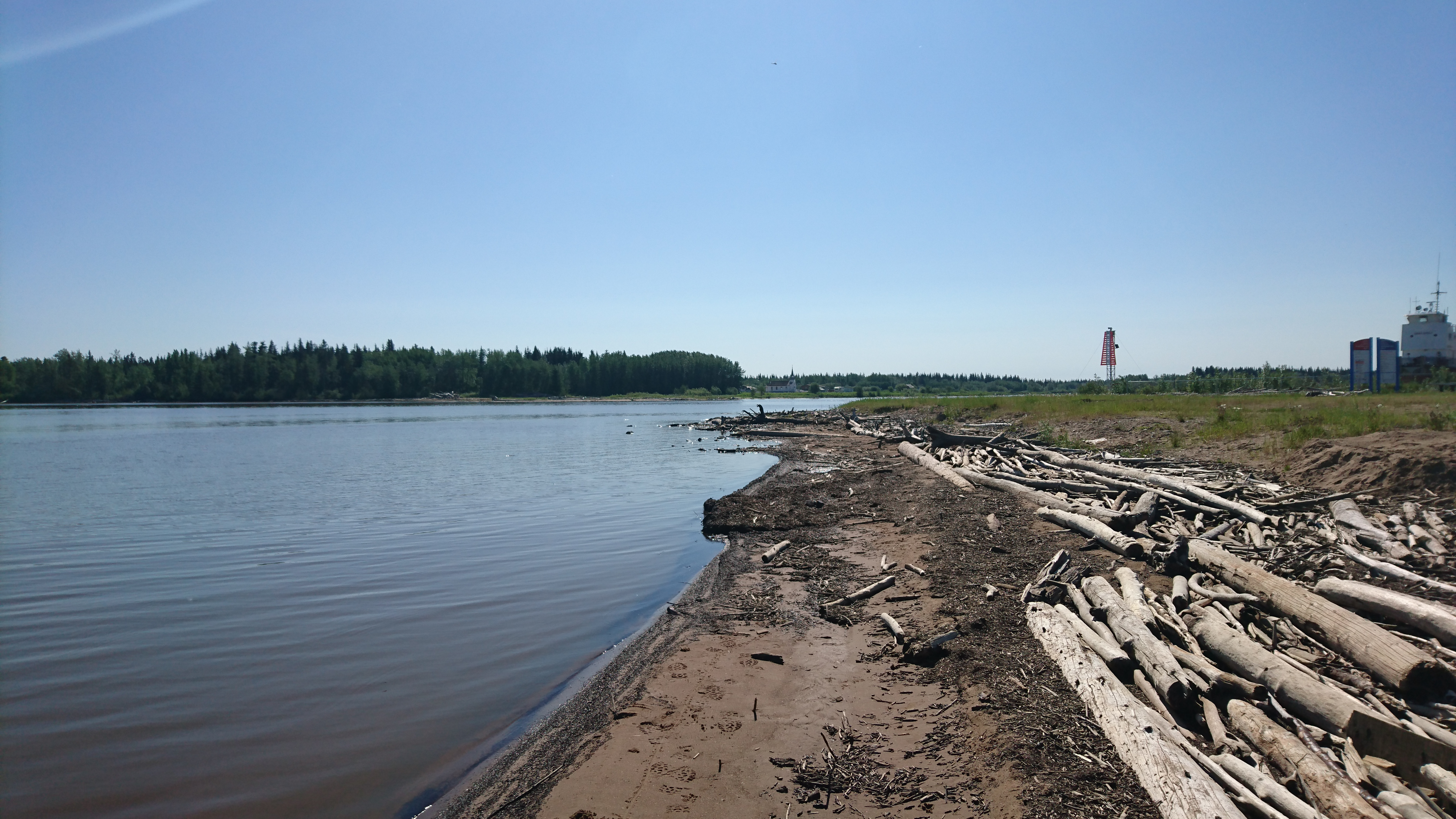
Beach at Hay River on the shores of Great Slave Lake

=== Language ===
The main languages in the town are South Slavey, Chipewyan, Michif and English.

- Mother tongue (2021):
  - Indigenous Canadian languages
  - Official languages
    - English as first language: 84.0%
    - French as first language: 3.0%
    - English and non-official language(s): 1.8%
    - English and French as first language: 1.0%
  - Indigenous Canadian languages
    - Athabaskan: 2.2%
    - Slavey: 0.8%
    - Cree: 0.5%
    - Inuinnaqtun: 0.2%
    - Inuktitut: 0.2%
    - Michif: 0.2%
    - Nehiyawewin: 0.2%
    - Tlicho: 0.2%
  - Other languages of Canada
    - Taglog: 1.9%
    - Mandarin: 0.5%
    - Vietnamese: 0.5%
    - Cantonese: 0.3%
    - German: 0.3%
    - Hiligaynon: 0.3%
    - Hindi: 0.3%
    - Korean: 0.3%
    - Polish: 0.3%
    - Arabic: 0.2%
    - Dravidian: 0.2%
    - Ilocano: 0.2%
    - Luganda (Ganda): 0.2%
    - Russian: 0.2%
    - Spanish: 0.2%
    - Ukrainian: 0.2%

== Notable people ==
- Paul Delorey, professional curler and former MLA and speaker in the Northwest Territories Legislature.
- Brendan Green, Canadian team biathlete, participated in the 2010 Winter Olympics in the Men's 4x7.5 km Relay.
- Jane Groenewegen, former member of the Legislative Assembly of the Northwest Territories from Hay River South
- Joe McBryan (Buffalo Joe), president and owner of Buffalo Airways featured on Ice Pilots NWT
- Mikey McBryan, Buffalo Airways General Manager and featured on Ice Pilots NWT
- Rob McVicar, professional ice hockey goaltender
- John Pollard, member of the Legislative Assembly of the Northwest Territories from 1987 until 1995
- Geoff Sanderson, former National Hockey League player
- Donald Morton Stewart, former mayor and speaker of the Northwest Territories Legislature
- Jelena Mrdjenovich, WBA and WBC World female featherweight boxing champion

== See also ==
- List of municipalities in the Northwest Territories
- Hay River Water Aerodrome
- Hay River (District) Heliport
