= Appian Capital Advisory =

British private equity firm

- Type: Private equity
- Industry: Mining, Metals
- Founded: 2012
- Headquarters: London, United Kingdom
- Key people: Michael W. Scherb (CEO)
- AUM: US$5 billion (2025)
- Website: appiancapitaladvisory.com

Appian Capital Advisory is a London-based private equity firm that focuses on investments in the metals and mining sector, primarily through the Appian Natural Resources Private Equity Funds. Founded in 2012, the firm targets commodities associated with the energy transition, including copper, nickel, cobalt, and graphite. As of October 2025, its assets under management totalled approximately US$5 billion.

== History ==
Appian Capital Advisory was incorporated in England and Wales on 8 June 2011 as a limited liability partnership and commenced operations in 2012.

The firm is led by founder and chief executive, Michael W. Scherb, who previously worked in J.P. Morgan's metals and mining investment banking team in London. The firm raised its first significant fund of $375 million in 2014.

In January 2021, Appian closed its second private equity fund at US$775 million. In October 2023, the firm announced the close of its third fund at US$2.06 billion.

In October 2025, Appian and the International Finance Corporation (IFC), the private sector arm of the World Bank Group, announced a US$1 billion partnership to invest in critical minerals projects in Africa and Latin America.

== Operations ==
Appian invests in metals and mining assets with operations and portfolio companies in Latin America, North America, Australia and Africa. The firm has supported 12 mines reaching production since 2016.

=== Brazil ===
In 2018, Appian acquired Mineração Vale Verde (MVV), the operator of the Serrote copper-gold mine in Brazil, from Aura Minerals. That same year, the firm acquired Atlantic Nickel (formerly Mirabela Nickel), a Brazilian nickel mining company, out of bankruptcy proceedings.

In 2021, Appian agreed to sell both the MVV and Atlantic Nickel assets to Sibanye-Stillwater in a deal valued at approximately US$1.2 billion. Sibanye-Stillwater terminated the acquisition in January 2022, citing concerns related to a geotechnical event, which Appian challenged through legal proceedings.

In October 2024, the England and Wales High Court ruled that Sibanye-Stillwater had unlawfully terminated the agreement and was liable to pay damages to Appian. In November 2025, Sibanye-Stillwater agreed to pay Appian a settlement of US$215 million to resolve the dispute out of court.

Appian has invested R$350 million in Graphcoa, a natural graphite producer with nine projects in the states of Bahia and Minas Gerais in Brazil.

=== Australia ===
In June 2020, Appian invested $144m in Gippsland Critical Minerals' Fingerboards mineral sands project in East Gippsland, Victoria.

=== Canada ===
In April 2023, Osisko Metals and Appian agreed to a four-year partnership to advance exploration, feasibility studies, and regulatory work at the Pine Point Mine in the Northwest Territories, Canada. Appian acquired a 60% interest in the project as part of the arrangement. In February 2024, Appian acquired an additional 5% stake in the Pine Point project from Osisko Metals.

=== Namibia ===
In June 2023, Appian acquired an 89.96% stake in the Rosh Pinah zinc mine in Namibia from Trevali Mining Corporation.

=== United States ===
In December 2023, Appian provided a US$230 million financing package to battery metals producer US Strategic Metals (USSM) to support the development of a cobalt-nickel mine and a hydrometallurgical recycling facility in Missouri.

In October 2023, Appian invested in Urbix and signed a joint development agreement to build a commercial graphite processing facility. In September 2024, Urbix was selected to receive a US$125 million grant from the United States Department of Energy's Manufacturing and Energy Supply Chains programme. The company has recently rebranded to Allied Graphite.

In November 2023, Appian acquired a package of mineral sands assets from Illuka Resources through its majority-owned subsidiary Atlantic Strategic Minerals (ASM). Atlantic Strategic Minerals began commercial production at its mining and mineral processing operations in Virginia in 2025. ASM is considering building a rare earths processing plant at its Stoney Creek, Virginia, operations to support domestic production of critical materials in the United States.

== Securing America's Future Energy (SAFE) partnership ==
In 2024, Appian hired former UK Deputy Prime Minister and Foreign Secretary Dominic Raab as an adviser. Raab chaired a partnership between Appian and Securing America's Future Energy (SAFE), focused on advising the US government on critical minerals supply chains.
