= XHUMI-FM =

Radio station in Torreón, Coahuila

- Torreón, Coahuila; Mexico
- Broadcast area: Comarca Lagunera
- Frequency: 101.9 MHz
- Branding: Radio Millennium

Programming
- Format: University radio

Ownership
- Owner: Universidad Millennium Internacional, S.C.

History
- First air date: 2007
- Call sign meaning: Universidad Millennium Internacional

Technical information
- Licensing authority: CRT
- Class: A
- ERP: 3 kW
- HAAT: 248.45 m (815.1 ft)
- Transmitter coordinates: 25°32′09.14″N 103°15′06.82″W

Links
- Website: web.archive.org/web/20151016064330/http://www.radioumi.com:80/

XHUMI-FM is a radio station serving Torreón, Coahuila owned by the Universidad Millennium Internacional. It is branded as Radio Millennium and broadcasts on 101.9 FM from its campus.
