= KSUG =

- Heber Springs, Arkansas; United States
- Frequency: 101.9 MHz
- Branding: 101.9 The Lake

Programming
- Format: Classic hits

Ownership
- Owner: Red River Radio

History
- First air date: May 2016
- Call sign meaning: after station owners, Dr. Joe & Ali King Sugg

Technical information
- Licensing authority: FCC
- Facility ID: 191357
- Class: C3
- ERP: 9,400 watts
- HAAT: 162 meters (531 ft)
- Transmitter coordinates: 35°34′54.8″N 91°55′44.3″W

Links
- Public license information: Public file; LMS
- Webcast: Listen live
- Website: 1019thelake.com

KSUG is a radio station licensed to Heber Springs, Arkansas, broadcasting on 101.9 FM, which signed on in May 2016. Owned by Red River Radio, the station airs a classic hits format, with weekday mornings hosted locally by station owner, Ali King.
