= CFND-FM =

Radio station in Saint-Jérôme, Quebec, Canada

Coordinates: 45°47′04″N 73°59′21″W

- Saint-Jérôme, Quebec; Canada
- Frequency: 101.9 MHz

Programming
- Format: Campus radio

Ownership
- Owner: École Notre-Dame; (Arnie Du Quartier)

History
- First air date: February 17, 2009

Technical information
- ERP: 49 watts
- HAAT: 19.4 metres

CFND-FM is a French-language community campus radio station that operates at 101.9 FM in Saint-Jérôme, Quebec, Canada.

Owned by Amie du Quartier, the station received CRTC approval in 2007.

The radio station is based at the École Notre-Dame, a primary school in Saint-Jérôme. The station's format, according to its license, is 23 hours of music, plus a 60-minute daily spoken word program, often broadcast during the school's lunch hour. All lunchtime radio shows are prepared and presented by the students from grade 5 and 6. When music is played, 65% of the selections are by francophone artists, with the formats varying between classic hits, blues, classical music and jazz. In addition, spoken-word segments, comedy bits and documentaries produced by students are aired at various parts of the day.
