= WOCT-LP =

- Oshkosh, Wisconsin; United States
- Frequency: 101.9 MHz
- Branding: Oshkosh Community Radio

Programming
- Format: Variety

Ownership
- Owner: The Friends of OCM

History
- First air date: January 26, 2006

Technical information
- Licensing authority: FCC
- Facility ID: 131805
- Class: L1
- ERP: 100 watts
- HAAT: 26.6 meters (87 ft)
- Transmitter coordinates: 44°1′13.00″N 88°32′28.10″W

Links
- Public license information: LMS
- Website: oshkoshmedia.org

WOCT-LP (101.9 FM, "Oshkosh Community Radio") is a radio station broadcasting a variety music format. Licensed to Oshkosh, Wisconsin, United States, the station is currently owned by The Friends of OCM.
