= Rocky Simpson Sr. =

Canadian politician

Rocky Simpson

Member of the Legislative Assembly of the Northwest Territories
- In office October 1, 2019 – November 14, 2023
- Preceded by: Wally Schumann
- Succeeded by: Vince McKay
- Constituency: Hay River South

Personal details
- Born: Pierre Michael Simpson; 1955 or 1956 (age 70–71)
- Party: non-partisan consensus government

Pierre Michael "Rocky" Simpson (born 1955 or 1956) is a Canadian politician, who was elected to the Legislative Assembly of the Northwest Territories in the 2019 election. He represented the electoral district of Hay River South for one term, until being defeated in the 2023 election.

He is the father of fellow MLA Rocky "R. J." Simpson, who represents Hay River North. Prior to his election to the legislature, Simpson was the owner of Concept Energy Services, a local business which constructs modular buildings; however, shortly after the election, Concept Energy Services was revealed to be $4 million in debt, including nearly $2 million owed to the territorial government's own Business Development and Investment Corporation.

== Election results ==
2023 Northwest Territories general election: Hay River South
Candidate	Votes	%
Vince McKay	282	38.63
Wally Schumann	238	32.60
Rocky Simpson Sr. (I)	210	28.77
Total votes	730	

2019 Northwest Territories general election: Hay River South
Candidate	Votes
Rocky Simpson Sr.	350
Wally Schumann	322
