= WRFP-LP =

- Eau Claire, Wisconsin; United States
- Frequency: 101.9 MHz
- Branding: Converge Radio

Programming
- Format: Indie rock

Ownership
- Owner: Eau Claire Public Access Center, Inc.
- Operator: Converge Media

Technical information
- Licensing authority: FCC
- Facility ID: 131963
- Class: L1
- ERP: 100 watts
- HAAT: 27 m (89 ft)
- Transmitter coordinates: 44°48′55.00″N 91°29′36.00″W

Links
- Public license information: LMS
- Website: Converge Radio

WRFP-LP (101.9 FM) is a radio station licensed to Eau Claire, Wisconsin, United States. The station is currently owned by Eau Claire Public Access Center, Inc.
