= WARU-FM =

- Roann, Indiana; United States
- Broadcast area: Peru, Indiana; Wabash, Indiana
- Frequency: 101.9 MHz
- Branding: 101.9 Rocks

Programming
- Format: Rock
- Affiliations: MiBash Sports Radio Network, Westwood One

Ownership
- Owner: Dream Weaver Marketing, LLC.

History
- First air date: 1965; 61 years ago
- Former call signs: WBFK (1998–1999); WMYK (1999–2001)

Technical information
- Licensing authority: FCC
- Facility ID: 78254
- Class: A
- ERP: 3,600 watts
- HAAT: 129 meters (423 ft)
- Transmitter coordinates: 40°48′30.00″N 85°56′7.00″W

Links
- Public license information: Public file; LMS

WARU-FM (101.9 FM) is a radio station licensed to Roann, Indiana, United States, broadcasting a Progressive Rock format. The station is owned and operated by Dream Weaver Marketing, LLC and features programming from the MiBash Sports Radio Network and Westwood One. The studio is located in Peru, Indiana.

== History ==
The station first signed on the air in 1965 as WARU-FM alongside its already established AM sister station WARU. For most of its early history, the station broadcast a Classic Hits format on frequency 98.3 MHz. On July 17, 1998, the station changed its call sign to WBFK. On July 13, 1999, the station again changed its call sign to WMYK. On August 12, 2001, the station reverted to WARU-FM on the current frequency 101.9 MHz. Since 2001, the station has undergone several changes to its format, such as Classic Rock, All 80s Adult Contemporary, Country, and Adult Hits. The station currently broadcasts a Classic Rock format featuring the music of legendary rock artists, routinely playing 'deep cuts' under the branding '101.9 Rocks'. The station added syndicated Pink Floyd program "Floydian Slip" in January 2022.

== Technical ==
Transmitter is a 5000 watt Broadcast Electronics FM-5T utilizing a single high power forced-air cooled metal/ceramic tetrode vacuum tube (type number 4CX3500A) in a high efficiency half wave cavity as the RF final amplifier stage. This tetrode requires approximately 100 watts of RF drive power which is generated by an all solid state BE FM250C exciter (direct FM). The audio path was upgraded in 2020 with an emphasis on fidelity vs. compression.
