= WJFL =

- Tennille, Georgia; United States
- Frequency: 101.9 MHz
- Branding: Magic 101.9

Programming
- Format: Adult contemporary
- Affiliations: ABC Radio Atlanta Falcons

Ownership
- Owner: Middle Georgia Broadcasting, Inc.

Technical information
- Licensing authority: FCC
- Facility ID: 70985
- Class: A
- ERP: 6,000 watts
- HAAT: 100 meters
- Transmitter coordinates: 32°54′49.00″N 82°53′6.00″W

Links
- Public license information: Public file; LMS

WJFL (101.9 FM) is a radio station broadcasting an adult contemporary format. Licensed to Tennille, Georgia, United States, the station is currently owned by Middle Georgia Broadcasting, Inc. and features programming from ABC Radio .
