= KQSS =

- Miami, Arizona; United States
- Broadcast area: Globe, Arizona
- Frequency: 101.9 MHz
- Branding: Gila 101.9

Programming
- Format: Country

Ownership
- Owner: Rollye Cornell and Jon Cornell; (Globecasting, Inc.)

History
- Call sign meaning: "Kiss" (former branding)

Technical information
- Licensing authority: FCC
- Facility ID: 72510
- Class: A
- ERP: 6,000 watts
- HAAT: -24 meters (-78 feet)
- Transmitter coordinates: 33°24′30″N 110°48′14″W

Links
- Public license information: Public file; LMS
- Webcast: Listen Live
- Website: http://gila1019.com/

KQSS (101.9 FM, "Gila 101.9") is a radio station licensed to serve Miami, Arizona, United States. The station is licensed to Rollye and Jon Cornell, through licensee Globecasting, Inc. It airs a country music format.

The station was assigned the KQSS call letters by the Federal Communications Commission on August 8, 1984.
