= KACQ =

- Lometa, Texas; United States
- Frequency: 101.9 MHz
- Branding: Texas Country Q102

Programming
- Format: Country music
- Affiliations: Jones Radio Network

Ownership
- Owner: Debra L. Witcher

History
- First air date: 1995

Technical information
- Licensing authority: FCC
- Facility ID: 16297
- Class: A
- ERP: 6,000 watts
- HAAT: 100 meters
- Transmitter coordinates: 31°14′33″N 98°19′19″W

Links
- Public license information: Public file; LMS
- Website: lampasasradio.com

KACQ (101.9 FM) is a radio station broadcasting a country music format. Also known as Lampasas Radio, and also operating on 1450 AM, it is licensed to Lometa, Texas, United States, and is owned by Debra L. Witcher. It features programming from Jones Radio Network.
