= KJVV =

- Twentynine Palms, California; United States
- Frequency: 101.9 MHz

Programming
- Format: Christian radio

Ownership
- Owner: Virtues Communications Network, LLC

History
- First air date: September 11, 2014

Technical information
- Licensing authority: FCC
- Facility ID: 189522
- Class: A
- ERP: 1,000 watts
- HAAT: 66 meters (217 ft)
- Transmitter coordinates: 34°09′15″N 116°11′50″W

Links
- Public license information: Public file; LMS
- Website: kjvv.net

KJVV is a radio station in Twentynine Palms, California.

== History ==
KJVV began broadcasting on September 11, 2014.
