= Life FM (Wagga Wagga) =

Coordinates: 35.105182°S 147.366346°E

Wagga's Life FM

Wagga Wagga, New South Wales, Australia; Australia
- Frequency: 101.9 MHz FM

Programming
- Format: Christian

Ownership
- Owner: Riverina Christian Radio Incorporated

History
- Call sign meaning: 2 = NSW Wagga's Life FM

Technical information
- Class: Christian community

Links
- Website: Wagga's Life FM Wagga

Life FM (callsign: 2WLF) is a Christian radio station in Wagga Wagga, New South Wales, which broadcasts on 101.9 MHz in the FM.

In 2006 Life FM relocated its studios to the Wagga Wagga Christian College.
