= CJCD-FM =

Radio station in Yellowknife

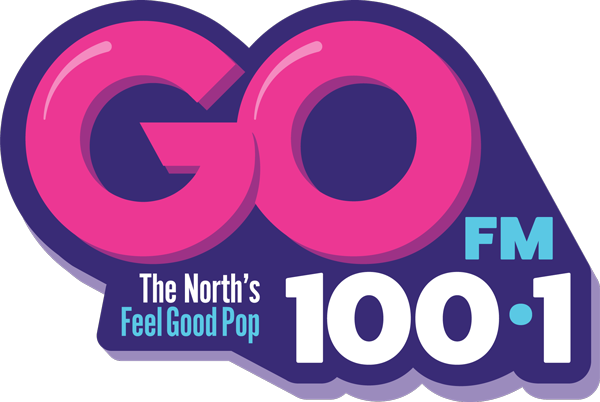

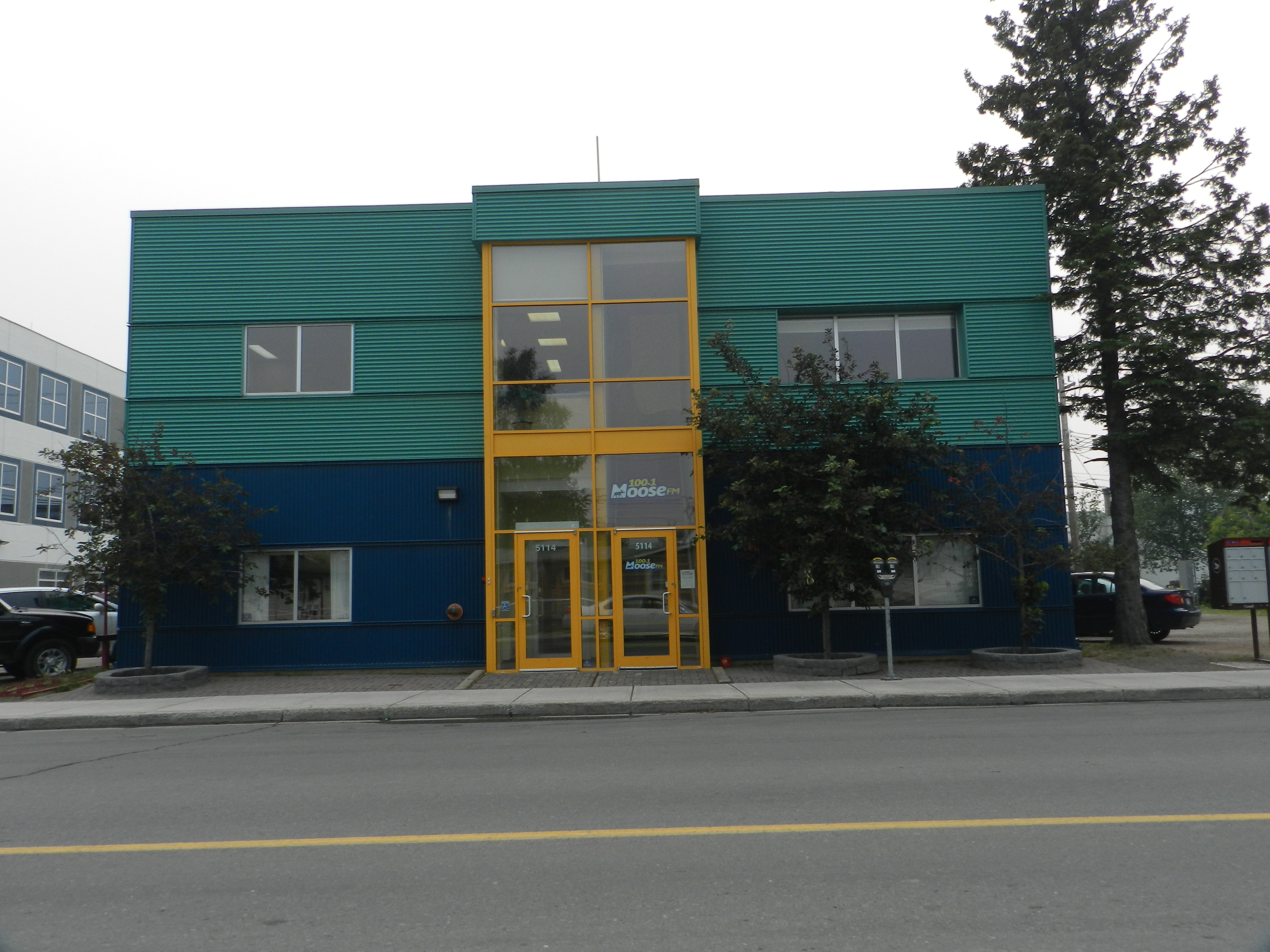
- The station's studios located on 49th Street in Yellowknife.
- Yellowknife, Northwest Territories; Canada
- Broadcast area: Yellowknife, Dettah
- Frequency: 100.1 MHz
- Branding: 100.1 GO FM

Programming
- Format: Adult contemporary

Ownership
- Owner: Vista Radio

History
- First air date: February 21, 1986 (as AM translator); January 30, 1997 (as full-powered FM)
- Former frequencies: 1240 kHz (1979–1997)
- Call sign meaning: James, Charles, and Derek (first names of station's founders)

Technical information
- Facility ID: 6250
- Class: A
- Power: 400 watts horizontal polarization only
- HAAT: 73 metres (240 ft)
- Transmitter coordinates: 62°27′12.96″N 114°22′12.00″W

Links
- Webcast: Listen Live

CJCD-FM (100.1 FM, 100.1 GO FM) is a radio station in Yellowknife, Northwest Territories, Canada. Owned by Vista Radio, it broadcasts an adult contemporary format as serving Yellowknife and Dettah.

The station also has a rebroadcaster, CJCD-FM-1 at 100.1 FM, in Hay River.

== History ==
Prior to moving to its current FM frequency in 1997, CJCD operated at AM 1240. CJCD-AM began broadcasting on November 13, 1979. On October 9, 1985, the station was granted a power increase from 1,000 to 4,000 watts. In September of the following year, a repeater in Hay River at 100.1 FM began operating. The change to FM was approved in January 1997.

The station was founded by Charles Dent, Derek Squirell and Reg James. The station was sold to the Vista Broadcast Group in 2007.

Logo used from May 2014 until November 2020.

Logo used from November 2020 until October 2025.

On May 21, 2014, CJCD rebranded under Vista's standardized "Moose" brand as 100.1 The Moose, maintaining its existing adult hits format. On November 13, 2019, CJCD celebrated its 40th anniversary on the air.

On December 3, 2020, the station flipped to classic hits as 100.1 True North FM. The rebranding was intended to be "more representative of the culture of the area", while the station aired human-interest segments known as "True North Tales" to highlight the community.

On October 20, 2025, the station flipped to hot adult contemporary as 100.1 Go FM; the new format is designed to appeal to a younger demographic than the prior classic hits format, with Vista's market manager citing Cabin Radio's newly approved Yellowknife station as an impetus for providing alternatives in the market.

As of January 2026, mornings are hosted by Keesyn Glawson while Joel hosts the drive show from 2pm-6pm.

== Rebroadcasters ==
In addition to the main station, CJCD-FM is relayed by an FM translator to widen its broadcast area.

Rebroadcasters of CJCD-FM
City of licence	Identifier	Frequency	Power	Class	RECNet	CRTC Decision
Hay River	CJCD-FM-1	100.1 FM	600 watts	C	Query	86-133
