= CHAI-FM =

Community radio station in Châteauguay, Quebec

Coordinates: 45°21′23″N 73°42′57″W

- Châteauguay, Quebec; Canada
- Frequency: 101.9 MHz
- Branding: CHAI 101.9 FM

Programming
- Format: Community radio

Ownership
- Owner: Radio Communautaire de Châteauguay Inc.

History
- First air date: 1980

Technical information
- Licensing authority: CRTC
- Class: A1
- ERP: 100 watts
- HAAT: 50 metres (160 ft)
- Repeater: CHAI-FM-1 Candiac

Links
- Website: 1019fm.net

CHAI-FM (101.9 FM) is a French-language radio station located in Châteauguay, Quebec, Canada, near Montreal.

It broadcasts with an effective radiated power of 100 watts (class A1) using an omnidirectional antenna. The station also operates a co-channel repeater, CHAI-FM-1 in Candiac, also on 101.9 FM. The use of two transmitters is in order to protect several co-channel and adjacent-channel stations in nearby areas, the closest being CIBL-FM and CINQ-FM in Montreal, plus co-channel CJSS-FM in Cornwall, Ontario. (CBMG-FM in Cowansville, a local repeater of CBME-FM that also broadcasts at 101.9, did not sign on until 2002.)

The station operates under a community radio licence and has a variety format. It opened in 1980.

In December 2015, CHAI-FM announced plans to replace its two-transmitter system with a single transmitter, from a location southeast of CHAI-FM's main Châteauguay transmitter. The new transmitter would broadcast at 238 watts, with a directional antenna set on an east–west pattern, also to protect nearby stations as discussed above; this was due to synchronization and interference problems between the Châteauguay and Candiac transmitters, which is evident where the two transmitters overlap in an area between Lachine and Delson.

The station is a member of the Association des radiodiffuseurs communautaires du Québec.
