= WKFC =

Radio station in North Corbin, Kentucky

- North Corbin, Kentucky; United States
- Broadcast area: London, Kentucky; Corbin, Kentucky
- Frequency: 101.9 MHz

Programming
- Format: Adult contemporary
- Affiliations: The Bob and Sheri Show

Ownership
- Owner: Radioactive, LLC
- Sister stations: WPBK

History
- First air date: 2008
- Former call signs: WPNS (2006–2008)
- Call sign meaning: Kentucky Fried Chicken (founded in North Corbin)

Technical information
- Licensing authority: FCC
- Facility ID: 164241
- Class: A
- ERP: 6,000 watts
- HAAT: 100 meters (330 ft)
- Transmitter coordinates: 37°02′09″N 84°05′05″W

Links
- Public license information: Public file; LMS

WKFC (101.9 FM) is an adult contemporary–formatted radio station licensed to North Corbin, Kentucky, United States, and serving the Corbin and London area. The station is owned by Radioactive, LLC.

== History ==
The station went on the air as WPNS on September 29, 2006. On March 5, 2008, the station changed its call sign to the current WKFC. The station has been attempted to be sold twice in its existence. In 2009, its owner Radioactive filed to sell the station to Lincoln-Garrard Broadcasting under a 2007 option. The deal was never finalized; however, Lincoln-Garrard continues to operate WKFC under a time brokerage agreement. In 2019, Radioactive again moved to sell WKFC, this time to Corbin–based Forcht Broadcasting, owner of three stations in the area.

A major change would come to WKFC in September 2020. The station dropped its country music format under the Nash Icon brand in favor of adult contemporary music, adding the syndicated The Bob and Sheri Show.
