= Jane Groenewegen =

Canadian politician

Member of the Legislative Assembly of the Northwest Territories
- In office October 16, 1995 – 2015
- Preceded by: John Pollard
- Succeeded by: Wally Schumann
- Constituency: Hay River (1995–1999); Hay River South (1999–2015)

Personal details
- Born: November 8, 1956 (age 69) Exeter, Ontario, Canada
- Party: Independent

Jane Mary "Ostler" Groenewegen (born November 8, 1956) is a territorial level politician from northern Canada and a former member of the Legislative Assembly of the Northwest Territories.

== Political career ==
Groenewegen was first elected to a seat in the Northwest Territories Legislature in the 1995 Northwest Territories general election. She was returned by acclamation in the 1999 Northwest Territories general election. She was appointed to the cabinet by Premier Stephen Kakfwi and she served as Deputy Premier Minister of Health and Social Services, Minister Responsible for Seniors, Persons with Disabilities and the Status of Women.

Groenewegen was elected to a third term in the 2003 Northwest Territories general election. She was not re-appointed to the cabinet and was elected Deputy Speaker. She was elected to a fourth term in the 2007 Northwest Territories general election. Her son Jeff Groenewegen also ran in that election in the electoral district of Frame Lake, but was not elected. Jane was re-elected to a fifth term in the 2011 Northwest Territories general election. In 2015 she was defeated by Wally Schumann. Unofficial tallies put her on 274 votes to Schumann's 372.

== Electoral record ==
2021 Canadian federal election: Northwest Territories
Party	Candidate	Votes	%	±%	Expenditures
Liberal	Michael McLeod	5,387	38.22	–1.48	$38,613.28
New Democratic	Kelvin Kotchilea	4,558	32.34	+10.00	$9,753.72
Conservative	Lea Anne Mollison	2,031	14.41	–11.11	$102.43
Independent	Jane Groenewegen	1,791	12.71	–	$5,119.34
Green	Roland Laufer	328	2.33	–8.30	none listed
Total valid votes/expense limit		14,095	98.91	–	$112,897.49
Total rejected ballots		155	1.09	+0.33	
Turnout		14,250	46.69	–6.78	
Eligible voters		30,519			
Liberal hold		Swing		–5.74	
Source: Elections Canada
