= WBGE =

Coordinates: 31.009°N 84.421°W

- Bainbridge, Georgia; United States
- Broadcast area: Tallahassee, Florida
- Frequency: 101.9 MHz
- Branding: Live 101.9

Programming
- Format: Hot AC

Ownership
- Owner: Flint Media, Inc.

History
- First air date: May 2001
- Call sign meaning: BainbridGE

Technical information
- Licensing authority: FCC
- Facility ID: 89183
- Class: A
- ERP: 6,000 waats
- HAAT: 100 meters (330 ft)

Links
- Public license information: Public file; LMS
- Website: live1019.com

WBGE (101.9 FM) is a Hot AC formatted radio station licensed to Bainbridge, Georgia, owned by Flint Media. While the biggest nearby market is in Florida, the station is actually the biggest station in all of Bainbridge, Georgia.
