= CKLB-FM =

First Nations community radio station in the Northwest Territories

- Yellowknife, Northwest Territories; Canada
- Broadcast area: Northwest Territories
- Frequency: 101.9 MHz
- Branding: The Voice of Denendeh

Programming
- Format: Community radio

Ownership
- Owner: Native Communications Society of the Northwest Territories

Technical information
- Class: A1
- ERP: 234 watts (peak); Horizontal polarization only
- HAAT: 52 metres (171 ft)
- Transmitter coordinates: 62°28′14.16″N 114°22′40.80″W
- Repeaters: (see article)

Links
- Webcast: http://listen.streamon.fm/cklb
- Website: http://cklbradio.com/

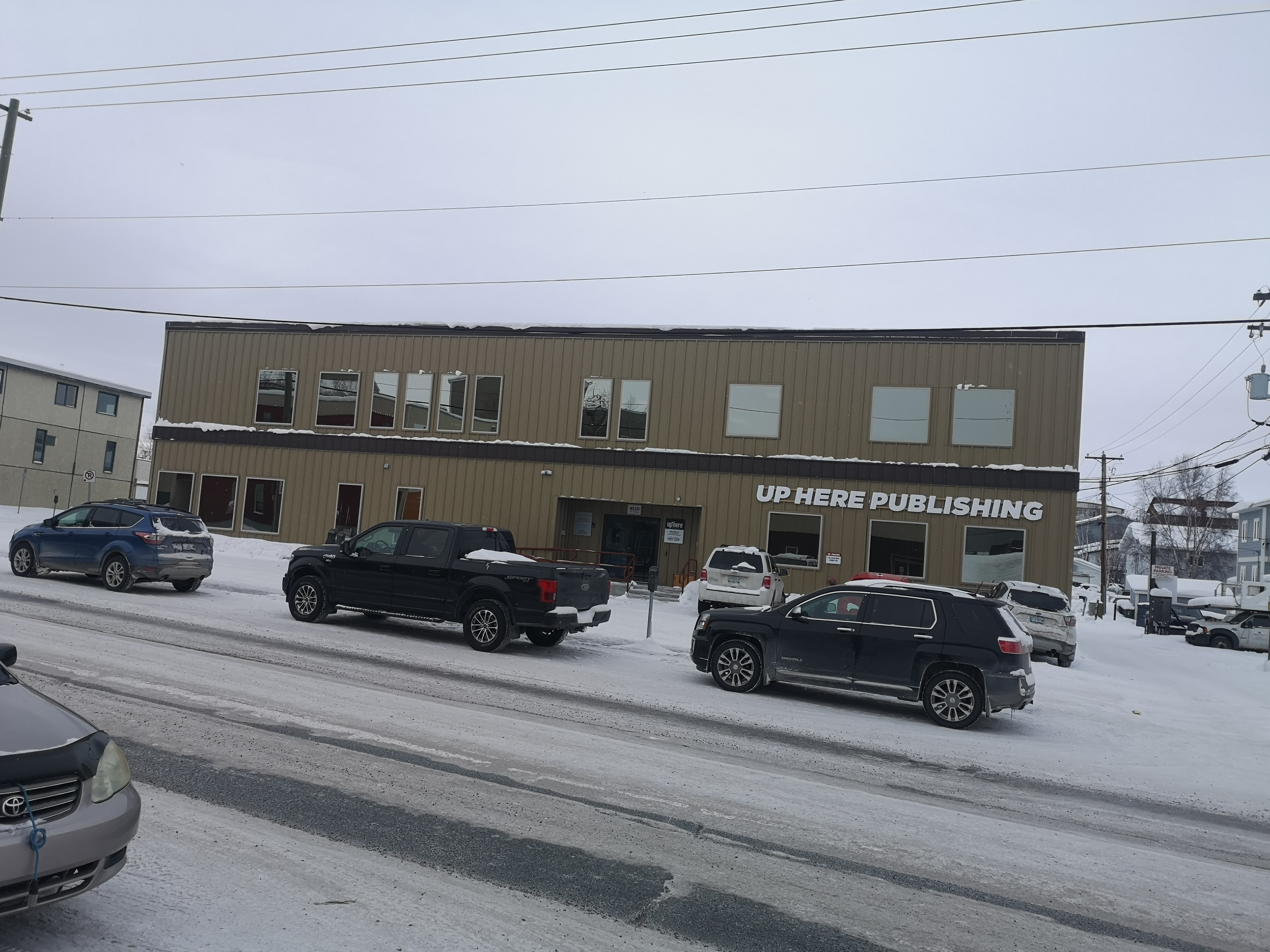
NCS & CKLB Radio 101.9 New location on the 2nd floor

CKLB is a Canadian radio station, broadcasting at 101.9 FM in Yellowknife, Northwest Territories. Owned by the Native Communications Society of the Northwest Territories, the station was licensed in 1985 (originally as CKNM-FM) and broadcasts a community radio format for the territory's First Nations population. The station serves the entire Northwest Territories through a network of rebroadcasters.

CKLB has a number of rebroadcasters operating on low-power FM transmitters throughout Northwest Territories:

Rebroadcasters of CKLB-FM
| City of licence | Identifier | Frequency | Power | Class | RECNet | CRTC Decision |
|---|---|---|---|---|---|---|
| Aklavik | VF2083 | 101.9 FM | 10 watts | VLP | Query | 89-439 |
| Fort Rae | VF2071 | 101.9 FM | 10 watts | VLP | Query | |
| Fort Franklin | VF2069 | 101.9 FM | 10 watts | VLP | Query | |
| Fort Good Hope | VF2070 | 101.9 FM | 10 watts | VLP | Query | |
| Fort Liard | VF2022 | 101.9 FM | 8 watts | LP | Query | 86-499 |
| Fort McPherson | VF2080 | 101.9 FM | 10 watts | VLP | Query | |
| Fort Providence | CHFP-FM | 101.9 FM | 10 watts | VLP | Query | 89-438 |
| Fort Resolution | VF2081 | 101.9 FM | 10 watts | VLP | Query | |
| Fort Simpson | VF2102 | 101.9 FM | 10 watts | VLP | Query | |
| Fort Smith | CHFS-FM | 101.9 FM | 10 watts | VLP | Query | |
| Hay River Reserve | CHRR-FM | 101.9 FM | 10 watts | VLP | Query | |
| Inuvik | VF2082 | 101.9 FM | 10 watts | VLP | Query | |
| Kakisa | VF2020 | 101.9 FM | 7 watts | LP | Query | 86-503 |
| Lutselk'e | VF2026 | 101.9 FM | ? watts | | Query | 86-510 |
| Tsiigehtchic | VF2008 | 101.9 FM | ? watts | | Query | 86-498 |
| Lac La Martre | VF2054 | 101.9 FM | 8 watts | LP | Query | 86-505 |
| Wrigley | VF2025 | 101.9 FM | 8 watts | LP | Query | 86-511 |
| Fort Norman | ? | 101.9 FM | ? watts | | Query | 86-500 |
| Rae Lakes | ? | 101.9 FM | ? watts | | Query | 86-509 |
| Jean Marie River | ? | 101.9 FM | ? watts | | Query | 86-518 |
