= Monotown =

Town economically cetered around a single industry

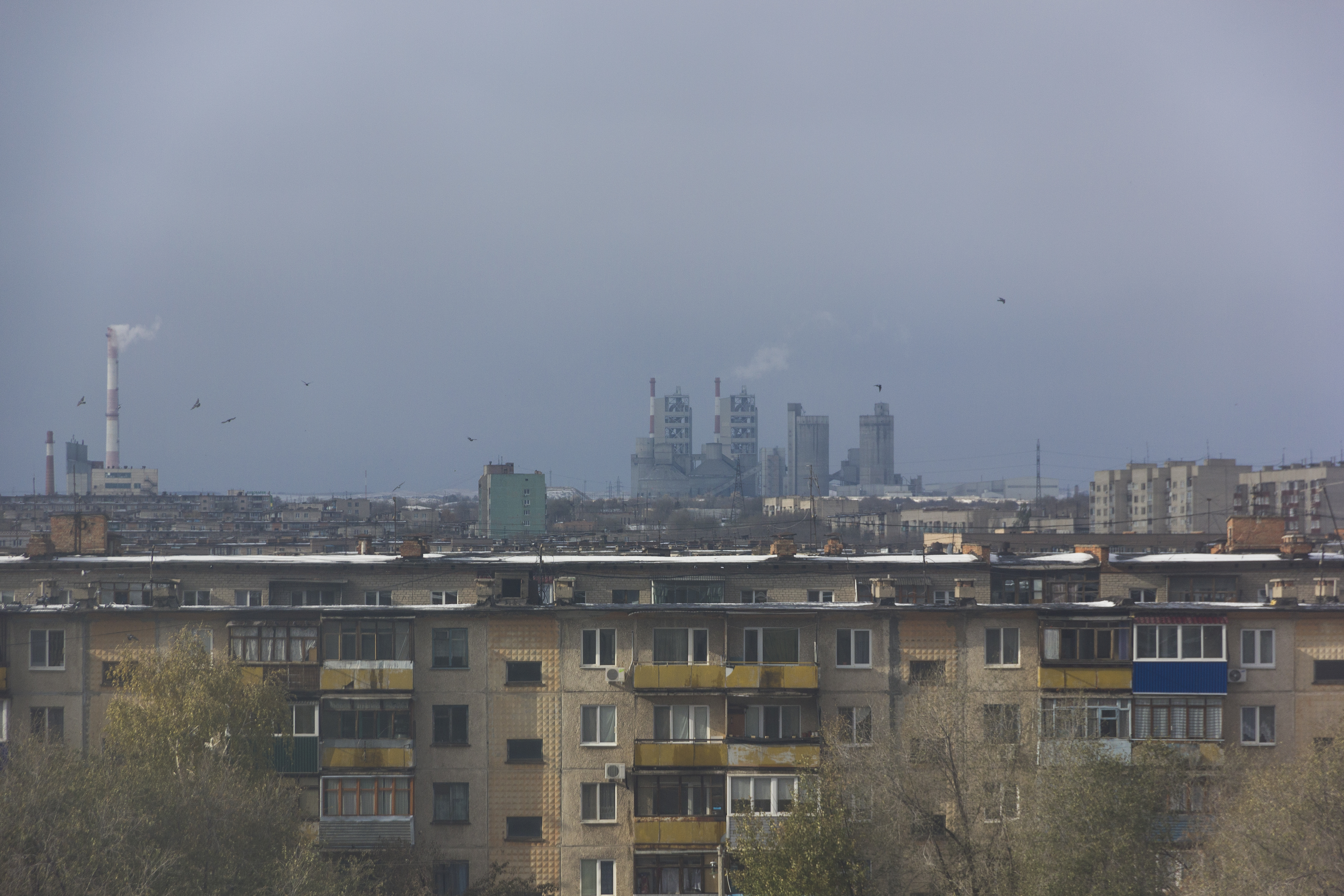
Novotroitsk, a monotown in Orenburg Oblast, Russia

A monotown (a calque from Russian моногород, monogorod) is a city/town whose economy is dominated by a single industry or company. This means that most employment (except for service to residents like schools and shops) is by the main company.

== Russia ==
The term monotown is especially often used in Russia, where the Soviet planned economy created hundreds of monotowns in supposedly rational locations, often in geographically inhospitable areas. The situation in many of Russia's monotowns is highly problematic: they are entirely dependent on the competitiveness of a single company or factory, very inflexible and based on Soviet-era economics and technology.

Most monotowns were built essentially as residential extensions of particular enterprises (so called "city-forming enterprises"), their population being either engaged in the city-forming enterprise's manufacturing process or providing various services to the former group. The core workforce in monotowns was largely formed by the centralized workforce distribution system (people being assigned to an enterprise for a certain number of years after completing their education - which essentially replaced tuition payment, or transferred from other enterprises) rather than by spontaneous migration processes, as was the case in less specialized towns. Combined, these factors led to narrow and inflexible economies and an immobile workforce, by the standards of the market economy newly introduced into the country in the late 1980s or early 1990s.

By the time the city-forming enterprises were privatized and/or liquidated, the workforce management system had already ceased to exist, so the leftover workforce could not be transferred to other regions retaining the living conditions, as it was done during the Soviet era following the liquidation of a no longer needed enterprise. Monotown residents proved to be hesitant to move away on their own and seek work elsewhere as well, mostly because the state housing distribution system was almost dead at the time, and the very low market value of their real estate didn't let them count on minimally comfortable apartments in any other developed town (the agricultural sector was and is even more economically depressed in most regions of Russia, making the countryside largely unattractive for the town-dwellers).

=== History ===
According to a Russian government study conducted in 1999–2000, there were 467 cities and 332 smaller towns in Russia which could be classified as monotowns. The combined population of these towns was 25 million, or a sixth of the country's total population. The 900 monotown enterprises—most of them involved in heavy industries such as manufacturing, fuels, timber, pulp and metallurgy—accounted for more than 30% of industrial production.

The monotowns suffered greatly in the late-2000s recession, leading to mass unemployment in the cities.

In one high-profile incident, in 2009 some 300 residents of the north-western town of Pikalyovo blocked a major highway to protest against large delays in the payments of wages. Prime Minister Vladimir Putin traveled to the city and ordered the owner of the city's dominant company BasEl Cement Pikalyovo, Oleg Deripaska to pay over 41 million rubles ($1.3 million) of wage arrears to the city's residents. The sum was paid out and the situation in the city calmed down, but questions remained about the long-term viability of the Pikalyovo plants.

As of 2018, the official list of Russian monotowns includes 319 populated places. Towns can be removed from the list, if the local economies are deemed to have become sufficiently diversified. In late 2017, 14 million Russians lived in officially designated monotowns. A Fund for the Development of Monotowns was established in 2014, to invest in infrastructure and promote economic diversification. The monotown list is divided into categories, depending on the socioeconomic situation. Monotowns are not necessarily economically stagnant: Norilsk has an above average employment rate, as well as relatively high salaries.

=== Examples ===
Russia's largest monotown is Tolyatti, which has a population of 700,000. It is home to the large AvtoVAZ factory, which in late 2008 employed 106,000 people. AvtoVAZ is Russia's largest carmaker, accounting for 1% of the country's GDP.

Dalnegorsk, located in the Russian Far East, is a monotown with a population of nearly 40,000 people. The town's economy is completely dominated by two mining and metallurgy companies: JSC Bor and JSC Dalpolimetal, both subsidiaries of OOO UK Russian mining company (RGRK). They produce zinc and lead concentrates as well as boric acid colemanite.

== Soviet Union and other post-Soviet states ==
The Soviet planned economy aimed to establish industrial facilities in rational locations, based on military, political, bureaucratic and economic criteria. The goal was to maximise regional specialisation. The dominant enterprise was responsible not only for production, but for providing social services to the population, such as housing, child care, etc.

After the dissolution of the Soviet Union, most of the monotowns' dominant enterprises were privatised, and consequently many of them had gone bankrupt by the end of the 1990s.

Private owners also mostly refused to provide social services to the populations of monotowns, referring to such practice as being "economically inefficient" - however, the government's attempt to delegate the responsibility of providing social services from the companies to the newly created local municipalities was mostly a failure, as they lacked resources to complete the transformation. That led to a radical decrease in quality of life in monotowns, which enjoyed higher-than-average wealth for the most part of the Soviet period.

== See also ==
- Company town
- Mill town
- College town
