= List of schools in the Northwest Territories =

The following is a list of schools in the Northwest Territories, Canada.

== Schools ==
Schools in the Northwest Territories
Community	School name	Governing body	Grades			Principal	Image
Community	School name	Governing body	en	im	fr	Principal	Image
Aklavik	Moose Kerr School	Beaufort Delta Divisional Education Council	JK – 12			Janine Johnson	
Behchokǫ̀	Elizabeth Mackenzie Elementary	Tlicho Community Services Agency	JK – 12			Dianne Lafferty	
Behchokǫ̀	Chief Jimmy Bruneau School	Tlicho Community Services Agency	JK – 6			John Gouthro	
Colville Lake	Colville Lake School	Sahtu Divisional Education Council	JK – 12			Mitchell MacDonald	
Délı̨nę	Ɂehtseo Ayha School	Sahtu Divisional Education Council	JK – 12			Jason Dayman	
Dettah	Kaw Tay Whee School	Yellowknife Education District No. 1	JK – 9			Lea Lamoureux	
Fort Good Hope	Chief T'Selehye School	Sahtu Divisional Education Council	JK – 12			Richard Darrah	
Fort Liard	Echo-Dene School	Dehcho Divisional Education Council	JK – 12			Illonis Hall	
Fort McPherson	Chief Julius School	Beaufort Delta Divisional Education Council	JK – 12			Cliff Gregory	
Fort Providence	Deh Gáh Elementary & Secondary School	Dehcho Divisional Education Council	JK – 12			Lois Philipp	
Fort Resolution	Deninu School	South Slave Divisional Education Council	JK – 12			Justin Heron	
Fort Simpson	Líídlįį Kúę Elementary School	Dehcho Divisional Education Council	JK – 6			Benjamin Adams	
Fort Simpson	Líídlįį Kúę Regional High School	Dehcho Divisional Education Council	7 – 12			Korinne McDonald	
Fort Smith	Joseph Burr Tyrrell Elementary School	South Slave Divisional Education Council	JK – 6	JK – 6		Tiffany Kelly	
Fort Smith	Paul William Kaeser High School	South Slave Divisional Education Council	7 – 12	7 – 10		Christy MacKay	
Gamèti	Jean Wetrade Gamètì School	Tlicho Community Services Agency	JK – 12			Rita Mueller	
Hay River	École Boréale	Commission Scolaire Francophone, Territories du Nord-Ouest			JK – 12	Katrine Lavoie	
Hay River	Harry Camsell School	South Slave Divisional Education Council	JK – 3			Tara Boudreau	
Hay River	Princess Alexandra School	South Slave Divisional Education Council	4 – 7			Tara Boudreau	
Hay River	Diamond Jenness Secondary School	South Slave Divisional Education Council	8 – 12			Lynne Beck	
Inuvik	East Three Elementary School	Beaufort Delta Divisional Education Council	JK – 6	JK – 6		Chauna MacNeil	
Inuvik	East Three Secondary School	Beaufort Delta Divisional Education Council	7 – 12	7 – 9		Adam Wright	
Jean Marie River	Louie Norwegian School	Dehcho Divisional Education Council	JK – 9			Geoff Cook	
Kakisa	Kakisa Lake School	Dehcho Divisional Education Council	JK – 9			Jasna Finlay	
K'atlodeeche First Nation (Hay River Dene Reserve)	Chief Sunrise Education Centre	South Slave Divisional Education Council	JK – 12			Deborah Reid	
Łutselk'e	Lutsel K'e Dene School	South Slave Divisional Education Council	JK – 12			Brendan Mulcahy	
Nahanni Butte	Charles Yohin School	Dehcho Divisional Education Council	JK – 10			Charyl O'Quinn	
Ndilǫ	K'àlemì Dene School	Yellowknife Education District No. 1	JK – 12			Meagan Wowk	
Norman Wells	Mackenzie Mountain School	Sahtu Divisional Education Council	JK – 12			Matthew Zink	
Paulatuk	Angik School	Beaufort Delta Divisional Education Council	JK – 12			Kyle Sagert	
Sachs Harbour	Inualthuyak School	Beaufort Delta Divisional Education Council	JK – 9			Martin MacPherson	
Sambaa K'e	Charles Tetcho School	Dehcho Divisional Education Council	JK – 9			Kristy Nicholls	
Tsiigehtchic	Chief Paul Niditchie School	Beaufort Delta Divisional Education Council	JK – 9			Sonia Gregory	
Tuktoyaktuk	Mangilaluk School	Beaufort Delta Divisional Education Council	JK – 12			Ephraim Warren	
Tulita	Chief Albert Wright School	Sahtu Divisional Education Council	JK – 12			Stephen Slattery	
Ulukhaktok	Helen Kalvak Elihakvik	Beaufort Delta Divisional Education Council	JK – 12			Nicolas Kopot	
Wekweètì	Alexis Arrowmaker School	Tlicho Community Services Agency	JK – 10			Jaspar Wong	
Whatì	Mezi Community School	Tlicho Community Services Agency	JK – 12			Bryce Glendenning	
Wrigley	Chief Julian Yendo School	Dehcho Divisional Education Council	JK – 9			Sylvester Boadi	
Yellowknife	École Allain St-Cyr	Commission scolaire francophone des Territoires du Nord-Ouest			JK – 12	Sylvie Larose	
Yellowknife	École St. Joseph School	Yellowknife Catholic School Board	JK – 7	JK – 7		Paul Kelly	
Yellowknife	Weledeh Catholic School	Yellowknife Catholic School Board	JK – 7	JK – 2		Alicia Larade	
Yellowknife	St. Patrick High School	Yellowknife Catholic School Board	8 – 12	8 – 12		Don Reid	
Yellowknife	École Itłʼǫ (École J.H. Sissons School)	Yellowknife Education District No. 1		JK – 5		Graham Arts	
Yellowknife	N.J. Macpherson School	Yellowknife Education District No. 1	JK – 5			Randy Caines	
Yellowknife	Mildred Hall Elementary School	Yellowknife Education District No. 1	JK – 8			Elizabeth Brace	
Yellowknife	Range Lake North School	Yellowknife Education District No. 1	JK – 8			Yasemin Heyck	
Yellowknife	École William McDonald School	Yellowknife Education District No. 1	6 – 8	6 – 8		Jeff Seabrook	
Yellowknife	Sir John Franklin High School	Yellowknife Education District No. 1	9 – 12	9 – 12		Dean MacInnis	

== Enrolment and graduation ==
Enrolment and graduation from 2003 to 2017
	Enrolment as of 30 September		Graduates											
	Enrolment as of 30 September		Northwest Territories									Canada		
	Enrolment as of 30 September		All			Indigenous			Non-Indigenous			All		
Year	Students	Change	Grads	Rate	% change	Grads	Rate	% change	Grads	Rate	% change	Grads	Rate	% change
2003	9,727	−	283	43.7	−	118	32.2	−	165	58.7	−	307,902	70.9	−
2004	9,608	−1.2%	302	44.9	2.7%	122	34.2	6.2%	180	57.1	−2.7%	286,344	66.1	−6.8%
2005	9,572	−0.4%	354	48.8	8.7%	175	37.0	8.2%	179	71.0	24.3%	288,921	67.5	2.1%
2006	9,324	−2.6%	367	50.7	3.9%	185	39.4	6.5%	182	71.4	0.6%	285,114	66.3	−1.8%
2007	9,048	−3.0%	372	52.8	4.1%	174	39.4	0.0%	198	75.6	5.9%	293,145	65.7	−0.9%
2008	8,762	−3.2%	423	58.0	9.8%	210	46.0	16.8%	213	78.3	3.6%	303,714	65.7	0.0%
2009	8,550	−2.4%	433	55.1	−5.0%	222	44.8	−2.6%	211	72.8	−7.0%	314,196	68.1	3.7%
2010	8,576	0.3%	403	54.8	−0.5%	204	43.0	−4.0%	199	76.0	4.4%	320,619	70.1	2.9%
2011	8,509	−0.8%	396	54.1	−1.3%	185	38.1	−11.4%	211	85.4	12.4%	320,718	70.4	0.4%
2012	8,394	−1.4%	394	55.0	1.7%	205	44.1	15.7%	189	75.0	−12.2%	322,257	70.7	0.4%
2013	8,204	−2.3%	437	63.4	15.3%	235	54.5	23.6%	202	78.3	4.4%	322,815	70.8	0.1%
2014	8,185	−0.2%	463	64.4	1.6%	259	55.2	1.3%	204	81.6	4.2%	318,030	70.8	0.0%
2015	8,268	1.0%	416	66.6	3.4%	239	57.3	3.8%	177	85.1	4.3%	310,629	71.7	1.3%
2016	8,308	0.5%	367	67.5	1.4%	212	61.3	7.0%	155	78.3	−8.0%	309,369	72.6	1.3%
2017	8,194	−1.4%	376	78.0	15.6%	222	69.8	13.9%	154	93.9	19.9%	−	−	

== See also ==
- List of school districts in the Northwest Territories
- Lists of schools in Canada
- Log School House
