= List of school districts in the Northwest Territories =

This is a list of school districts in the Northwest Territories.

Education body	Superintendent	Chair	Communities	School
Beaufort Delta Divisional Education Council	Devin Roberts	Mina McLeod	Aklavik	Moose Kerr School
Beaufort Delta Divisional Education Council	Devin Roberts	Mina McLeod	Fort McPherson	Chief Julius School
Beaufort Delta Divisional Education Council	Devin Roberts	Mina McLeod	Inuvik (Note: Headquarters)	East Three Elementary School
Beaufort Delta Divisional Education Council	Devin Roberts	Mina McLeod	Inuvik	East Three Secondary School
Beaufort Delta Divisional Education Council	Devin Roberts	Mina McLeod	Paulatuk	Angik School
Beaufort Delta Divisional Education Council	Devin Roberts	Mina McLeod	Sachs Harbour	Inualthuyak School
Beaufort Delta Divisional Education Council	Devin Roberts	Mina McLeod	Tsiigehtchic	Chief Paul Niditchie School
Beaufort Delta Divisional Education Council	Devin Roberts	Mina McLeod	Tuktoyaktuk	Mangilaluk School
Beaufort Delta Divisional Education Council	Devin Roberts	Mina McLeod	Ulukhaktok	Helen Kalvak Elihakvik
Commission scolaire francophone, Territories du Nord-Ouest	Yvonne Careen (Note: Directrice générale (Executive Director))	Jean de Dieu Tuyishime (Note: President)	Hay River	École Boréale
Commission scolaire francophone, Territories du Nord-Ouest	Yvonne Careen	Jean de Dieu Tuyishime	Yellowknife	École Allain St-Cyr
Dehcho Divisional Education Council	Philippe Brûlot	Renalyn Pascua-Matt	Fort Liard	Echo-Dene School
Dehcho Divisional Education Council	Philippe Brûlot	Renalyn Pascua-Matt	Fort Providence	Deh Gáh Elementary & Secondary School
Dehcho Divisional Education Council	Philippe Brûlot	Renalyn Pascua-Matt	Fort Simpson	Líídlįį Kúę Elementary School
Dehcho Divisional Education Council	Philippe Brûlot	Renalyn Pascua-Matt	Fort Simpson	Líídlįį Kúę Regional High School
Dehcho Divisional Education Council	Philippe Brûlot	Renalyn Pascua-Matt	Jean Marie River	Louie Norwegian School
Dehcho Divisional Education Council	Philippe Brûlot	Renalyn Pascua-Matt	Kakisa	Kakisa Lake School
Dehcho Divisional Education Council	Philippe Brûlot	Renalyn Pascua-Matt	Nahanni Butte	Charles Yohin School
Dehcho Divisional Education Council	Philippe Brûlot	Renalyn Pascua-Matt	Sambaa K'e	Charles Tetcho School
Dehcho Divisional Education Council	Philippe Brûlot	Renalyn Pascua-Matt	Wrigley	Chief Julian Yendo School
Sahtu Divisional Education Council	Lorraine Kuer	Heather Bourassa	Colville Lake	Colville Lake School
Sahtu Divisional Education Council	Lorraine Kuer	Heather Bourassa	Délı̨nę	Ɂehtseo Ayha School
Sahtu Divisional Education Council	Lorraine Kuer	Heather Bourassa	Fort Good Hope	Chief T'Selehye School
Sahtu Divisional Education Council	Lorraine Kuer	Heather Bourassa	Norman Wells	Mackenzie Mountain School
Sahtu Divisional Education Council	Lorraine Kuer	Heather Bourassa	Tulita	Chief Albert Wright School
South Slave Divisional Education Council	Souhail Soujah	Pennie Pokiak	Fort Resolution	Deninu School
South Slave Divisional Education Council	Souhail Soujah	Pennie Pokiak	Fort Smith	Joseph Burr Tyrrell Elementary School
South Slave Divisional Education Council	Souhail Soujah	Pennie Pokiak	Fort Smith	Paul William Kaeser High School
South Slave Divisional Education Council	Souhail Soujah	Pennie Pokiak	Hay River	Harry Camsell School
South Slave Divisional Education Council	Souhail Soujah	Pennie Pokiak	Hay River	Princess Alexandra School
South Slave Divisional Education Council	Souhail Soujah	Pennie Pokiak	Hay River	Diamond Jenness Secondary School
South Slave Divisional Education Council	Souhail Soujah	Pennie Pokiak	K'atlodeeche First Nation	Chief Sunrise Education Centre
South Slave Divisional Education Council	Souhail Soujah	Pennie Pokiak	Łutselk'e	Lutsel K'e Dene School
Tlicho Community Services Agency	Kevin Armstrong (Note: Chief Executive Officer)	Ted Blondin	Behchokǫ̀	Elizabeth Mackenzie Elementary
Tlicho Community Services Agency	Kevin Armstrong	Ted Blondin	Behchokǫ̀	Chief Jimmy Bruneau School
Tlicho Community Services Agency	Kevin Armstrong	Ted Blondin	Gamèti	Jean Wetrade Gamètì School
Tlicho Community Services Agency	Kevin Armstrong	Ted Blondin	Wekweètì	Alexis Arrowmaker School
Tlicho Community Services Agency	Kevin Armstrong	Ted Blondin	Whatì	Mezi Community School
Yellowknife Education District No. 1	Jameel Aziz	David Wasylciw	Dettah	Kaw Tay Whee School (Note: The Dettah District Education Authority (DEA) is listed separately at the Government of the Northwest Territories site and Charlene Liske as the DEA chair. It is also listed as being part of Yellowknife Education District No. 1.)
Yellowknife Education District No. 1	Jameel Aziz	David Wasylciw	Ndilǫ	K'àlemì Dene School (Note: The Ndilǫ District Education Authority(DEA) is listed separately at the Government of the Northwest Territories site and Sarah Erasmus as the DEA chair. It is also listed as being part of Yellowknife Education District No. 1.)
Yellowknife Education District No. 1	Jameel Aziz	David Wasylciw	Yellowknife	École Itłʼǫ (École J.H. Sissons School)
Yellowknife Education District No. 1	Jameel Aziz	David Wasylciw	Yellowknife	N.J. Macpherson School
Yellowknife Education District No. 1	Jameel Aziz	David Wasylciw	Yellowknife	Mildred Hall Elementary School
Yellowknife Education District No. 1	Jameel Aziz	David Wasylciw	Yellowknife	Range Lake North School
Yellowknife Education District No. 1	Jameel Aziz	David Wasylciw	Yellowknife	École William McDonald School
Yellowknife Education District No. 1	Jameel Aziz	David Wasylciw	Yellowknife	Sir John Franklin High School
Yellowknife Catholic School Board	Simone Gessler	Tina Schauerte	Yellowknife	École St. Joseph School
Yellowknife Catholic School Board	Simone Gessler	Tina Schauerte	Yellowknife	Weledeh Catholic School
Yellowknife Catholic School Board	Simone Gessler	Tina Schauerte	Yellowknife	École St. Patrick High School

There is also a Montessori School in Yellowknife that does not fall under the above school districts.
