= Education in the Northwest Territories =

In Northwest Territories, Canada, education is governed by the Department of Education, Culture and Employment (ECE).

== See also ==
- List of schools in the Northwest Territories
- List of school districts in the Northwest Territories
- Higher education in the Northwest Territories
