= Three feathers =

Three feathers may refer to:

- Three Feathers, a Canadian drama film
- Three Feathers, a novel by Richard Van Camp
- The Three Feathers, a fairy tale by the Brothers Grimm
- Three Feathers Communications, a former Kansas television station

== See also ==
- Prince of Wales's feathers
