= Diamond Jenness Secondary School =

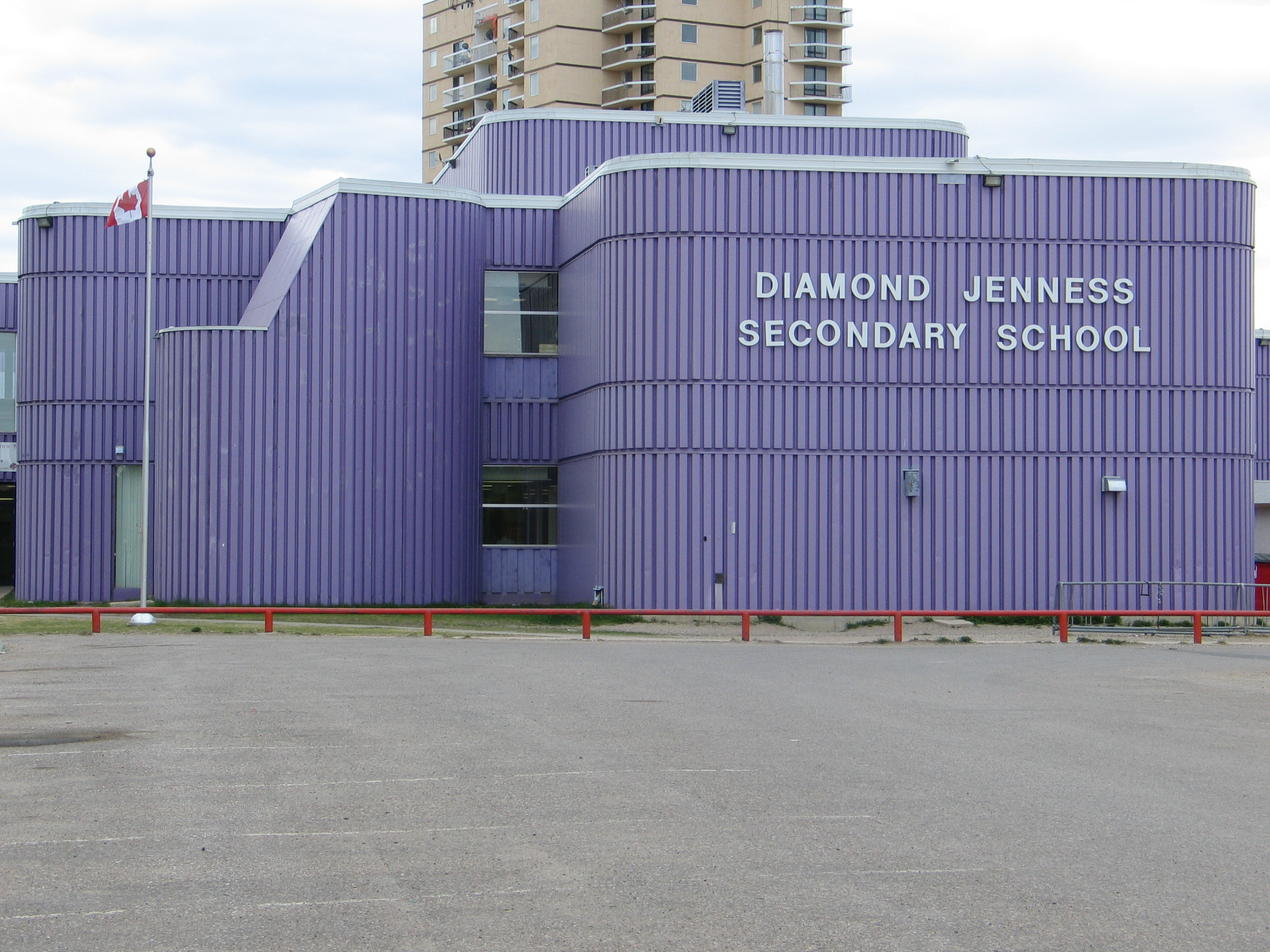

Location
- 58 Woodland Drive; Hay River, Northwest Territories, X0E 0R7; Canada
- Coordinates: 60°48′38″N 115°47′06″W

Information
- Funding type: Public
- Founded: 1973
- School board: Hay River District Education Authority, South Slave DEC
- Superintendent: Souhail Soujah
- Chairperson: Pennie Pokiak (Hay River DEA)
- Principal: Lynne Beck
- Staff: 29
- Grades: 8-12
- Enrollment: 235 (2025)
- Language: English, Slavey, French
- Website: sites.google.com/ssdec.org/djss

Diamond Jenness Secondary School is a high school in Hay River, Northwest Territories, Canada. The school, along with Harry Camsell School and Princess Alexandra School, is overseen by the Hay River District Education Authority.

== Background ==
In 2025 the school had about 235 students and 29 staff overseen by principal Lynne Beck, and vice-principal, Anthony Doiron.

The school's colour is purple and was chosen by the students in a vote. It is located in the South Slave Region and is a part of the South Slave Divisional Education Council, alongside other schools in the communities of Fort Smith, Fort Resolution, Łutselk'e, and Kátlodéhche First Nation (Hay River Reserve).

== History ==
The school, opened in 1973, replaced the old Federal School that had been located on Vale Island. It was designed by Calgary-born Métis / Siksika architect, Douglas Cardinal, who also designed the Canadian Museum of History and the original Edmonton Space and Science Centre.

The school was named in honour of New Zealand born anthropologist, Diamond Jenness, who along with Vilhjalmur Stefansson, spent several years in the Arctic region of the NWT, especially the Coronation Gulf area studying the Copper Inuit.

== Asbestos ==
In February 2008, a substance thought to be asbestos was found below a heating pipe. The school was closed for several days while the material, air samples and some of the insulation were tested. According to a follow-up report by CBC North, the pipe insulation, the air samples and the material did not contain asbestos.

Despite these findings, a report by Northern News Services stated that during the following spring break a work crew had replaced all 300 pipe elbows in the school because officials believed the insulating wrap may have contained asbestos.

== See also ==
- Chief Sunrise Education Centre, located on the nearby K'atl'odeche First Nation (also known as the Hay River Dene Reserve)
