= Princess Alexandra School =

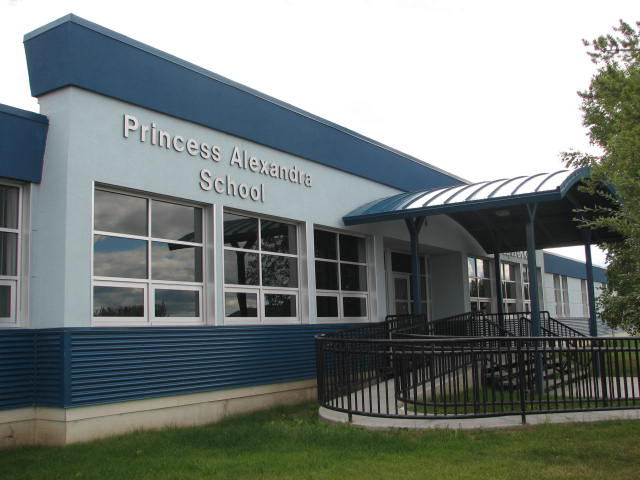

Location
- 56 Woodland Drive; Hay River, Northwest Territories, X0E 0R8; Canada; 60°48′51″N 115°46′57″W

Information
- Funding type: Public
- Established: 1967
- School board: Hay River District Education Authority, South Slave DEC
- Superintendent: Souhail Soujah
- Chairperson: Pennie Pokiak (Hay River DEA)
- Principal: Tara Boudreau
- Grades: 4-7
- Enrollment: 160 (2025)
- Language: English, South Slavey
- Website: www.ssdec.net/princess-alexandra-school

Princess Alexandra School is a school located in Hay River, Northwest Territories, Canada providing public education for students in grades 4 through 7. The administration of the school, along with the Harry Camsell School and Diamond Jenness Secondary School, is the responsibility of the South Slave Divisional Education Council (SSDEC) and is overseen by the Hay River District Education Authority.

== Background ==
The school is named after Princess Alexandra, The Honourable Lady Ogilvy, a cousin to Queen Elizabeth II. The school was officially opened by the royal after its construction was completed in summer 1967.

== Recognition and awards ==
- In August 2012, Princess Alexandra Literacy Coach, Dorie Hanson, was awarded an Excellent in Education Award by the South Slave Divisional Education Council for her work in contributing to the ongoing literacy improvements being experienced at Princess Alexandra and Harry Camsell

== See also ==
- Chief Sunrise Education Centre, located on the K'atl'odeche First Nation (also known as the Hay River Reserve)
