= South Slave Divisional Education Council =

School district in Northwest Territories, Canada

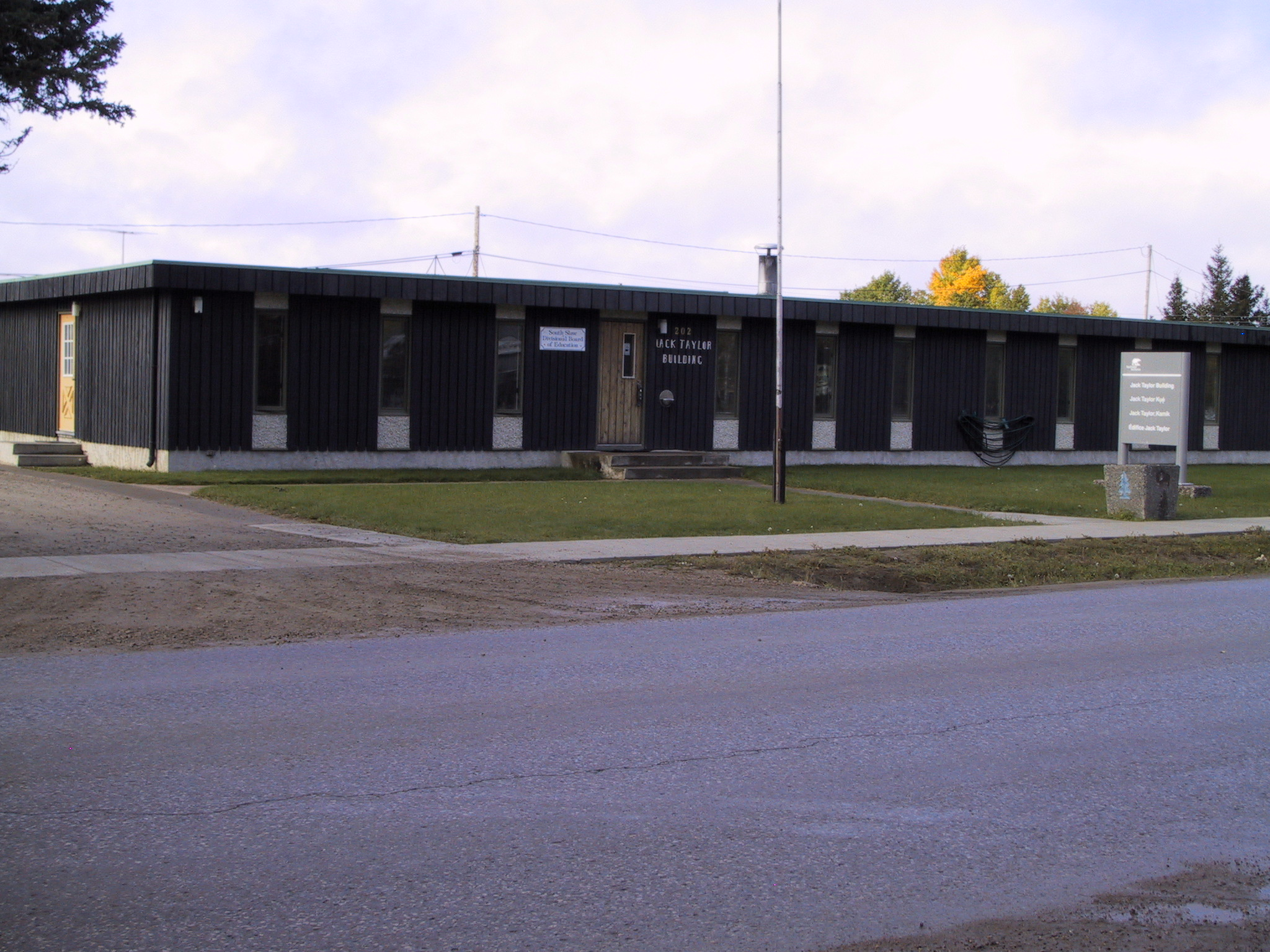
- The Jack Taylor Building

Location
- Fort Smith, Northwest Territories, X0E0P0; Canada
- Coordinates: 60°00′23.23″N 111°53′17.25″W

District information
- Grades: JK-12
- Superintendent: Souhail Soujah
- Asst. superintendent(s): Cora America
- Chair of the board: Pennie Pokiak
- Schools: 8

Students and staff
- Students: 1,300

Other information
- Website: https://www.ssdec.net/

The South Slave Divisional Education Council (SSDEC) is the public school board for the South Slave Region of the Northwest Territories, Canada. Its responsibility includes all schools within the five communities of the South Slave (with the exception of École Boréale in Hay River). Specifically, it is responsible for schools in the communities of Fort Resolution, Fort Smith, K'atl'odeche First Nation, Hay River, and Łutselk'e. Given the vast distances between communities, and the relatively small populations, the eight schools of the South Slave range in enrolment from 60 to 240 students with a total of 1,300. Although considered part of the South Slave Region by other departments of the Government of the Northwest Territories, the communities of Fort Providence and Kakisa are served by the Dehcho Divisional Education Council and not the SSDEC.

== Organizational relationships ==
The South Slave Divisional Education Council (SSDEC) was created in 1991 alongside five local District Education Authorities (DEAs) in each of the major communities of the South Slave Region. These five DEAs are responsible for setting Council goals and priorities, while the SSDEC is responsible for implementing their decisions within the schools. Both the SSDEC and the five community DEAs are granted power by the Government of the Northwest Territories through the Education Act. As of May 2025 the board is made up of chair, Pennie Pokiak (Hay River), Lisa Miersch (Fort Resolution), Crystal McKinnon (Fort Smith), Josie Tourangeau (K'atl'odeche First Nation), and Iris Catholique (Łutselk'e).

== List of schools ==
The following are the schools in the SDEC

Community	School	Grades	Principal	Staff	Students	Notes / References
Fort Resolution	Deninu School	JK – 12	Simone De Gannes Lange		105	
Fort Smith	Joseph Burr Tyrrell Elementary School	JK - 6	Todd Stewart		280	
Fort Smith	Paul William Kaeser High School	7 - 12	Christy MacKay		240	
Hay River	Harry Camsell School	JK - 3	Tara Boudreau		160	
Hay River	Princess Alexandra School	4 - 8	Tara Boudreau		160	
Hay River	Diamond Jenness Secondary School	8 - 12	Lynne Beck		235	
K'atl'odeche First Nation	Chief Sunrise Education Centre	JK – 12	Deborah Reid		60	
Łutselk'e	Łutsel Kʼe Dene School	JK – 12	Karen Gormley		70	

== Communities without schools ==
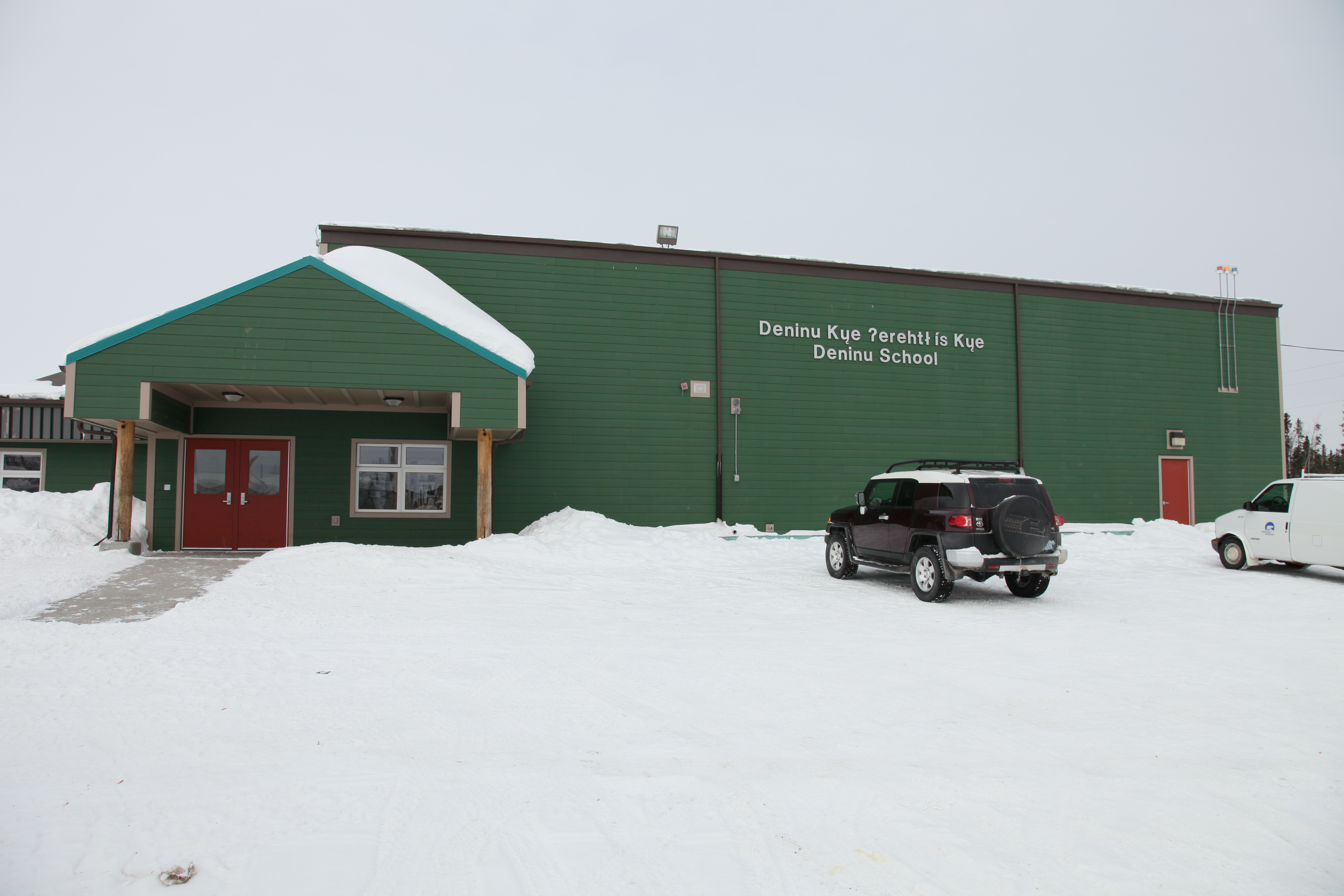
Deninu School in Fort Resolution

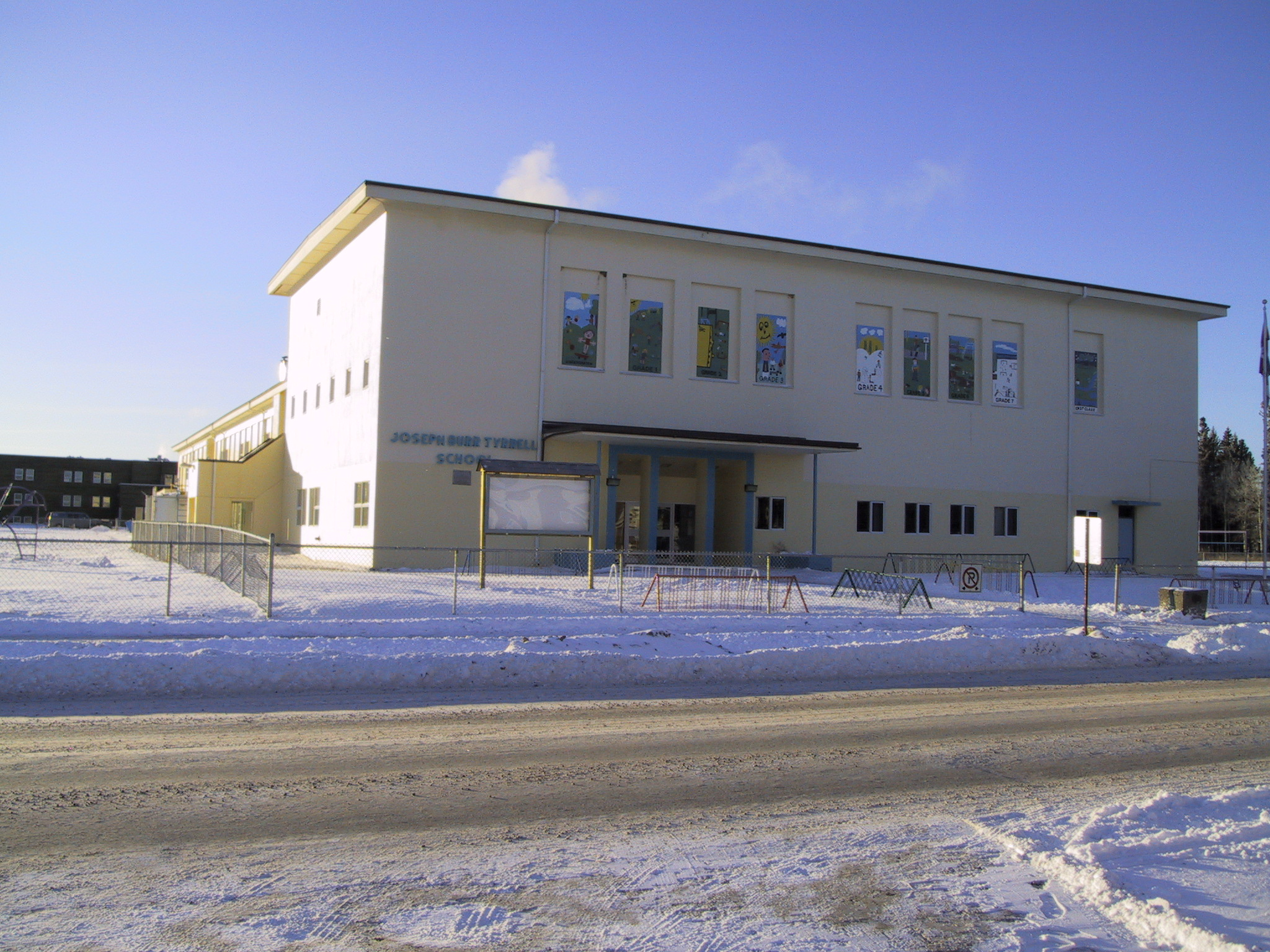
Joseph Burr Tyrrell Elementary School in Fort Smith

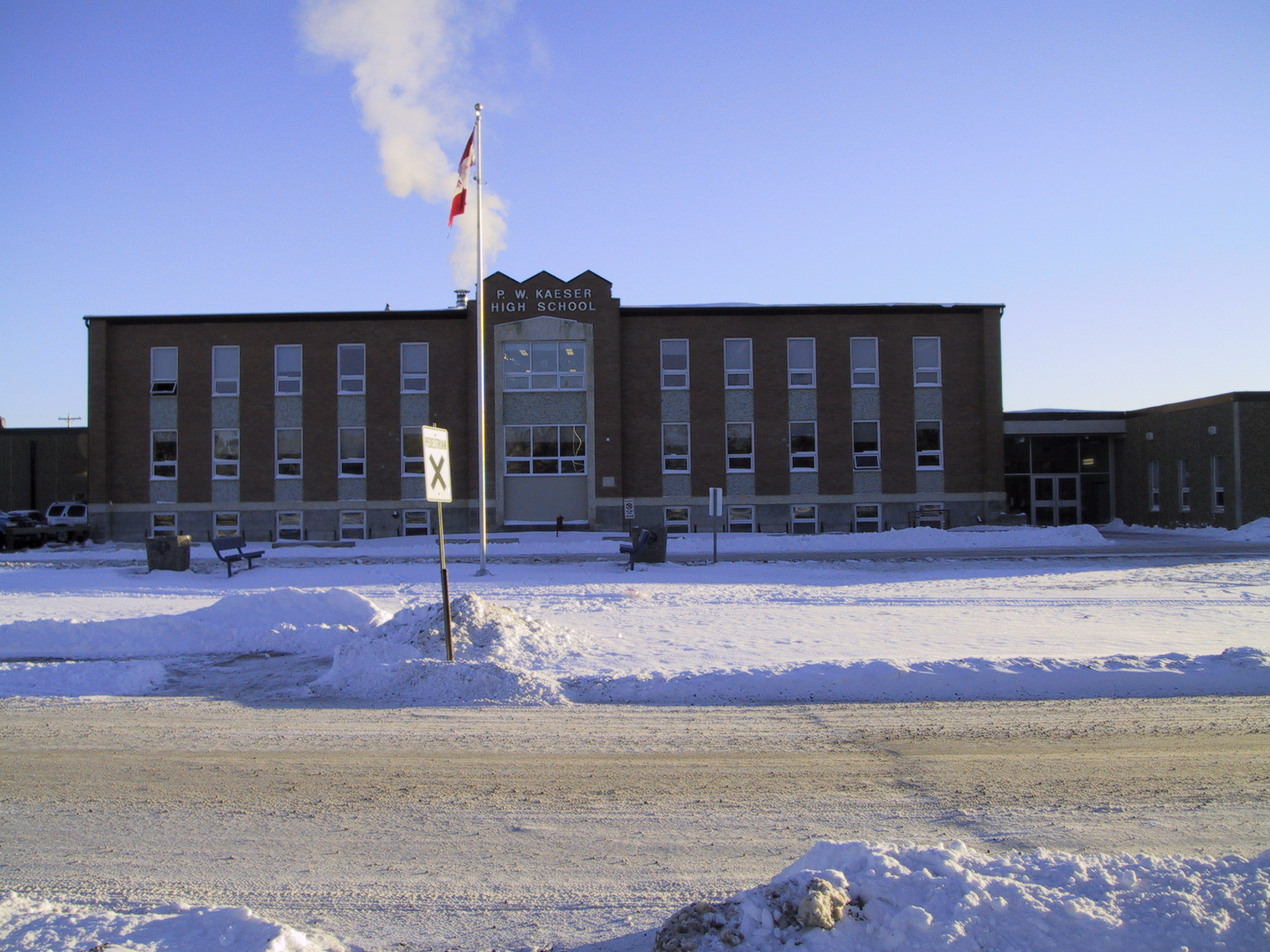
Paul William Kaeser High Schoolin Fort Smith

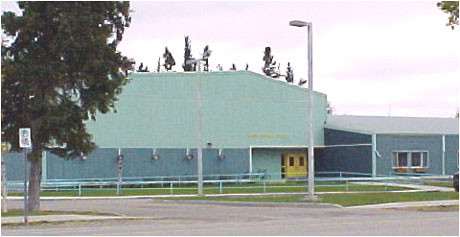
Harry Camsell School in Hay River

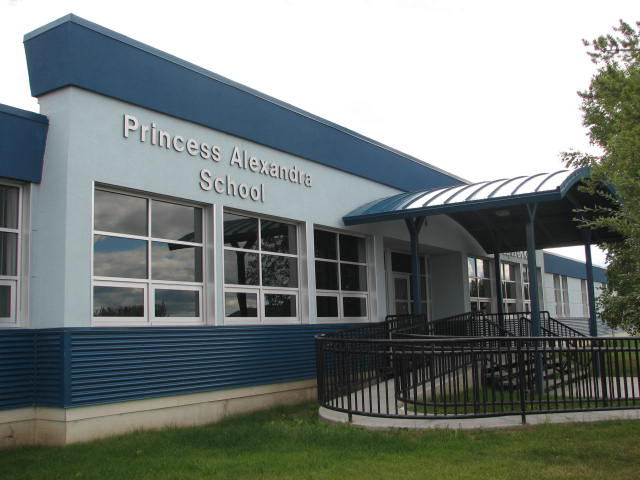
Princess Alexandra School in Hay River

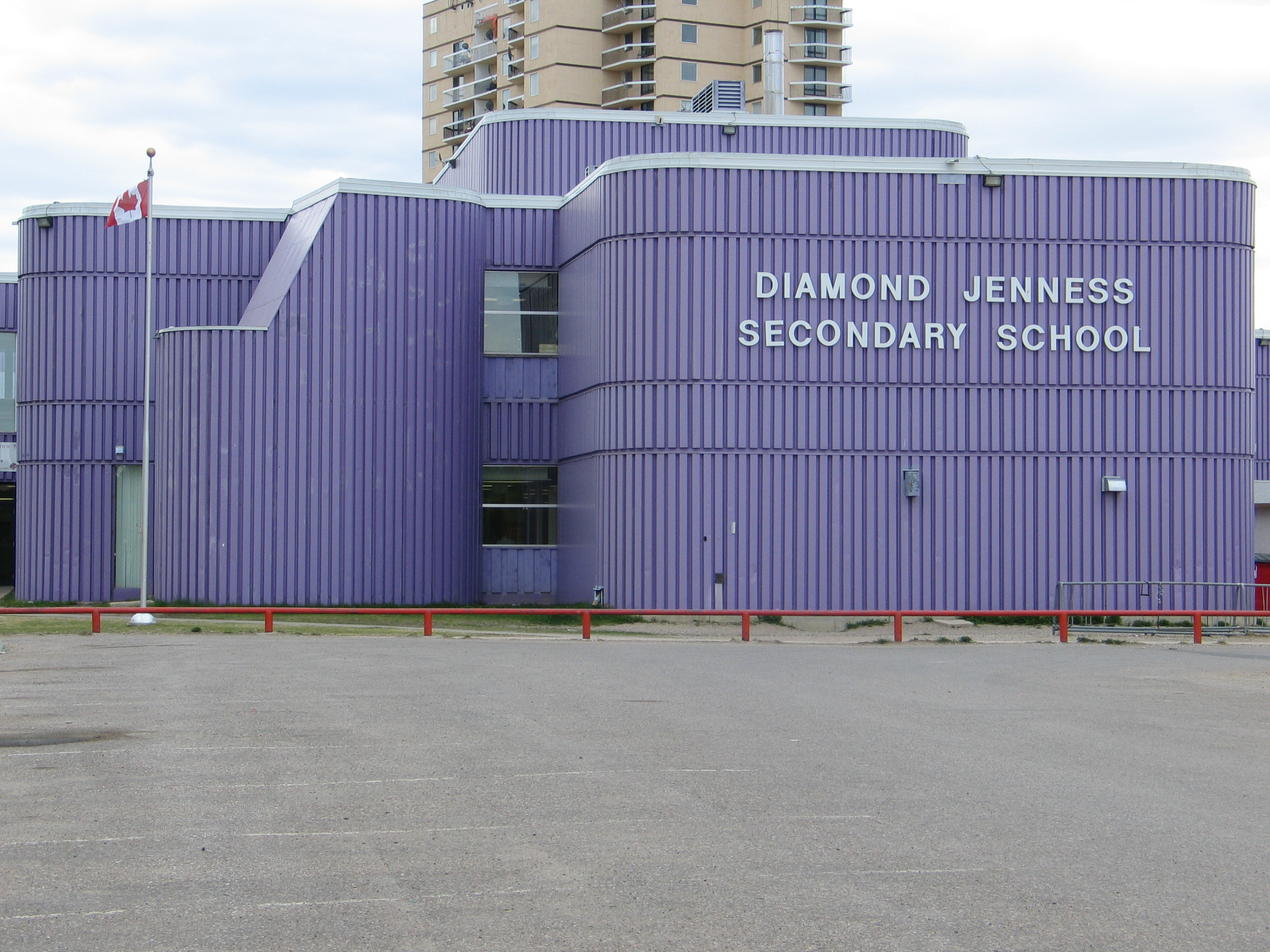
Diamond Jenness Secondary School in Hay River

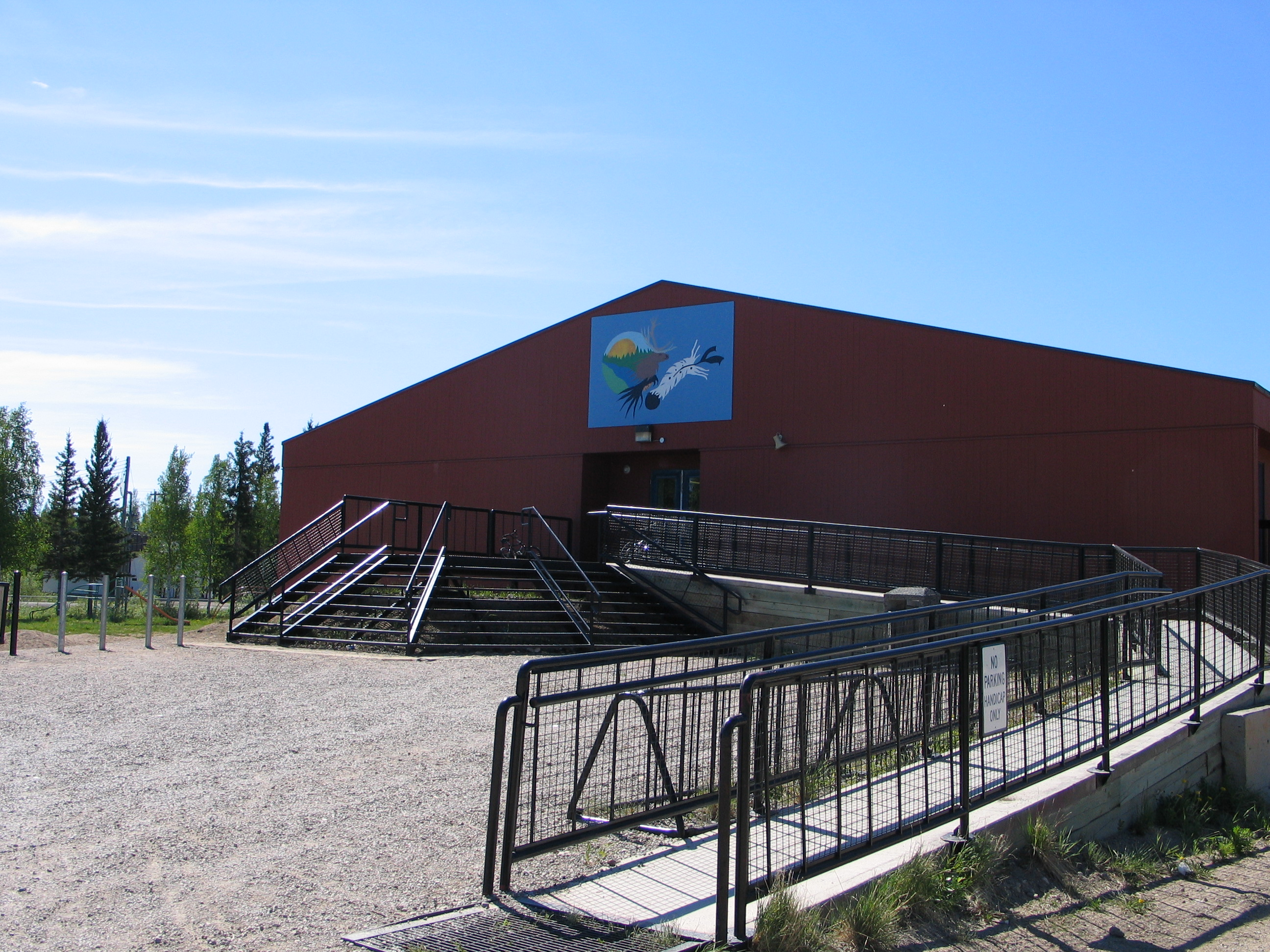
Chief Sunrise Education Centre in K'atl'odeche First Nation

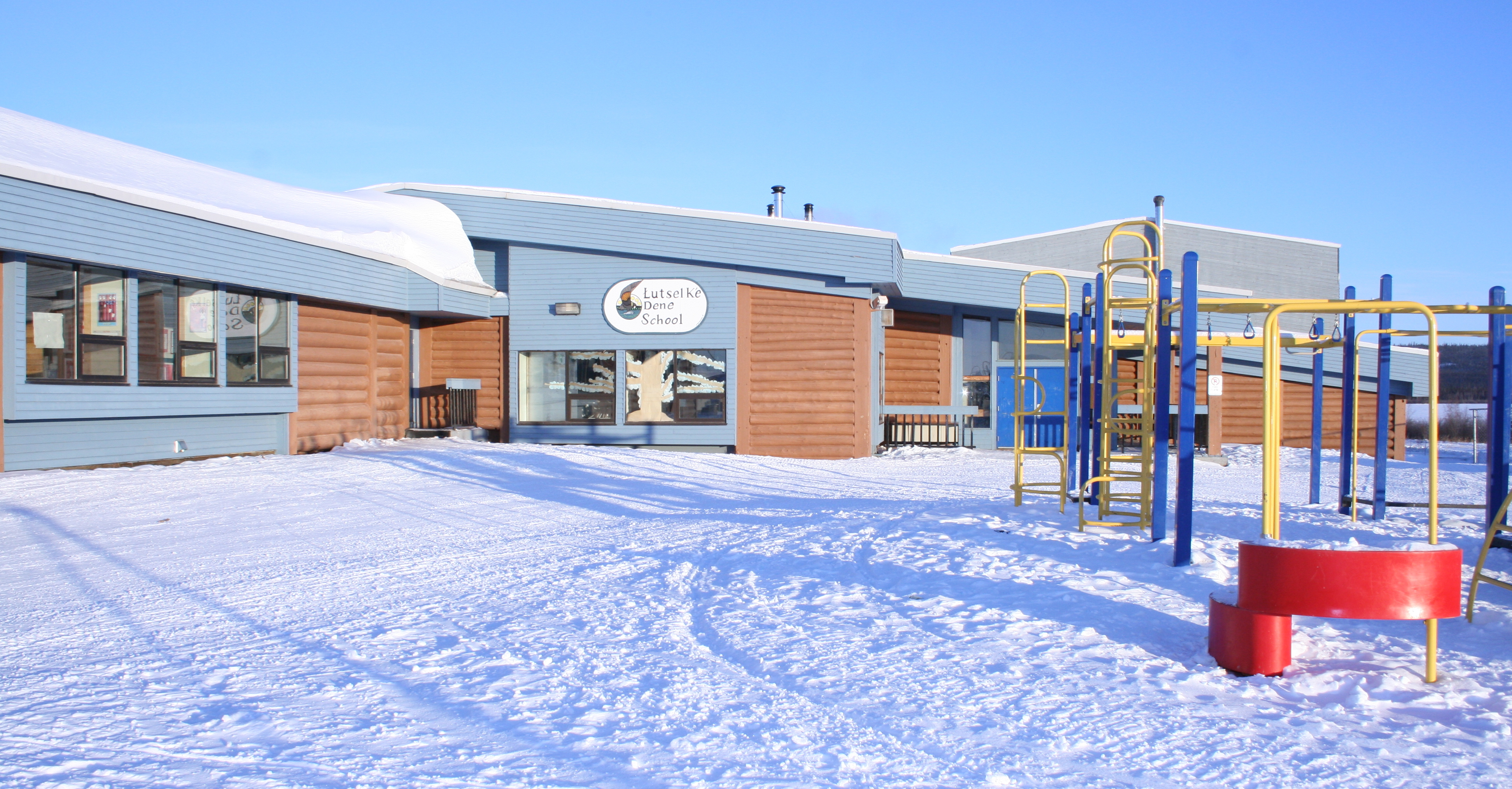
Łutsel Kʼe Dene School in Łutselk'e

While technically within the regional mandate of the SSDEC, the following communities do not host schools for a variety of reasons:

- Enterprise, due to its small population and close proximity to Hay River.

== Leadership for Literacy Initiative ==
In an effort to improve literacy outcomes in the region, the SSDEC began implementation of its Leadership for Literacy initiative in 2007. The initiative placed a Literacy Coach in each of the eight schools in the region, providing job-embedded professional development to teachers and training them on research-based skills and strategies to aid in student achievement. The initiative has also moved away from the summative evaluation of students in favour of more frequent formative evaluations so that "instruction can be tailored to the needs to individual students."

Since its implementation, the initiative has seen literacy scores across the region rise significantly, from "less than 50 per cent" in 2005–2006 to 62 per cent in 2017–2018. The Canadian norm is 77 per cent.

== Indigenous languages ==
The SSDEC is involved with Indigenous language instruction in each of its five communities. According to a report published by the Government of the Northwest Territories, the SSDEC employs 18 Indigenous language instructors who supply over 700 students in the region with daily instruction. Students are instructed in Chipewyan (Dëne Sųłıné Yatıé), Cree (nēhiyawēwin), or South Slavey (Dene Zhatıé), depending on where they live. Typically, students from Hay River and K'atl'odeche First Nation are instructed in South Slavey, while students from Fort Resolution and Łutselk'e are instructed in Chipewyan. Students in Fort Smith receive instruction in both Cree and Chipewyan. Approximately 90% of students in the South Slave have Indigenous heritage. The Council knows that it is important that students have books that represent their language, culture, communities, and people.

Since 2005, the SSDEC has been developing resources for Indigenous language classrooms. The council has now published more than 300 books, most of them dual-language stories in Chipewyan (Dëne Sųłıné Yatıé), Cree (nēhiyawēwin), or South Slavey (Dene Zhatıé) alongside English. The stories are not meant to replace oral stories, but rather preserve stories and create opportunities for the community to become involved in revitalizing culture and language.

Indigenous language instructors began their involvement in publishing following a set of writing workshops in 2005, following which they wrote many Northern-themed and traditional stories. The publishing process is frequently a community effort, involving locals to write, illustrate, translate, and design the books. The council has also worked with established authors like Richard Van Camp and David Bouchard to publish books; and has worked with other school boards and organizations across the country to translate and publish their stories.

=== Three Feathers ===
Three Feathers is a drama film that explores the power and grace of restorative justice and the cultural legacy that can empower future generations. The film was written and directed by Carla Ulrich and is based on the graphic novel Three Feathers^{[1]} by Richard Van Camp^{[2]}. The film, which was produced by the council, premiered in 2018.

The film stars David Burke as Flinch, Joel Evans as Bryce, and Dwight Moses as Rupert; along with Eileen and Henry Beaver as Elders Irene and Raymond. The cast also includes Tantoo Cardinal, Pat Burke, Crystal Benwell, Frankie Laviolette, Dante Kay-Grenier, and Trey Currie.

=== Children's Storybook Contest ===
From 2016 to 2020, the Council held an annual Children's Storybook Contest. The contest encouraged residents of Northwest Territories communities to submit stories with Northern themes that lent themselves to translation and illustration. Winners received a cash prize and had their story published in the three Indigenous languages of the region.

=== First Nations Storybook app ===
The council has also released three First Nations Storybook apps (in each of the three Indigenous languages taught in the region) for iOS and Android devices. The apps display a bookshelf filled with the children's stories that the council has published, and when a book is opened in the app an audio recording of an Elder reading the story plays. While popular with Indigenous language teachers in the region, the app is also available to download for free through the iTunes and Google Play stores. Apps were released in 2014 (Bush Cree), 2016 (Chipewyan), and 2017 (South Slavey).

=== Shopping in Two Worlds program ===
In March 2017, the Council rolled out a program called “Shopping in Two Worlds” in Fort Resolution, Fort Smith, K'atl'odeche First Nation, Hay River, and Łutselk'e grocery stores. Common grocery store item names were translated into the Indigenous language(s) of the community, and then the item name was printed on a label along with a QR code that directed to a voice recording of the word. The program has since spread across Canada, with The North West Company working with Elders, translators, and community members across the country to translate sets of words into approximately 30 different dialects to publish on grocery store labels in the communities the stores serve.

=== Dictionaries ===
In 2008, the Council published a South Slavey-to-English dictionary, developed in partnership with the K’atl’odeeche First Nation. In March 2012, the Council produced, in collaboration with a group of community leaders from Fort Resolution, a Chipewyan-to-English dictionary. In 2013, the Council produced a second Chipewyan-to-English dictionary with the community of Łutselk'e. The 400-page Łutselk'e version includes an additional 1,200 words and images. As dialects vary from community to community, the two Chipewyan dictionaries reflect the language of their respective communities. All dictionaries come with a CD containing clickable words that voice proper pronunciation.

=== Strong Like Two People music video ===
In 2009, the Council produced a music video called “Strong Like Two People.” The song was written by Cree hip hop artist Shawn Bernard (FEENIX) and features students from Fort Smith, Hay River, and Fort Resolution schools. The song won the 2010 Canadian Aboriginal Music Award for “Best Rap/Hip Hop Music Video.”

=== Scramble game ===
Paul Boucher, a Chipewyan teacher in Fort Smith, created a Scrabble-like game called "Ɂëk’éch’a Helá" or "Scramble." The board is labelled in Chipewyan, e.g. "Ta Yati" for "Triple Word Score", and the tiles are labelled not with the letters of the English alphabet but with the grapheme sequences of Chipewyan. For example, there are tiles labelled "ddh" since that sequence represents a single sound in Chipewyan. Following the success of "Chipewyan Scramble," the SSDEC further developed the game to include letter tiles so it could be played in any of the nine official Indigenous language categories of the Northwest Territories.

== Recognition ==
Year	Name	Position	School/DEA	Award	Awarding Body
2019	Shirley Lamalice	Teacher	Princess Alexandra School	Indspire Guiding the Journey Award – Language, Culture & Traditions	Indspire
2018	Kate Powell	Principal	Deninu School	One of Canada's Outstanding Principals	The Learning Partnership
2018	Lois Lafferty	Teacher (retired)	Joseph B. Tyrrell Elementary School	NWT Education Hall of Fame	Department of Education, Culture and Employment
2017	Bess-Ann McKay	SSDEC Vice-chair	SSDEC; Fort Resolution DEA	Community Builder Award	Aboriginal Sport Circle NWT
2017	JBT Jiggers(Lois Lafferty, Karen McFeetors, and Jessica Hval)	Volunteers	Joseph B. Tyrrell Elementary School	Minister's Culture and Heritage Circle Award – Group Category	Department of Education, Culture and Employment
2017	Carolyn Carroll	Principal	Harry Camsell School and Princess Alexandra School	Polar Medal	Governor General of Canada
2017	Pam Walsh	Literacy Coordinator	SSDEC	NWT Ministerial Literacy Champion Award	Department of Education, Culture and Employment
2017	Chuck Lirette	Teacher	Diamond Jenness Secondary School	NWT Education Hall of Fame	Department of Education, Culture and Employment
2017	Lori Rutherford	Teacher	Paul W. Kaeser High School	NWTTA Aboriginal Sport Circle Award	Aboriginal Sport Circle NWT
2017	Paul Boucher	Indigenous Language Teacher	Paul W. Kaeser High School	NWT Premier's Award for Individual Excellence	Government of the Northwest Territories
2017	Anna Cunningham	Program Support Teacher	Diamond Jenness Secondary School	Science Teaching Award for NWT/Nunavut	NWT/Nunavut Association of Professional Engineers and Geoscientists
2017	Carolyn Carroll	Principal	Harry Camsell School and Princess Alexandra School	One of Canada's Outstanding Principals	The Learning Partnership
2016	Alexandra McDonald	Teacher	Paul W. Kaeser High School	Innovation Award	NWT Recreation & Parks
2016	Lynne Beck	Principal	Diamond Jenness Secondary School	Ministerial Restorative Justice Award	Department of Justice
2016	Julie Lys	Fort Smith DEA Chair	Fort Smith DEA	Distinguished Alumni Award	Athabasca University
2016	Leadership for Literacy (L4L)	Initiative	SSDEC	Indigenous Educator Awards - Organization Award	Indspire
2016	Leadership for Literacy (L4L)	Initiative	SSDEC	Canadian Innovators in Education Awards – Third Place	Canadian Education Association and Reader's Digest Canada
2015	Leadership for Literacy (L4L)	Initiative	SSDEC	Ministerial Literacy Award – Organization Award	Department of Education, Culture and Employment
2015	Lutsel K’e Chipewyan Dictionary Committee	Initiative	SSDEC: Łutselk'e	Premier's Award for Collaboration	Government of the Northwest Territories
2015	Doris Camsell	Indigenous Language Teacher	Harry Camsell School and Princess Alexandra School	NWT Education Hall of Fame	Department of Education, Culture and Employment
2015	Bruce Green	Teacher (retired)	Diamond Jenness Secondary School	NWT Education Hall of Fame	Department of Education, Culture and Employment
2015	Deninu School	Students	Deninu School	Ministerial Literacy Award	Department of Education, Culture and Employment
2014	Brent Kaulback	Assistant Superintendent	SSDEC	Canadian Superintendent of the Year	Canadian Association of School System Administrators
2014	Celine Marlowe	Indigenous Language Teacher	Łutsel Kʼe Dene School	NWT Education Hall of Fame	Department of Education, Culture and Employment
2014	Leadership for Literacy (L4L)	Initiative	SSDEC	Gold – Public Sector Leadership Award – Education	Institute of Public Administration of Canada / Deloitte
2013	Angie Fabian	Indigenous Language Teacher	Deninu School	Prime Minister's Award for Teaching Excellence	Government of Canada
2013	Jill Taylor	Inclusive Schooling Coordinator	SSDEC	NWT Recreation Parks Association Award	NWT Recreation Parks Association
2013	Dan Summers	Principal	Deninu School	One of Canada's Outstanding Principals	The Learning Partnership
2013	Doris Camsell	Indigenous Language Teacher	Harry Camsell School	Indspire Indigenous Educator Award – Language, Culture and Traditions	Indspire
2013	Brent Kaulback	Assistant Superintendent	SSDEC	Indspire Indigenous Education Partner Award	Indspire
2013	Ann Pischinger	SSDEC Chairperson	SSDEC; Fort Smith DEA	Queen Elizabeth II Diamond Jubilee Medal	Government of Canada
2013	Bess-Ann McKay	SSDEC Vice-chair	SSDEC; Fort Resolution DEA	Queen Elizabeth II Diamond Jubilee Medal	Government of Canada
2013	Jill Taylor	Inclusive Schooling Coordinator	SSDEC	Queen Elizabeth II Diamond Jubilee Medal	Government of Canada
2013	Jill Taylor	Inclusive Schooling Coordinator	SSDEC	NWT Education Hall of Fame	Department of Education, Culture and Employment
2013	Chuck Lirette	Teacher	Diamond Jenness Secondary School	Dennis Crane Memorial Official of the Year	Sport North Federation
2012	Dr. Curtis Brown	Superintendent	SSDEC	NWT Education Hall of Fame (Minister's Choice Award)	Department of Education, Culture and Employment
2012	Dan Summers, Kate Powell, Lucinda Summers, Angie Fabian	Staff	Deninu School	Premier's Award for Excellence	Government of the Northwest Territories
2012	Kate Powell & Lucinda Summers	Staff	Deninu School	Ministerial Literacy Award	Department of Education, Culture and Employment
2012	Al Karasiuk	Principal	Paul W. Kaeser High School	One of Canada's Outstanding Principals	The Learning Partnership
2011	Leadership for Literacy (L4L)	Initiative	SSDEC	Round Table with His Excellency the Right Honourable Governor General David Johnston - moderated by Dr. Curtis Brown	Government of Canada
2011	Dr. Curtis Brown	Superintendent	SSDEC	Canadian Superintendent of the Year	Canadian Association of School System Administrators
2011	Dorothy Beaulieu	Teacher		NWT Education Hall of Fame	Department of Education, Culture and Employment
2010	Brent Kaulback	Assistant Superintendent	SSDEC	Canadian Aboriginal Music Award (Producer) – Hip Hop	Indigenous Music Awards
2010	Brent Kaulback	Assistant Superintendent	SSDEC	NWT Education Hall of Fame (inaugural inductee)	Department of Education, Culture and Employment
2008	Moh Odeen	Principal	Deninu School	One of Canada's Outstanding Principals	The Learning Partnership
