= Tłı̨chǫ Community Services Agency =

School district in Northwest Territories, Canada

Address
- Bag Service #5 North Slave Region Behchokǫ̀, Northwest Territories, X0E 0Y0; Canada

District information
- Type: Public
- Grades: JK-12
- Chief Executive Officer: Kevin Armstrong
- School board: 5 members
- Chair of the board: Ted Blondin

Other information
- Director of Education: Linsey Hope
- Website: tlichocommunityservicesagency.ca

The Tłı̨chǫ Community Services Agency is the public school board, as well as overseeing health and social services for the North Slave Region communities that are part of the Tłı̨chǫ Government. Located in Behchokǫ̀ the education council represents five schools in four communities.

The board, which is responsible for health, social services, and education for the region is made up of five members, one from each community and a chair.

Excluded are the schools in Dettah, Ndilǫ, and Yellowknife which are in Yellowknife Education District No. 1.

== Language ==
The main language of instruction is English. However, Tłı̨chǫ or Tłı̨chǫ Yatıì is also taught in schools and is an important part of the culture.

== List of schools ==
The following are the schools in the TCSA

Community	School	Grades	Principal	Staff	Students	Notes / references
Behchokǫ̀	Elizabeth Mackenzie Elementary	JK – 6	John Gouthro			Named for Elder and educator Elizabeth Mackenzie. She signed the Tłįchǫ Agreement that led to the Tłı̨chǫ Government
Behchokǫ̀	Chief Jimmy Bruneau School	JK – 12	Dianne Lafferty			Named for Chief Jimmy Bruneau who signed Treaty 11.
Gamèti	Jean Wetrade Gamètì School	JK – 12	Rita Mueller			Named for Jean Wetrade, who settled in the Rae Lakes (now Gamèti) area in the 1960s.
Wekweètì	Alexis Arrowmaker School	JK – 10	Jaspar Wong			Named for Chief Alexis Arrowmaker who was a child when Treaty 11 was signed.
Whatì	Mezi Community School	JK – 12	Bryce Glendenning			Named for Elder Mezi Beaulieu, founder of what is now Whatì
