= Łutsel Kʼe Dene School =

Łutsel K’e Dene School
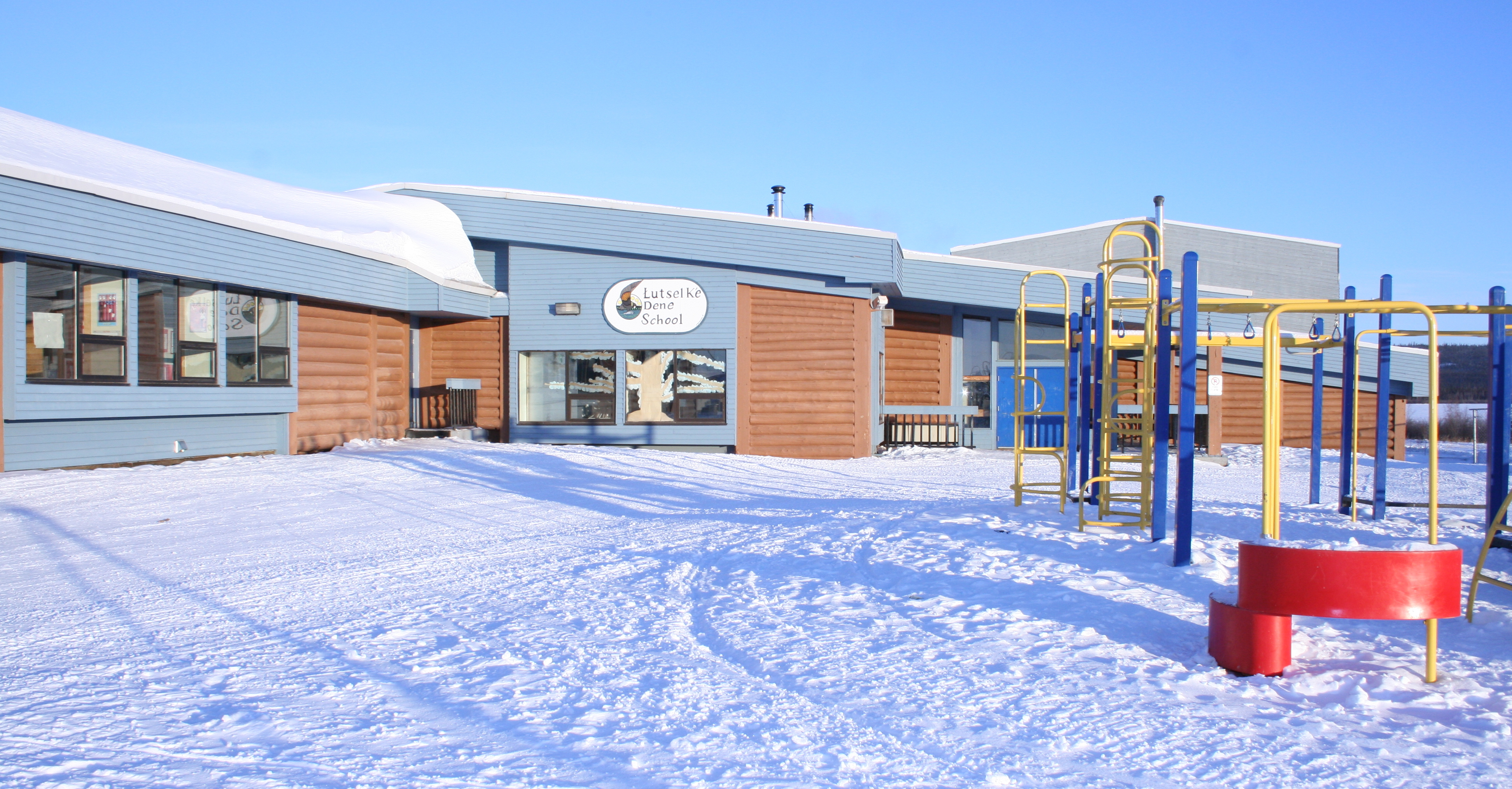

Location
- Łutselk'e, Northwest Territories, X0E 1A0; Canada
- Coordinates: 62°24′18″N 110°44′06″W

Information
- Funding type: Public
- Established: 1960
- School board: Łutsel K’e District Education Authority, South Slave DEC
- Superintendent: Souhail Soujah
- Chairperson: Iris Catholique (Łutsel K'e DEA)
- Principal: Karen Gormley
- Grades: JK-12
- Enrollment: 70 (2020-2021)
- Language: English, Chipewyan
- Website: www.ssdec.net/lutsel-k-e-dene-school

Łutsel K’e Dene School is a JK-12 public school located in Łutselk'e, Northwest Territories, Canada. The school is the only public education option for youth in the settlement and serves approximately 70 students. The administration of the school is the responsibility of the South Slave Divisional Education Council (SSDEC).

== Background ==
The Łutsel K’e Dene School has existed in various forms since 1960.

In 2011, the South Slave Divisional Education Council, on the recommendation of the Łutsel K’e District Education Authority, expanded the program at the school to include grades 11 and 12. Previously, students wishing to finish their high school education were required to attend classes in Fort Smith at Paul William Kaeser High School as a part of either regular boarding programs or the Western Arctic Leadership Program.

According to the school website hosted by the SSDEC the school places "...a high value on the promotion of respect, self-worth, community, and education from both the Dene and Western perspectives."

== Dene Kede ==
The school makes extensive use of Dene Kede, a curriculum developed in the Northwest Territories, designed specifically for use in small Dene communities such as Łutselk'e. The goal of the curriculum is to develop "capable Dene," with a strong focus on developing strong student relationships with the spiritual world, the land, other people, and themselves. Compared with their peers elsewhere in Canada, students in Łutsel K’e spend more significant amounts of educational time on the land and learning about their cultural heritage.

== Recognition ==
In 2012, the staff of Łutsel K’e Dene School received praise from Governor General David Johnston for their work in improving learning outcomes at the school. As he notes in the referenced video, following the implementation of the South Slave Divisional Education Council's Leadership for Literacy initiative, the number of students scoring at or above the Canadian national standard went from 30 percent in 2006 to above 70 percent in 2012.
