= Three Feathers =

- Directed by: Carla Ulrich
- Written by: Carla Ulrich
- Based on: Three Feathers by Richard Van Camp
- Produced by: Richard Van Camp; Brent Kaulback; Ann LePine
- Starring: David Burke; Joel Evans; Dwight Moses; Eileen Beaver; Henry Beaver
- Distributed by: South Slave Divisional Education Council
- Release date: 2018
- Country: Canada
- Languages: English; Chipewyn; Cree; South Slavey

Three Feathers is a Canadian drama film. The film was written and directed by Carla Ulrich and is based on the novel Three Feathers by Richard Van Camp.

The film stars David Burke as Flinch, Joel Evans as Bryce, and Dwight Moses as Rupert; along with Eileen and Henry Beaver as Elders Irene and Raymond. The cast also includes Tantoo Cardinal, Pat Burke, Crystal Benwell, Frankie Laviolette, Dante Kay-Grenier, and Trey Currie.

== Plot ==
The film follows the journey of three young Dene men from the Northwest Territories after they commit a crime and are sentenced.

Flinch, Bryce, and Rupert were on a robbing spree in their hometown until one night when everything went wrong and they caused serious injuries to a respected Elder. Their community is angry and demands justice, but instead of being sent away to jail, they young men are sentenced through a traditional sentencing circle.

They are sent live on the land with two Elders, Irene and Raymond, for nine months, where they must learn how to take care of the land and how to take care of each other. In the beginning the men rebel, but they soon come to see the value in the teachings they receive from the Elders and the land.

The Elders share their teachings, gently guiding the young men to become responsible and competent. They show them how to learn from the land and help them reconnect with their traditional language and cultural traditions. Indigenous values of respect, kindness, and sharing underlie everything they do.

After spending nearly a year on the land, Flinch, Bryce, and Rupert return to their community, hopeful that their apology and their changed ways will be enough to right the harm they caused. But will the community accept them and forgive them?

Three Feathers: The Movie explores the power and grace of restorative justice and the cultural legacy that can empower future generations.

== Filming ==
As the film takes place over nine months, it features scenes of life on the land throughout all four seasons. In each season, the three young men have the opportunity to learn new lessons—from snowshoeing through deep snow in the winter to setting up a tipi in the summer.

== Cast ==
The majority of the cast and crew are residents of the Northwest Territories.

- David Burke as Flinch
- Joel Evans as Bryce
- Dwight Moses as Rupert
- Eileen Beaver as Irene
- Henry Beaver as Raymond
- Tantoo Cardinal as Flinch's Grandmother
- Pat Burke as Gabe
- Crystal Benwell as Gabe's Daughter
- Frankie Laviolette as Young Flinch
- Dante Kay-Grenier as Young Bryce
- Trey Currie as Young Rupert
- Tristan MacPherson as Young Bryce's Brother
- Grant Paziuk as the Judge
- Peter Lusty as the Lawyer
- Kim Lusty as Social Worker 1
- Cynthia Cardinal as Social Worker 2
- Larissa Lusty as Rupert's Girlfriend
- Ronnie Schaefer as Paramedic 1
- Lucy Tulugarjuk as Paramedic 2
- Gordie Rothney as Police Officer 1
- Krystal Brown as Police Officer 2
- Stephen Beaver as Young Rupert's Dad
- Melissa Fraser as Young Rupert's Mom
- Robert Grandjambe as the Dog Musher

== Accolades ==
Three Feathers: The Movie is the first film to be produced in four languages: Chipewyan (Dëne Sųłıné Yatıé), Cree (Nēhiyawēwin), South Slavey (Dene Zhatıé), and English.
