= Beaufort Delta Divisional Education Council =

School district in Northwest Territories, Canada

Address
- Bag Service #12 Inuvik Region Inuvik, Northwest Territories, X0E 0T0; Canada
- Coordinates: 68°21′29.5″N 133°43′32.6″W

District information
- Type: Public
- Motto: Capable Citizens Through Indigenized Education
- Grades: JK-12
- Superintendent: Devin Roberts
- Asst. superintendent(s): Chauna McNeil & Krista Cudmore
- School board: 10 members
- Chair of the board: Mina McLeod
- Schools: 9

Students and staff
- Students: 1,508
- Staff: 328

Other information
- Website: https://beaufortdeltadec.ca/

The Beaufort Delta Divisional Education Council or Beaufort-Delta Divisional Education Council is the public school board for the Inuvik Region, identical to Region 1, a census division in the Northwest Territories. Located in Inuvik the education council represents nine schools in eight communities.

The board is made up of ten members, one from each District Education Authority (DEA), and one each from the Gwich'in Tribal Council and the Inuvialuit Regional Corporation. The executive is made up of a chair, as of 2024 it is Mina McLeod from Aklavik, a vice-chair and one other member.

== School population ==
School programs in the Northwest Territories (NWT) are mandatory to all people between the age of six and sixteen. The BDDBE says that they serve over 1,500 students and have 328 staff.

Like other divisional education councils in the NWT they are inclusive

Region 1 is predominately Indigenous peoples, made up of Inuvialuit (Inuit), Gwichʼin (First Nations), and Métis, and these numbers will be reflected in the school population.

== Languages ==
The main language of instruction throughout the region is English and French immersion is available in both Inuvik schools. Indigenous languages, such as Gwichʼin and Inuvialuktun (Inuinnaqtun), are taught depending on the community.

== List of schools ==
The following are the schools in the BDDEC

Community	School	Grades	Principal	Staff	Students	Notes / References
Aklavik	Moose Kerr School	JK – 12	Colin Rose	35	125	Named for Arnold J. (Moose) Kerr, a former teacher.
Fort McPherson	Chief Julius School	JK – 12	Anne Payne	30	<100 (2019)	Named for Chief Julius Salu who signed Treaty 11
Inuvik (Note: Headquarters)	East Three Elementary School	JK – 6	Sonia Gregory	60	420	
Inuvik	East Three Secondary School	7 – 12	Adam Wright	52	300	Named for East Branch, Site 3, a survey section that helped determine the location of Inuvik
Paulatuk	Angik School	JK – 12	Kyle Sagert	10	70 (2022)	Named for Angik Rubin, a Paulatuk Elder
Sachs Harbour	Inualthuyak School	JK – 9	David Egert	4		Named for Inualthuyak, an Elder from Sachs Harbour
Tsiigehtchic	Chief Paul Niditchie School	JK – 9	Horace Palmer	10	33 (2017)	Named for Chief Paul Niditchie who signed Treaty 11
Tuktoyaktuk	Mangilaluk School	JK – 12	Ephraim Warren	34	240	Named for Mangilaluk who founded Tuktoyaktuk
Ulukhaktok	Helen Kalvak Elihakvik	JK – 12	Nicolas Kopot	27		Named for local artist Helen Kalvak
