= Joseph Burr Tyrrell Elementary School =

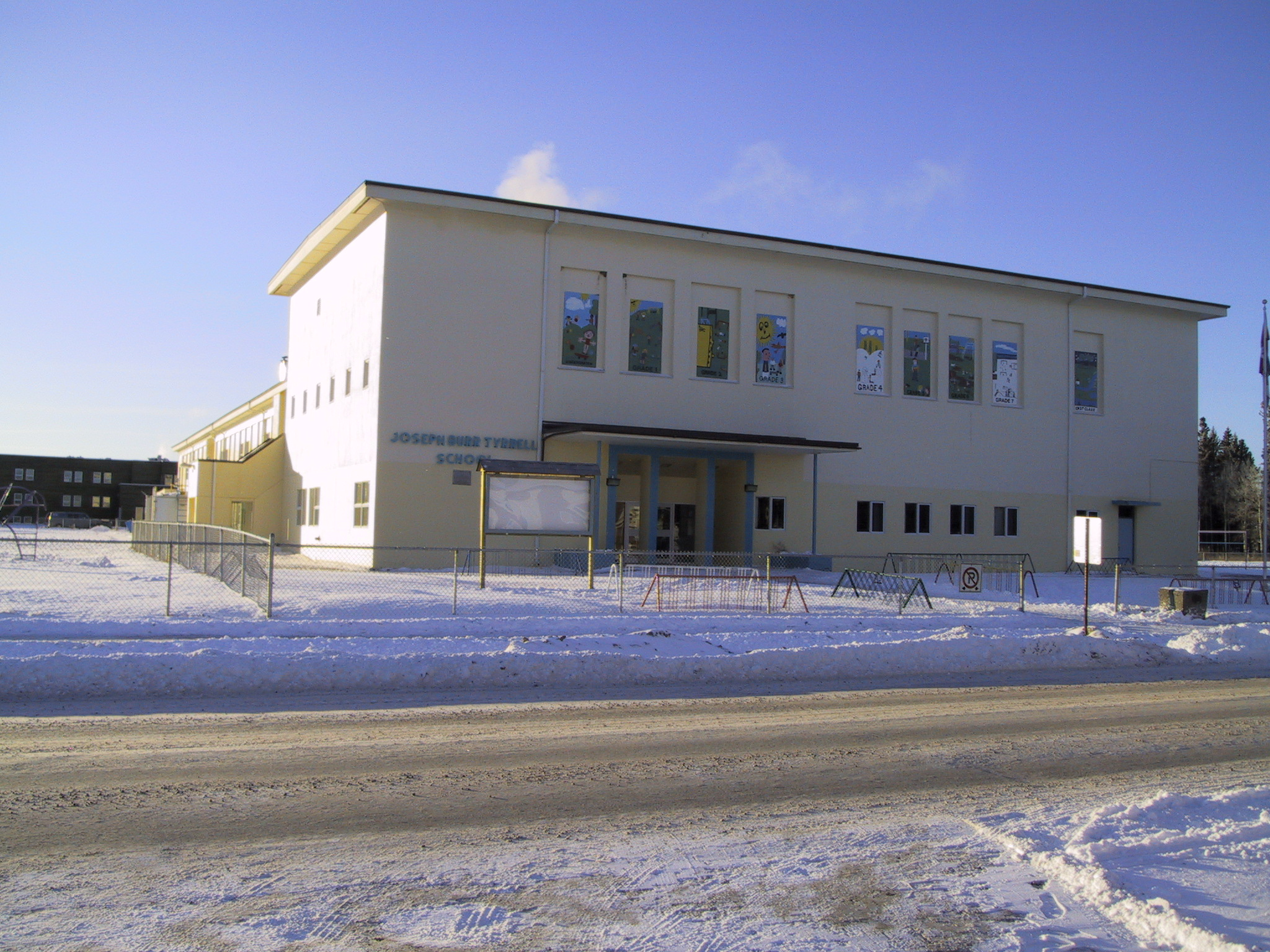

Location
- 232 McDougal Road; Fort Smith, Northwest Territories, X0E 0P0; Canada
- 60°00′26″N 111°53′31″W

Information
- Funding type: Public
- School board: Fort Smith District Education Authority, South Slave DEC
- Superintendent: Souhail Soujah
- Chairperson: Connie Benwell (Fort Smith DEA)
- Principal: Todd Stewart
- Staff: 40
- Grades: JK-6
- Enrollment: 280 (2025)
- Language: English, French, Chipewyan
- Website: www.ssdec.net/joseph-b-tyrrell-elementary-school

Joseph Burr Tyrrell Elementary School is an elementary school in Fort Smith, Northwest Territories, Canada, and is named for the explorer Joseph Tyrrell. The school, along with the Paul William Kaeser High School, is overseen by the Fort Smith District Education Authority and administered by the South Slave Divisional Education Council. It provides elementary education services to students from Fort Smith as well as the nearby Salt River First Nation and Smith's Landing First Nation.

== Background ==
As of 2025, the school had 280 students and 20 staff members. The number of students tends to shift significantly from year to year because of the large number of students from outside the community whose parents attend nearby Aurora College, Thebacha Campus for a limited time. One estimate indicated that student turnover at the school could be as high as fifty per cent.

The school is located in the South Slave Region and is administered by the South Slave Divisional Education Council, alongside other schools in the communities of Hay River, Fort Resolution, Łutselk'e, and Kátlodéhche First Nation (Hay River Reserve).

The school was named after Joseph Tyrrell, a geologist and cartographer from Weston, Ontario responsible for leading two expeditions into what is now referred to as the Barren Lands in the Northwest Territories.

== French immersion program ==
The school is, as of 2012, hosting a French immersion program being offered to students from grades one to six. As of end June 2026 the school's French Immersion was cut due to lack of students.
