= Harry Camsell School =

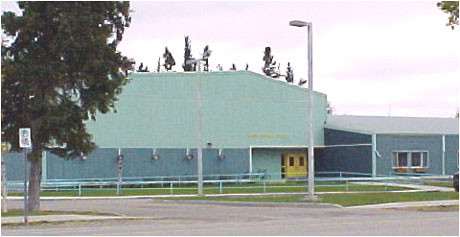

Location
- 54 Woodland Drive; Hay River, Northwest Territories, X0E 0R8; Canada
- Coordinates: 60°48′45″N 115°47′06″W

Information
- Funding type: Public
- School board: Hay River District Education Authority, South Slave DEC
- Superintendent: Souhail Soujah
- Chairperson: Pennie Pokiak (Hay River DEA)
- Principal: Tara Boudreau
- Grades: JK-3
- Enrollment: 160 (2025)
- Language: English, South Slavey
- Website: www.ssdec.net/harry-camsell-school

Harry Camsell School is a JK – 3 school located in Hay River, Northwest Territories, Canada providing public education from kindergarten to grade 3. The administration of the school, along with the Princess Alexandra School and Diamond Jenness Secondary School, is the responsibility of the South Slave Divisional Education Council (SSDEC) and is overseen by the Hay River District Education Authority.
