= Chief Jimmy Bruneau School =

School in Northwest Territories, Canada

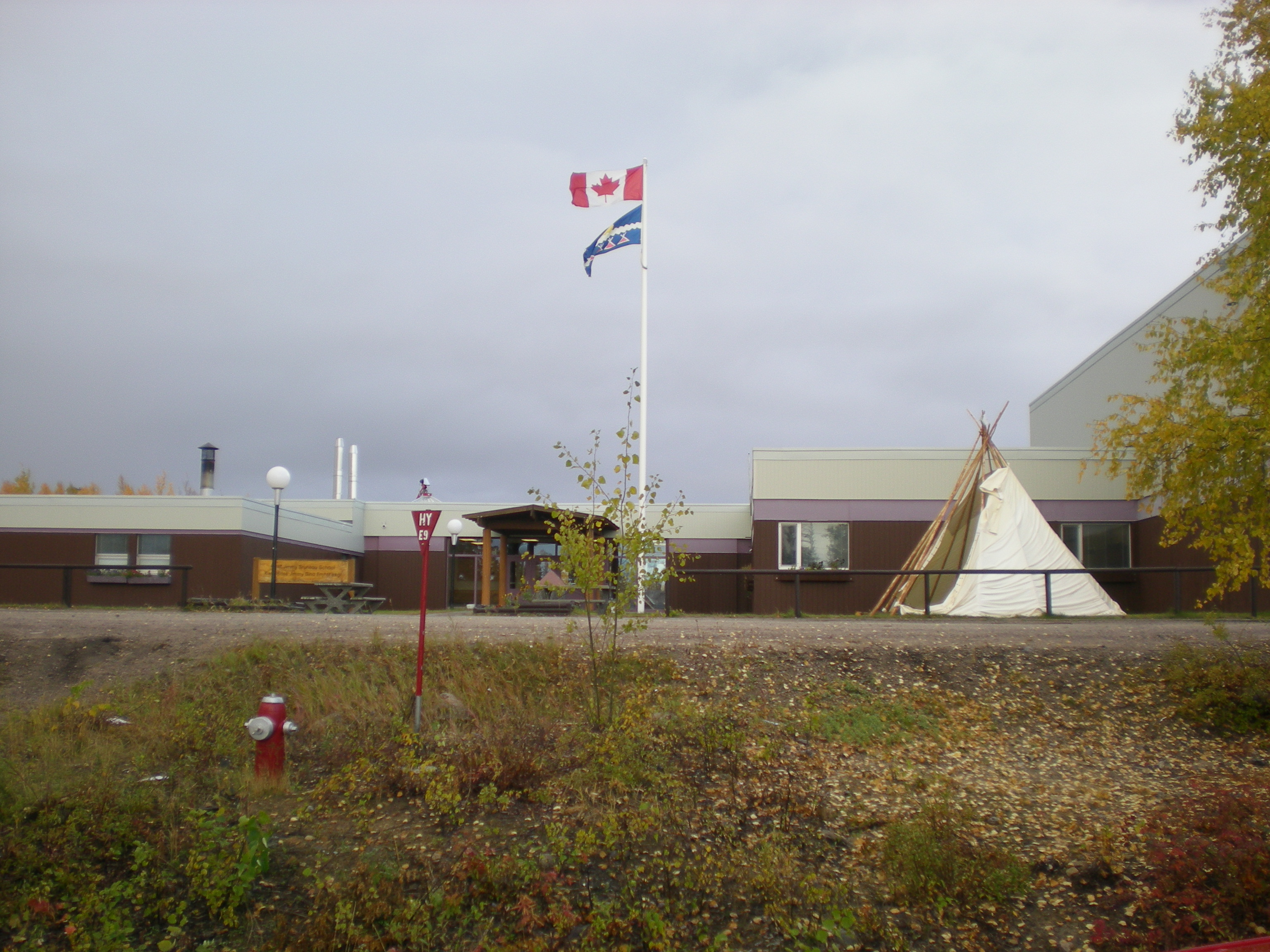

Location
- Bag 1 Behchoko, Northwest Territories, X0E 0Y0; Canada; 62°46′47″N 116°02′00″W

Information
- Established: 1972
- Principal: Dianne Lafferty
- Website: Chief Jimmy Bruneau Regional High School

Chief Jimmy Bruneau School is located in Edzo, 15 km (9.3 mi) south of Rae and serves Behchokǫ̀ in the Northwest Territories, Canada. The school was named after one of the great leaders in Tłı̨chǫ history, Chief Jimmy Bruneau.

== History ==
The school was opened in 1972 by Chief Jimmy Bruneau himself, and former prime minister Jean Chrétien.

== Activities ==
The school has after-school activities, like sewing, computer time, an open gym for students and teachers, and sports teams. The primary sport in the school and in the surrounding Tłı̨chǫ areas is soccer. The entire school takes part in the yearly Get Active event. Every school in the Northwest Territories takes part in this event. The Dene Games is a yearly event; schools from the surrounding Tłı̨chǫ area take part. Stick Pull, Snow Snake, Pole Push, Hand Games, and Finger Pull are the games taken.

== Gonaowoo K'ee ==
Gonaowoo K'ee or "Our Ways" courses focus on teaching senior high students Tłı̨chǫ knowledge and skills traditionally passed on from generation to generation. This acquired knowledge and skill base will assist students in sustaining the Tłı̨chǫ way of life as the young community members become prepared and are highly encouraged to live an active life out on the land. These skills are taught in the natural environment, using Elders, guest speakers, and community members who are strong in their culture. Some module activities include: hunting and trapping, fishing, traditional tool making, and Tłı̨chǫ history and politics. It is currently team taught by Ernestine Steinwand, Chris Stanbridge. Phillip Mackenzie, and Cultural Educational Assistant Joe Mantla.

== Student Council ==
The school's Student Council is an active body, which continues to grow in its responsibilities and tasks each year. CJBS Student Council has been involved in planning and running a number of activities and programs in the five years of its existence. Student Council has been involved in running the Christmas Talent Show, Candy-grams at both Halloween and Christmas, Costume Contests, Adopt a Child Program, Spirit Days, and yearly elections. The student council mascot is "The Warrior" who makes appearances at school events throughout the year. A recent popular student council event is the coffee house in which students and staff show off their creative talents.

== Information technology ==
The information technology program is integrated within school subject areas. The school has computers in each classroom, a fixed computer lab and two mobile computing laboratories.

== Literacy ==
The entire Chief Jimmy Bruneau School takes part in D.E.A.R. (Drop Everything and Read). Following lunch break, staff and students alike stop and read in their classes, in the offices, in the halls, even in the bathroom.

- Public Speaking Contest - the school hosts an annual public speaking contest open to all students from grades K-12. This usually takes place in December.
- All-Nighter Film Festival - held just before Christmas, the All-Nighter is open to all students from grades 9-12.
- Creative Writing Contest - CJBS has several creative writing contests. The form and genre change from year to year.

== See also ==
- List of schools in the Northwest Territories
