= Deninu School =

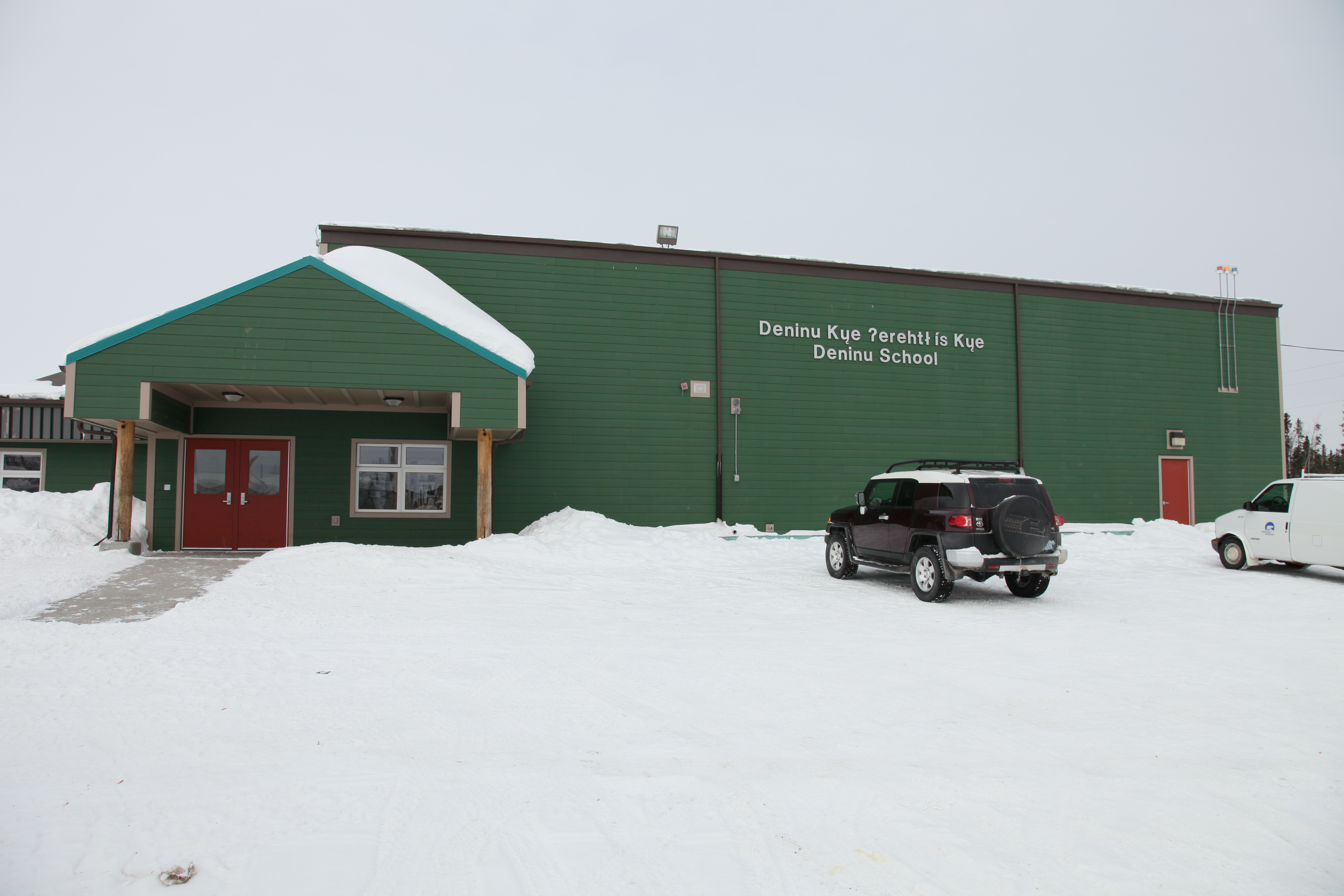

Location
- General Delivery; Fort Resolution, Northwest Territories, X0E 0M0; Canada
- Coordinates: 61°10′14″N 113°40′00″W

Information
- Funding type: Public
- School board: Fort Resolution DEA, South Slave DEC
- Superintendent: Souhail Soujah
- Area trustee: Lisa Miersch (Fort Resolution DEA)
- Principal: Simone De Gannes Lange
- Staff: 20
- Grades: K-12
- Enrollment: 105 (2025)
- Language: English, Chipewyan
- Website: sites.google.com/ssdec.org/deninuschool/home

Deninu School is a K-12 public school located in Fort Resolution, Northwest Territories, Canada. The school currently represents the only public education option for youth in the hamlet and serves a student population of approximately 105 students. The school is overseen by the Fort Resolution District Education Authority and administered by the South Slave Divisional Education Council (SSDEC).

== Dene Kede ==
The school makes extensive use of Dene Kede, a curriculum developed in the Northwest Territories designed specifically for use in small Dene communities such as Fort Resolution. The goal of the curriculum is to develop "capable Dene" and has a strong focus on developing student relationships with the spiritual world, the land, other people, and themselves. Compared with their peers elsewhere in Canada, students in Fort Resolution spend more significant amounts of educational time on the land and learning about their cultural heritage.

== Recognition ==
Deninu School and its staff have received a number of awards for their success helping to improve education in Fort Resolution.

In 2008, principal Moh Odeen was named one of Canada's Outstanding Principal by The Learning Partnership, a Toronto-based NGO.

In June 2012, the entire staff of Deninu was presented with a Premier's Award for Excellence for their work in compiling and publishing a comprehensive English to Chipewyan Dictionary. Then later in August 2012, a committee of elders and others who had contributed to the English to Chipewyan Dictionary from the Deninu School were presented with an Excellent in Education Award by the South Slave Divisional Education Council.
