= Paul William Kaeser High School =

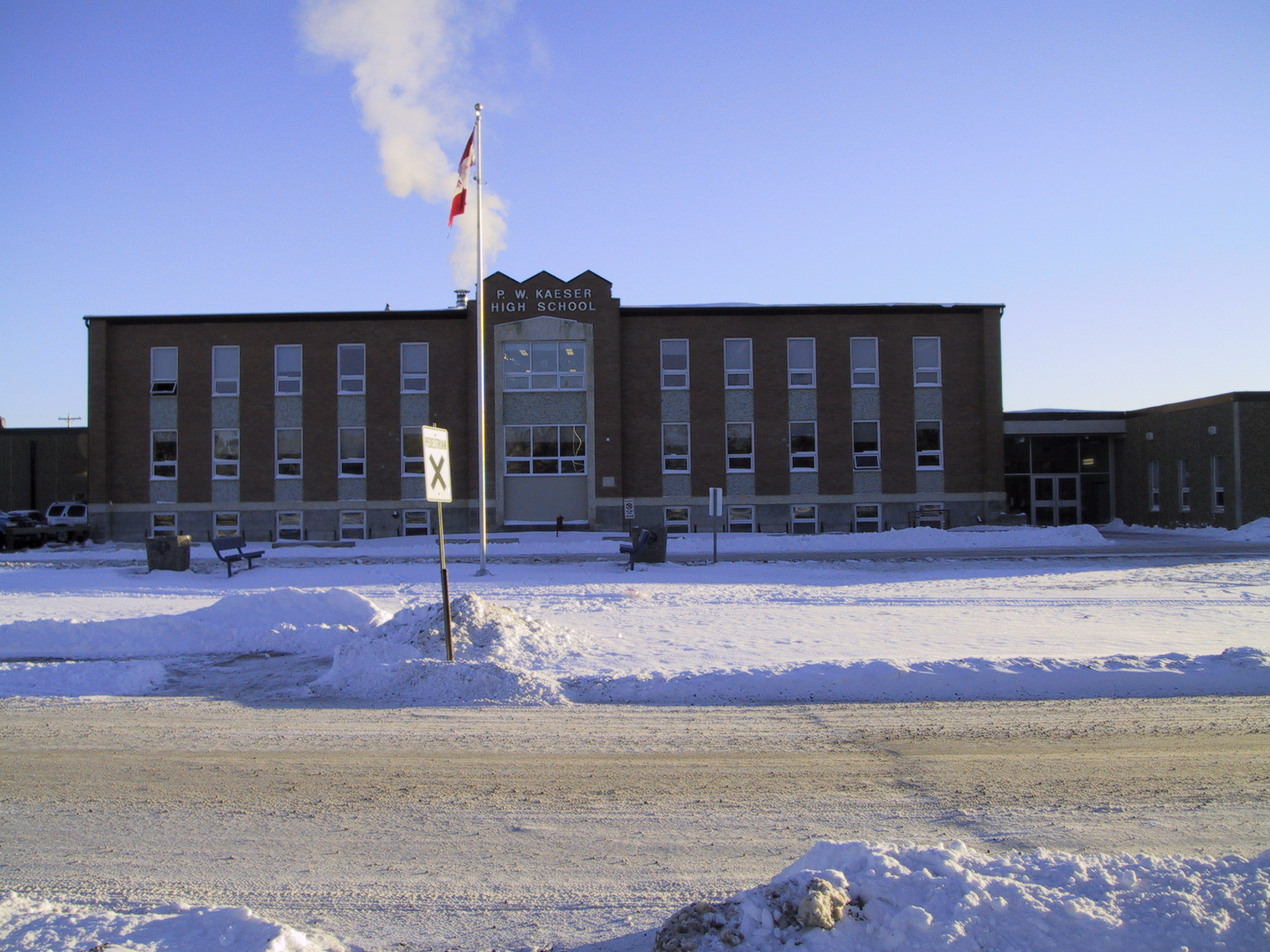

Location
- 97 Conibear Crescent; Fort Smith, Northwest Territories, X0E 0P0; Canada
- Coordinates: 60°00′17″N 111°53′28″W

Information
- Funding type: Public
- School board: Fort Smith District Education Authority, South Slave DEC
- Superintendent: Souhail Soujah
- Chairperson: Connie Benwell (Fort Smith DEA)
- Principal: Christy MacKay
- Staff: 30
- Grades: 7-12
- Enrollment: 240 (2025)
- Language: English, French, Chipewyan
- Website: sites.google.com/a/ssdec.org/pwk-high-school/

Paul William Kaeser High School is a high school in Fort Smith, Northwest Territories, Canada. The school, along with Joseph Burr Tyrrell Elementary School, is overseen by the Fort Smith District Education Authority and administered by the South Slave Divisional Education Council. It provides secondary education services to students from Fort Smith as well as the nearby Salt River First Nation and Smith's Landing First Nation.

The school is named after Paul William Kaeser, a Fort Smith entrepreneur who opened a grocery store in Fort Smith in 1947.

== Clubs ==
As of 2023, there are three main clubs that remain throughout the school year, which are the Newspaper Club, Rainbow Sage, and the Astronomy club. The Astronomy club began this year, and is the only club started by a student.
