= Dehcho Divisional Education Council =

School district in Northwest Territories, Canada

Address
- Box 376, 9800 98th Ave Dehcho Region Fort Simpson, Northwest Territories, X0E 0N0; Canada
- Coordinates: 61°51′49″N 121°21′21″W

District information
- Type: Public
- Grades: JK-12
- Superintendent: Philippe Brûlot
- Asst. superintendent(s): Marty Leach
- School board: 8 trustees
- Chair of the board: Renalyn Pascua-Matte
- Schools: 9

Other information
- Website: https://www.ddec.ca/

The Dehcho Divisional Education Council is the public school board for the Dehcho Region, in the Northwest Territories. Located in Fort Simpson the education council represents nine schools in eight communities.

As of 2024, the board is made up of eight trustees with a chair, Renalyn Pascua-Matte from Fort Simpson, and vice-chair, Anita Simba-Chicot from Kakisa.

== List of schools ==
The following are the schools in the DDEC

| Community | School | Grades | Principal | Staff | Students | Notes / References |
|---|---|---|---|---|---|---|
| Fort Liard (Acho Dene Koe) | Echo Dene School | JK – 12 | Illonis Hall | 18 | 120 | Does not include support staff |
| Fort Providence (Deh Gah Got’ı̨ę) | Deh Gáh Elementary & Secondary School | JK – 12 | Lois Philipp | 18.5 | 105 | |
| Fort Simpson (Łı̨́ı̨́dĺ̨ı̨́ı̨́ Kų́ę́) | Líídlįį Kúę Elementary School | JK – 6 | Ben Adams | 23 | 110 | |
| Fort Simpson (Łı̨́ı̨́dĺ̨ı̨́ı̨́ Kų́ę́) | Łı̨́ı̨́dĺ̨ı̨́ı̨́ Kų́ę́ High School | 7 – 12 | Korinne McDonald | 17 | 100 | |
| Jean Marie River (Tthets’éhk’edélı̨) | Louie Norwegian School | JK – 9 | Geoff Cook | 5 | | Named after Chief Louie Norwegian |
| Kakisa (Ka’a gee Tu) | Kakisa Lake School | JK – 9 | Jasna Finlay | | | |
| Nahanni Butte (Nahɂą Dehé) | Charles Yohin School | JK – 10 | Charyl O'Quinn | | | |
| Sambaa K'e | Charles Tetcho School | JK – 9 | Kristy Nicholls | >4 | 16 | Does not include support staff |
| Wrigley (Pedzéh Kı̨) | Chief Julian Yendo School | JK – 9 | Sylvester Boadi | >3 | 21 | Does not include support staff |
