= Chief Sunrise Education Centre =

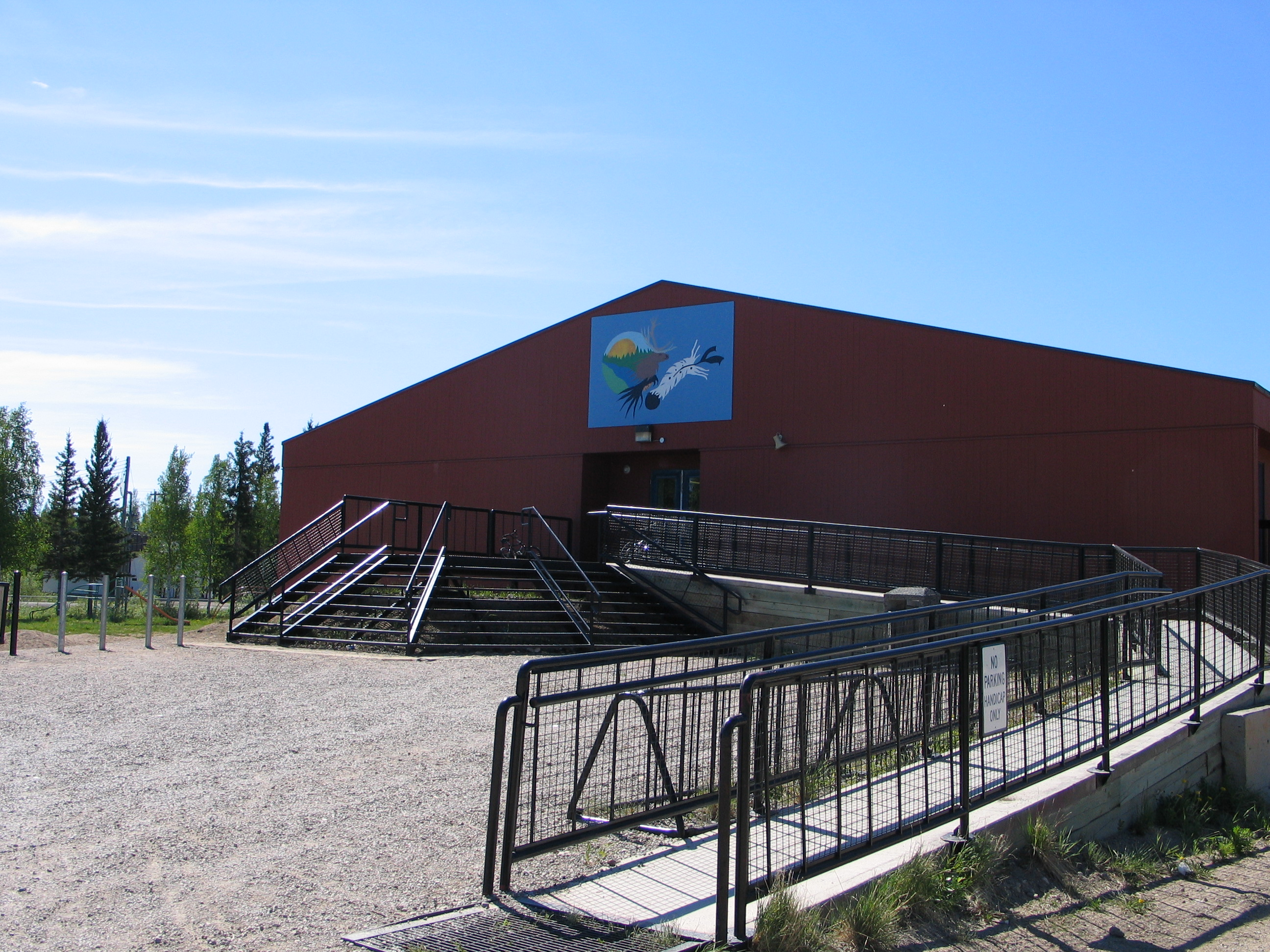

Location
- P.O. Box 3055; K'atl'odeche First Nation, Northwest Territories, X0E 1G4; Canada
- Coordinates: 60°50′05″N 115°45′43″W

Information
- Funding type: Public
- School board: K'atl'odeche First Nation DEA, South Slave DEC
- Superintendent: Souhail Soujah
- Chairperson: Josie Tourangeau (K'atl'odeche First Nation DEA)
- Principal: Deborah Reid
- Grades: K-12
- Enrollment: 60 (2025)
- Language: English, South Slavey
- Website: www.ssdec.nt.ca/schools/Chief_Sunrise.htm

Chief Sunrise Education Centre is a publicly funded K-12 school, located in K'atl'odeche First Nation (also known as the Hay River Dene Reserve) in the Northwest Territories, Canada. The school is overseen by the K'atl'odeche First Nation District Education Authority and administered by the South Slave Divisional Education Council. The facility provides education for approximately 60 students.
