= Hay River Reserve =

Hay River Reserve Kʼatlodeeche/Katlʼodeeche First Nation Hay River Dene 1
- Kʼatlodeechee First Nation
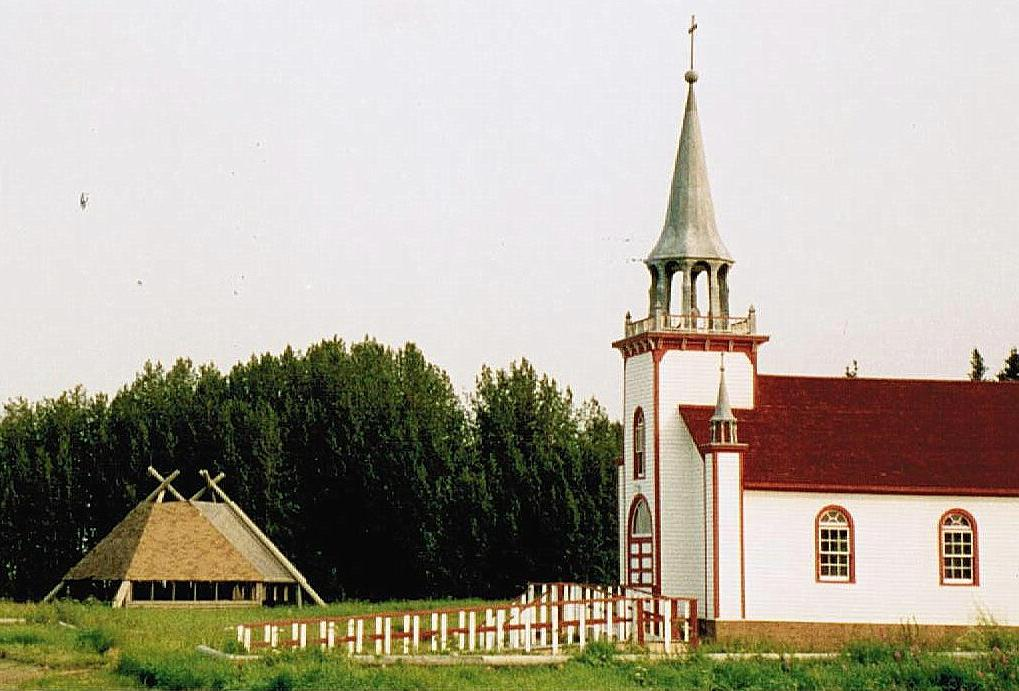
- Ste. Anne's Roman Catholic Church (NHSC)

- Location within Northwest Territories Location within Canada
- Coordinates: 60°48′00″N 115°44′05″W
- Country: Canada
- Territory: Northwest Territories
- Region: South Slave Region
- Constituency: Deh Cho
- Census division: Region 4

Government
  - Chief: April Martel
  - CEO: Paul Squires
  - MLA: Michael McLeod

Area (2021)
  - Land: 134.00 km^{2} (51.74 sq mi)
- Elevation: 165 m (541 ft)

Population (2021)
  - Total: 259
  - Density: 1.9/km^{2} (4.9/sq mi)
- Time zone: UTC−06:00 (Northwest Territories Time)
- Postal code: X0E 1G4
- Area code: 867
- Telephone exchange: 874
- Food price index: 116.2^{A}
- Sources: Department of Municipal and Community Affairs, Prince of Wales Northern Heritage Centre, Canada Flight Supplement^A2015 figure based on Yellowknife = 100

Hay River Reserve (also known as Kʼatlodeeche/Katlʼodeeche First Nation or Hay River Dene 1) is one of only two Indian reserves in Canada's Northwest Territories. Located in the South Slave Region, it is a Slavey community with a population of 259, of which the majority are First Nations and some Métis, at the 2021 Canadian census, a 16.2% decrease from the 2016 census. The main languages on the reserve are South Slavey, and English. In 2017 the Government of the Northwest Territories reported that the population was 329, resulting in an average annual growth rate of 0.4% between 2007 and 2017.

The reserve covers an area of 13,517.4 ha (33,402 acres) and claims a band membership of 668 people. The reserve is governed by a Band Council, consisting of a Chief and four Counsellors, who are elected every two years on "Treaty Day". Along with the Fort Providence Dene Band the reserve operates "Evergreen Forestry Management Ltd." The reserve also runs the Ehdah Cho Store, "Tu-Cho Gha Contracting", and the "Nats’jee Keh Treatment Centre".

Primary and secondary education in the community is provided by Chief Sunrise Education Centre.

== History ==
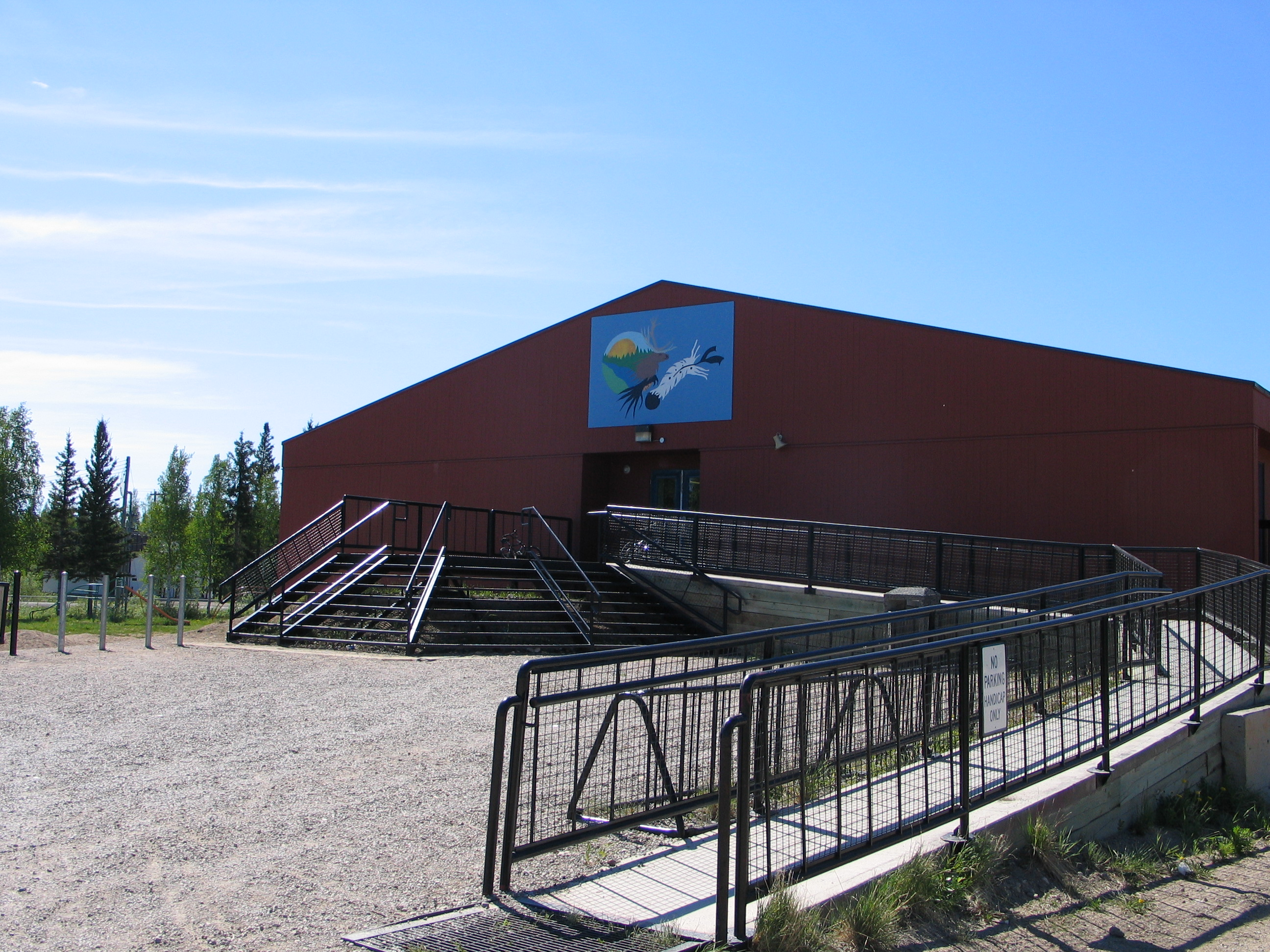
Chief Sunrise Education Centre, 2004

Although the Dene had been using the area around the mouth of the Hay River for many years as a fishing site it was not settled until the 1890s when Chief Chiatlo led a group to the site. Later both the Anglican, with a mission school, and the Roman Catholic Church along with trading posts and the Royal Canadian Mounted Police arrived. However, the NWT Government says that the first building in the area was the Hudson's Bay Company, followed by the Roman Catholic Mission, and then the Anglican Mission.

The original site was located right at the mouth of the river just east of Vale Island at 60°51′32″N 115°43′33″W However, this site was subject to flooding and it was decided to move to a different area. The current site is located on the south shore of the Hay River, near the mouth of Great Slave Lake In 1974 the then chief, Daniel Sonfrere, negotiated a settlement with the Government of Canada and the first reserve in the NWT was formed.

The site of the original mission buildings, including St. Peter's Anglican Church, Ste. Anne's Roman Catholic Church, the remains of a rectory, and associated cemeteries, was designated as a National Historic Site of Canada in 1992, due to its association with the meeting of Dene and European cultures.

== Gallery ==
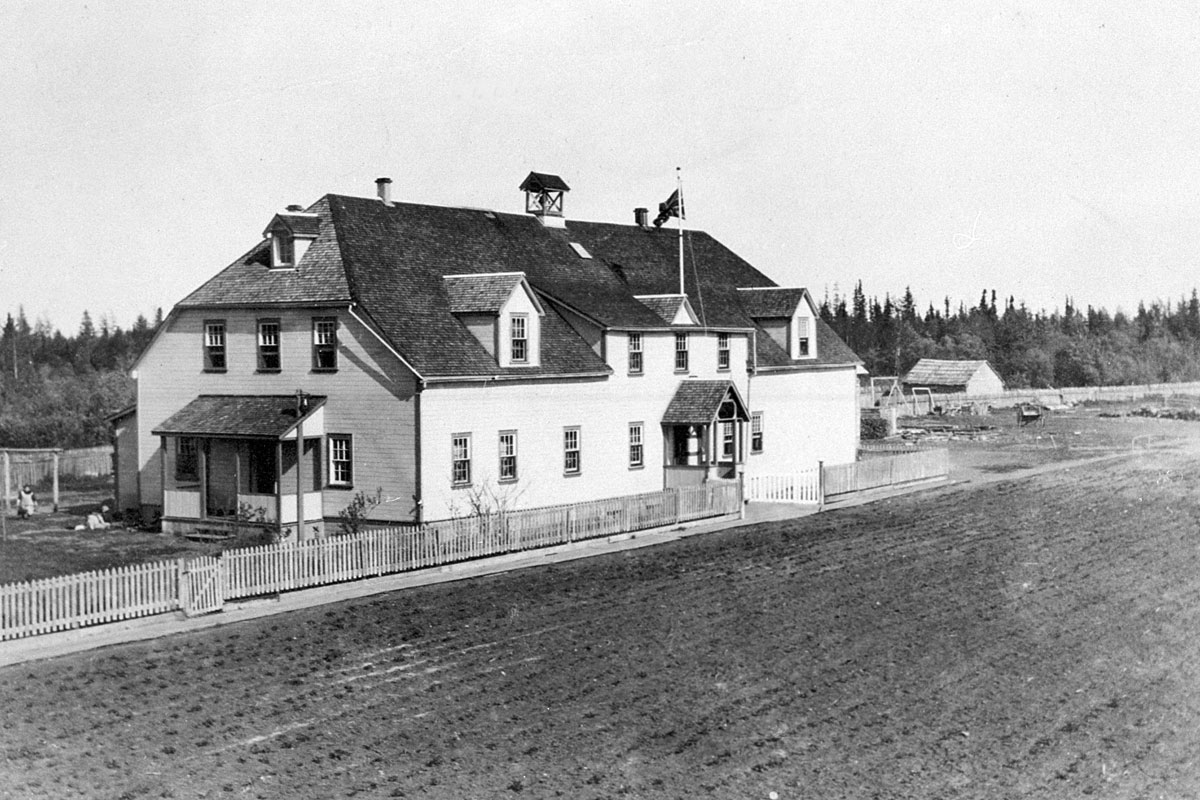
Hay River Mission site

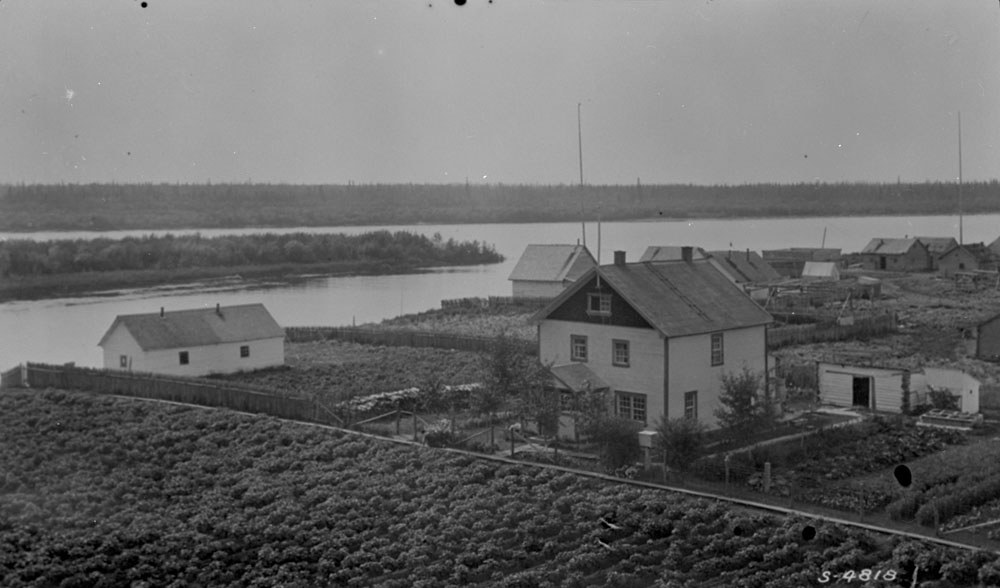
A view of the Hay River settlement from the Mission Boarding School, 1922

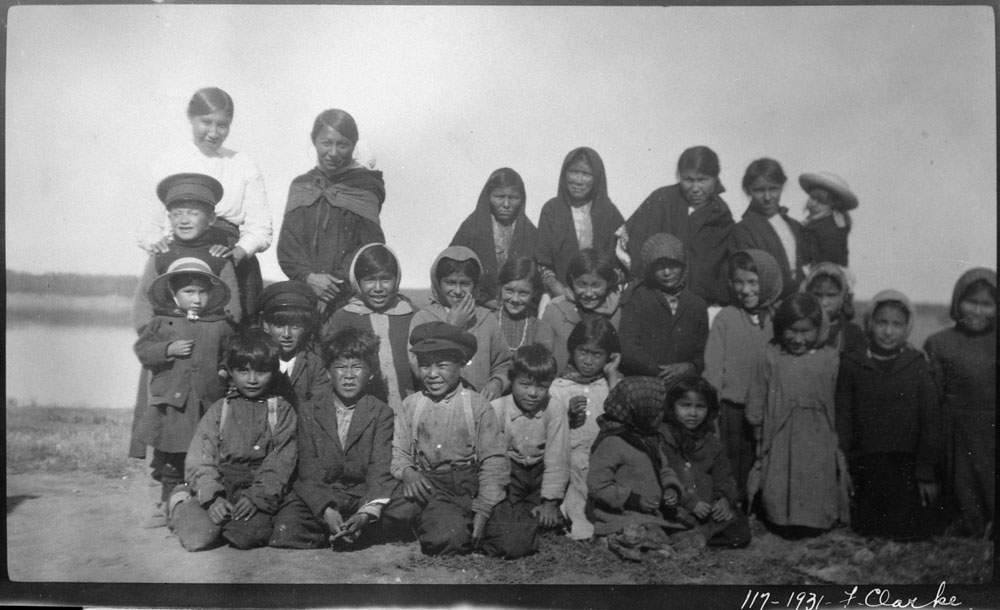
Children on their way to school in Hay River, 1931

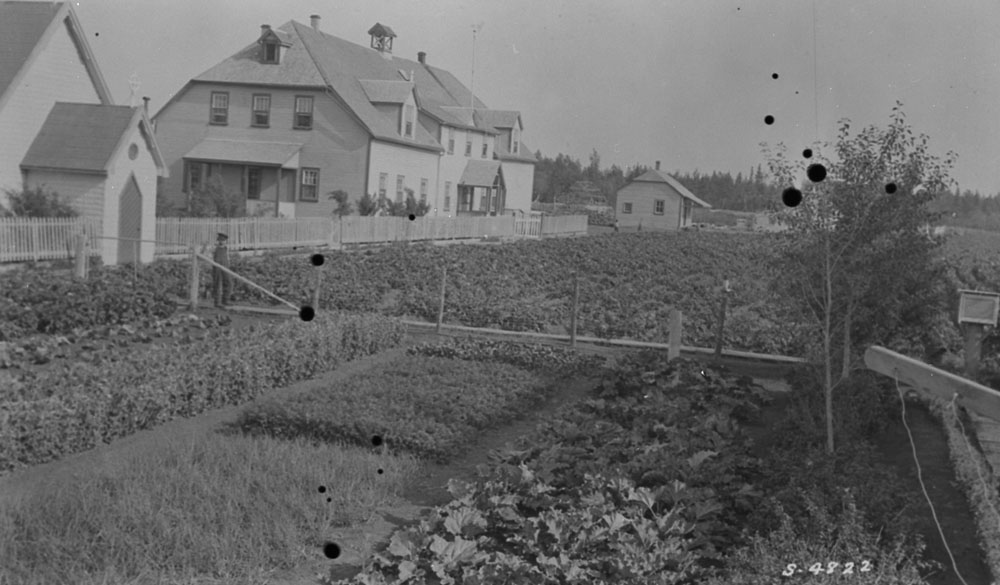
St. Luke's English Church Mission School, Hay River, 1922

== Climate ==
Hay River has a subarctic climate (Dfc) with mild to warm summers and long cold winters.

Climate data for Hay River (Hay River/Merlyn Carter Airport) WMO ID: 71935; coordinates 60°50′23″N 115°46′58″W; elevation: 164.9 m (541 ft); 1991–2020 normals, extremes 1893–present (Note: Climate data was recorded at Hay River from September 1893 to June 1943 and at Hay River Airport from April 1943 to present.)
Month	Jan	Feb	Mar	Apr	May	Jun	Jul	Aug	Sep	Oct	Nov	Dec	Year
Record high humidex	10.6	12.9	17.3	25.8	31.1	35.1	44.6	39.8	32.2	25.4	12.8	11.2	44.6
Record high °C (°F)	10.7 (51.3)	13.9 (57.0)	17.6 (63.7)	26.0 (78.8)	33.3 (91.9)	34.0 (93.2)	35.6 (96.1)	36.7 (98.1)	31.7 (89.1)	25.6 (78.1)	15.0 (59.0)	14.4 (57.9)	36.7 (98.1)
Mean daily maximum °C (°F)	−16.9 (1.6)	−13.7 (7.3)	−7.7 (18.1)	2.4 (36.3)	11.4 (52.5)	18.4 (65.1)	21.7 (71.1)	19.9 (67.8)	13.8 (56.8)	4.3 (39.7)	−7.0 (19.4)	−14.2 (6.4)	2.7 (36.9)
Daily mean °C (°F)	−21.4 (−6.5)	−19.1 (−2.4)	−13.7 (7.3)	−3.1 (26.4)	5.9 (42.6)	12.9 (55.2)	16.6 (61.9)	14.9 (58.8)	9.2 (48.6)	0.8 (33.4)	−10.7 (12.7)	−18.4 (−1.1)	−2.2 (28.0)
Mean daily minimum °C (°F)	−25.8 (−14.4)	−24.3 (−11.7)	−19.6 (−3.3)	−8.6 (16.5)	0.3 (32.5)	7.4 (45.3)	11.5 (52.7)	9.8 (49.6)	4.5 (40.1)	−2.7 (27.1)	−14.4 (6.1)	−22.6 (−8.7)	−7.0 (19.4)
Record low °C (°F)	−52.2 (−62.0)	−50.6 (−59.1)	−47.2 (−53.0)	−40.0 (−40.0)	−24.4 (−11.9)	−6.1 (21.0)	−1.7 (28.9)	−6.7 (19.9)	−15.6 (3.9)	−26.1 (−15.0)	−40.8 (−41.4)	−51.2 (−60.2)	−52.2 (−62.0)
Record low wind chill	−58.7	−60.4	−54.9	−47.7	−26.6	−7.4	0.0	0.0	−17.1	−34.3	−54.4	−55.8	−60.4
Average precipitation mm (inches)	16.6 (0.65)	13.9 (0.55)	15.3 (0.60)	11.1 (0.44)	20.8 (0.82)	25.4 (1.00)	41.9 (1.65)	59.7 (2.35)	42.3 (1.67)	33.0 (1.30)	24.0 (0.94)	16.4 (0.65)	320.3 (12.61)
Average rainfall mm (inches)	0.3 (0.01)	0.2 (0.01)	0.3 (0.01)	3.9 (0.15)	16.2 (0.64)	25.1 (0.99)	43.8 (1.72)	60.2 (2.37)	42.9 (1.69)	15.9 (0.63)	0.8 (0.03)	0.3 (0.01)	209.9 (8.26)
Average snowfall cm (inches)	22.2 (8.7)	16.6 (6.5)	16.8 (6.6)	8.9 (3.5)	4.3 (1.7)	0.0 (0.0)	0.0 (0.0)	0.0 (0.0)	1.1 (0.4)	19.1 (7.5)	34.4 (13.5)	22.1 (8.7)	145.5 (57.3)
Average precipitation days (≥ 0.2 mm)	11.7	10.8	9.7	5.3	6.9	8.4	9.8	11.2	11.7	12.4	13.2	11.8	123.0
Average rainy days (≥ 0.2 mm)	0.2	0.1	0.3	2.0	5.5	8.3	9.7	11.1	11.9	6.6	1.0	0.5	57.2
Average snowy days (≥ 0.2 cm)	12.2	9.6	8.5	3.3	1.7	0.0	0.0	0.0	0.7	6.9	13.8	12.5	69.1
Average relative humidity (%) (at 1500 LST)	70.5	67.3	60.8	59.2	53.6	54.1	56.9	59.3	61.2	70.6	79.2	74.8	64.0
Source: Environment and Climate Change Canada (January minimum) (February minimum) (March minimum) (April minimum) (May minimum) (June minimum) (July minimum / maximum) (August minimum) (September minimum / maximum) (October minimum / maximum) (December minimum / maximum)

== Demographics ==
Historical population

Year	Pop.	±%
2001	290	—
2002	293	+1.0%
2003	293	+0.0%
2004	301	+2.7%
2005	307	+2.0%
2006	314	+2.3%
2007	316	+0.6%
2008	315	−0.3%
2009	304	−3.5%

Year	Pop.	±%
2010	305	+0.3%
2011	307	+0.7%
2012	311	+1.3%
2013	312	+0.3%
2014	316	+1.3%
2015	321	+1.6%
2016	325	+1.2%
2017	329	+1.2%

Sources: NWT Bureau of Statistics (2001 - 2012), NWT Bureau of Statistics (2006 - 2017)

In the 2021 Canadian census conducted by Statistics Canada, Hay River Dene 1 had a population of 259 living in 90 of its 116 total private dwellings, a change of −16.2% from its 2016 population of 309. With a land area of 134 km^{2} (52 sq mi), it had a population density of 1.9/km^{2} (5.0/sq mi) in 2021.

== Arts and culture ==
Hay River Reserve is the setting for a children's story called Smelly Socks. The book was written by Robert Munsch and illustrated by Michael Martchenko. Munsch created the story based on a little girl named Tina whom he met while visiting the reserve in 1984. The illustrations in the book were based on actual pictures of Tina and the community provided by local multimedia artist Frederick Lepine.

== See also ==
- Hay River
- Hay River/Merlyn Carter Airport
- Hay River Water Aerodrome
- Hay River (District) Heliport
