= Numbered highways in Canada =

Highways of Canada by province and territory

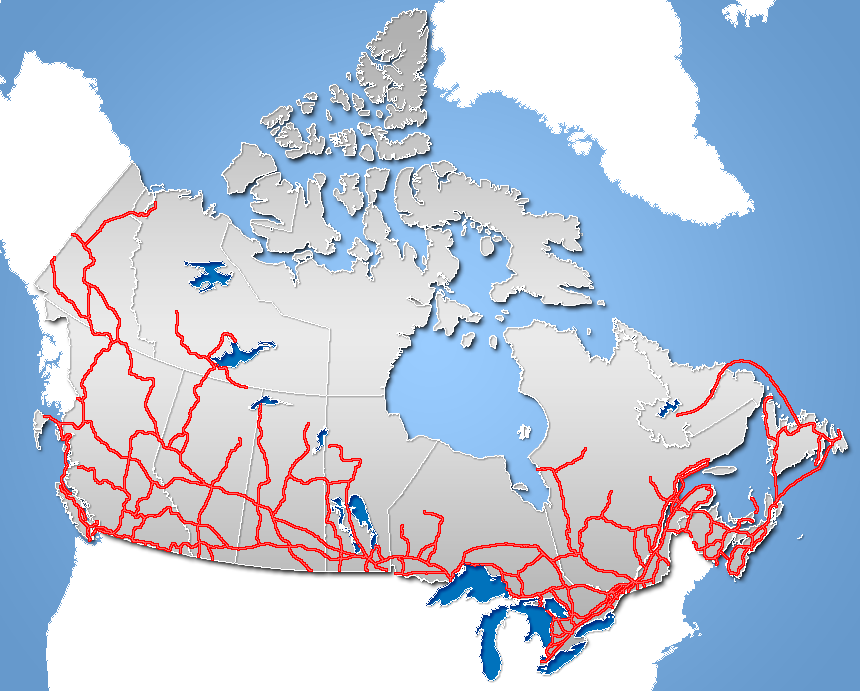
Highways in Canada's provinces and territories

Numbered highways in Canada are split by province, and a majority are maintained by their province or territory transportation department. With few exceptions, all highways in Canada are numbered. Nonetheless, every province has a number of highways that are better known locally by their name rather than their number. Some highways have additional letters added to their number: A is typically an alternate route, B is typically a business route, and other letters are used for bypass (truck) routes, connector routes, scenic routes, and spur routes. The territory of Nunavut has no highways.

== Classifications ==
This is a breakdown of the classifications of highways in each province, and an example shield of each classification where available.

=== Trans-Canada ===
The Trans-Canada Highway crosses all provinces of Canada.

- Trans-Canada Highway
- Yellowhead Highway

=== Alberta ===
All provincial highways in Alberta are 'Primary Highways'. They are divided into two series, and sub-series.

- 1-216 Series — core highway network
  - Hwy 1-100 — intercity (Hwy 100 is unmarked, ex:Hwy 2)
  - Hwy 201, 216 — orbital routes (ex:Hwy 216)
- 500-986 Series — local highways
  - Hwy 500-699 — west–east routes (ex:Hwy 501)
  - Hwy 700-899 — south–north routes (ex:Hwy 881)
  - 900 and X series — potential realignments and extensions (ex:Hwy 986)

=== British Columbia ===
Varying between west–east and south–north routes, route numbers in British Columbia span from 1-118, except for Hwy 395 which is a counterpart of US 395. The 400 series highways were renumbered in 1973.
(ex: Hwy 97)

=== Manitoba ===
Provincial Trunk Highways (PTH) in Manitoba are divided into two series.

- PTH 1-199 — primary routes
  - PTH 1-89 — intercity (ex:PTH 75)
  - PTH 100, 101, 110 — loop routes (ex:Perimeter Highway)
- PR 200-699 — secondary routes

=== New Brunswick ===
Provincial highways in New Brunswick are divided into three series.

- Route 1-99 — arterial highways (ex:Route 11)
- Route 100-199 — collector highways (ex:Route 108)
- Route 200-999 — local highways (ex:Route 275)

=== Newfoundland and Labrador ===
Provincial highways in Newfoundland and Labrador are divided into three series.

- Main highways
  - Routes 1, 210, 230, 320, 330, 340, 360, 410, 430, 480, 500, and 510
- Regional roads are numbered by region
  - Route 2-203 — Avalon Peninsula
  - Route 204-205, 230-239 — Bonavista Peninsula
  - Route 210-222 — Burin Peninsula
  - Route 301-346 — Kittiwake Coast, Fogo Island, & Twillingate
  - Route 350-371 — Exploits River Valley & Bay d'Espoir
  - Route 380-392, 410-419 — Baie Verte
  - Route 401, 420-438 — Great Northern Peninsula
  - Route 402-407, 440-490 — Western Newfoundland
  - Route 500-520 — Labrador
- Local highways are based on intersecting primary routes and numbered with extension (i.e. 210-1)

=== Nova Scotia ===
Provincial highways in Nova Scotia are divided into five series.

- 100 Series — arterial highways (ex:Hwy 102)
- Trunk Highways (ex:Trunk 4)
- Route 200-399 — collector highways (ex:Route 221)
- Scenic Routes are unnumbered
- Local roads are unnumbered

=== Ontario ===
Provincial highways (the King's Highway) in Ontario are divided into four classes:

- Hwy 2-148, 400-427, QEW — primary highways
  - Hwy 2-148 — intercity (ex:Highway 11) usually with at-grade intersections
  - 400-427 — 400-series freeways and limited-access highways
  - The Queen Elizabeth Way (QEW) is a de facto part of the 400-series, and is given a numerical designation of 451 in some documents, although this number is not posted on the road itself
- Hwy 500-699 — secondary highways (ex:Highway 502)
- Hwy 800-813 — tertiary highways (ex:Highway 808)
- 7000-series — resource & industrial roads (unmarked) or short stubs connecting numbered highways

=== Prince Edward Island ===
Provincial highways in Prince Edward Island are divided into three series.

- Route 1-4 — arterial highways
- Route 4-26 — collector highways
- Local highways are numbered by county
  - Route 101-199 — Prince County
  - Route 201-299 — Queens County
  - Route 301-399 — Kings County

=== Quebec ===
Provincial highways in Quebec are divided into three classes. Odd numbers generally refer to north–south routes. Even numbers generally refer to east–west routes.

- Autoroutes — expressways (Route 920 is unmarked, ex:Autoroute 20)
  - Route numbers for bypasses and spurs take on a prefix (4nn-9nn)
- 100-series — primary highways (ex:Route 138)
- Secondary routes
  - 200-series — south of the Saint Lawrence River (ex:Route 263)
  - 300-series — north of the Saint Lawrence River (ex:Route 348)

=== Saskatchewan ===
Provincial highways in Saskatchewan are divided into three series, and sub-series.

- Hwy 1-99 — primary highways (ex:Hwy 11)
- Hwy 100-399 — secondary highways which are spurs of primary highways
  - Hwy 102-167 — northern routes (ex:Hwy 106)
  - Hwy 201-271 — routes to recreational areas (ex:Hwy 211)
  - Hwy 301-397 — routes to minor communities (ex:Hwy 375)
- Hwy 600-799, 900-999 — minor highways
  - Hwy 600-699 — south–north highways
  - Hwy 700-799 — west–east highways
  - Hwy 900-999 — northern or isolated roads (ex:Hwy 999)

=== Northwest Territories ===
There are currently ten territorial highways in the Northwest Territories. All are named as well as numbered 1-10.

Other roads include the Mackenzie Valley winter road system that extends Northwest Territories Highway 1, the Tibbitt to Contwoyto Winter Road, and the Dettah Ice Road extending from Yellowknife to the community of Dettah.

The now-closed Tuktoyaktuk Winter Road and Tłı̨chǫ winter road systems were replaced by the Inuvik–Tuktoyaktuk Highway (which extended from the northern terminus of the Dempster Highway) and the Tłı̨chǫ Highway (extending from the Yellowknife Highway), respectively.

=== Nunavut ===
There are a number of roads in Nunavut; none are yet numbered highways.

=== Yukon ===
There are currently fourteen territorial highways in Yukon. All fourteen are named and numbered 1-11, 14-15, & 37.

== See also ==
- Roads in Canada
