= Roads in Canada =

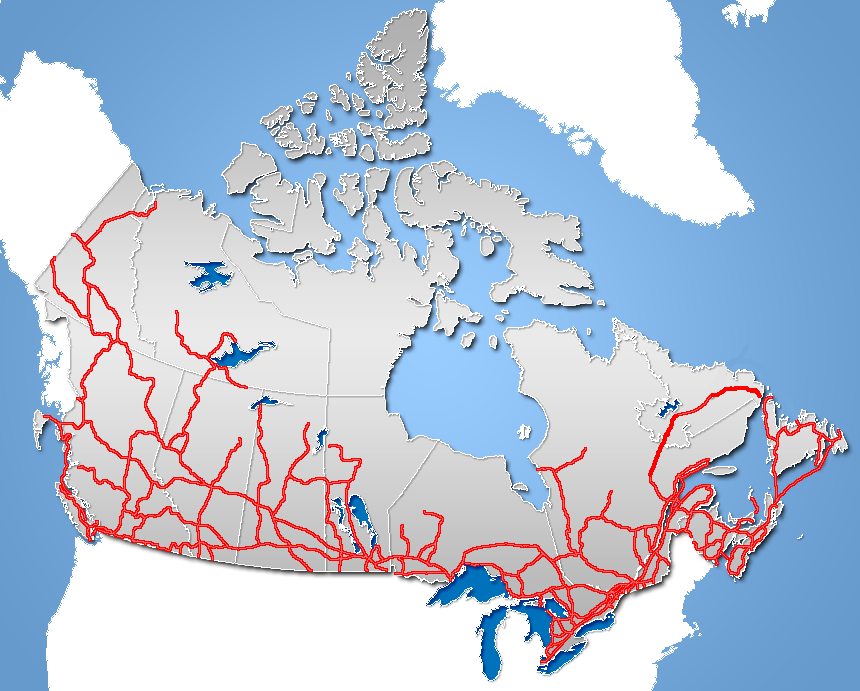
Major roads in Canada

Roads in Canada fall under the responsibility of the provinces and territories. As such, apart from the Trans-Canada Highway, major roads in Canada are planned, designated, and classified at a provincial or territorial level. The National Highway System serves as a national classification of strategically important roads within Canada, but the roads in the system are still under provincial or territorial jurisdiction.

Metrics for road safety includes 50 fatalities per million population or 4.7 per billion vehicle kilometre travelled. This range with extreme values in NT (best) and PE (worse) provinces.

== Roads by province or territory ==
These articles outline the full road networks of provinces and territories beyond their provincial or territorial highways:

- Highways in Nunavut
- Roads in Ontario
- Roads in Saskatchewan

== Controlled-access highways ==
- List of controlled-access highways in Ontario

== Provincial and territorial highways ==
- List of Alberta provincial highways
- List of British Columbia provincial highways
- List of Manitoba provincial highways
- List of New Brunswick provincial highways
- List of Newfoundland and Labrador highways
- List of Northwest Territories highways
- List of Nova Scotia provincial highways
- List of Ontario provincial highways
- List of Prince Edward Island provincial highways
- List of Quebec provincial highways
- List of Saskatchewan provincial highways
- List of Yukon territorial highways

== County and regional roads ==
- List of county roads in Ontario

== Signage ==
Canada has adopted a partly modified road signage patterned on the Manual on Uniform Traffic Control Devices (MUTCD) of the United States. The stop sign designs for instance in some areas of Canada may feature the French-language as a local cultural adaptation. Canada's MUTCDC also contrasts from the United Nations-style standard consisting of the 1968 United Nations' Vienna Convention on Road Signs and Signals.

== Speed limits ==
Speed limits in Canada are set by different levels of government (federal, provincial, and municipal), depending on the jurisdiction under which the road falls, resulting in differences from province to province. Since September 1, 1977, speed limits have been posted in kilometres per hour (km/h).

== See also ==
- Category:Roads in Canada by province or territory
- Driving in Canada
- Transportation in Canada
