= List of Northwest Territories highways =

The following is a list of territorial highways in the Northwest Territories of Canada. They are divided amongst Arterial Class Highways, of which there are six; Collector Class Highways, of which there are 23; and closed highways, of which there are two. Only some places in the Northwest Territories can be reached by means of highways.

== Arterial Class Highways ==
Arterial Class Highways
Number	Length (km)	Length (mi)	Southern or western terminus	Northern or eastern terminus	Local names	Formed	Removed	Notes
Highway 1	687	427	Highway 35	Wrigley-Fort Good Hope Winter Road – Wrigley	Mackenzie Highway	1949	current	Longest highway in the territory
Highway 2	48.6	30.2	Highway 1 – Enterprise	Northwest corner of Vale Island – Hay River	Hay River Highway; 104th Street (north Hay River)	1949	current	Shortest highway in the territory
Highway 3	338.8	210.5	Highway 1 – Fort Providence	Yellowknife Access Road – Yellowknife	Yellowknife Highway; Frontier Trail	1960	current	Also known as the Great Slave Highway
Highway 5	267.0	165.9	Highway 2 – Hay River	Highway 48 – Fort Smith	Fort Smith Highway	1966	current	Passes through Wood Buffalo National Park
Highway 7	254.1	157.9	Highway 77	Highway 1 – Fort Simpson	Liard Highway	1984	current	Packed dirt and gravel road
Highway 8	272.5	169.3	Hwy 5	Navy Road – Inuvik	Dempster Highway; Marine Bypass Road (Inuvik)	1979	current	Canada's only all-weather road to cross the Arctic Circle; studies are being done to include a possible link to the Mackenzie Highway
1.000 mi = 1.609 km; 1.000 km = 0.621 mi

== Collector Class Highways ==
Collector Class Highways
Number	Length (km)	Length (mi)	Southern or western terminus	Northern or eastern terminus	Local names	Formed	Removed	Notes
Aklavik Ice Road	116	72	Hansen Road – Aklavik	Highway 8 – Inuvik		—	—	Seasonal
Canol Road	357	222	Norman Wells	Macmillan Pass, Yukon/Northwest Territories border		1943	1945	Second World War road completed early 1943, abandoned mid-1945, now the Canol Heritage Trail, connecting to the active Yukon Highway 6, the Canol Road
Colville Lake Winter Road	165	103	Wrigley-Fort Good Hope Winter Road	Colville Lake		c. 2008	current	Seasonal
Délîne Winter Road	105.3	65.4	Wrigley-Fort Good Hope Winter Road	Délîne		—	—	Seasonal
Dettah Ice Road	6.3	3.9	Drygeese Tili – Dettah	School Draw Avenue – Yellowknife		—	—	Seasonal
Dettah Road	11.3	7.0	Ehs'doo Tili / It'o Tili – Dettah	Highway 4		—	—	
Fort Liard Access Road	5.3	3.3	Caragana Road / Valley Main Street – Fort Liard	Highway 7	Valley Main Street	—	—	
Fort McPherson Access Road	1.1	0.68	Highway 8	Tadit Francis Avenue / Tetlit Gwich'in Road – Fort McPherson	Tetlit Gwich'in Road	—	—	
Fort Providence Access Road	5.4	3.4	Highway 3	O Street / DehCho Drive – Fort Providence		—	—	
Highway 6	90.0	55.9	Highway 5	Great Slave Route – Fort Resolution	Fort Resolution Highway	—	—	Also provides access to the former community of Pine Point.
Fort Simpson Access Road	3.4	2.1	Highway 1 – Fort Simpson	93rd Avenue – Fort Simpson		—	—	
Gamètì Winter Road	128.0	79.5	Whatì Winter Road	Gamètì		—	—	Seasonal; previously Rae Lakes Ice Road
Highway 4	69.2	43.0	Highway 3 – Yellowknife	Tibbitt to Contwoyto Winter Road	Ingraham Trail	c. 1965	current	Provides access to Dettah (27 km (17 mi)) when the ice road (6.5 km (4.0 mi)) is closed.
Inuvik Access Road	0.6	0.37	Highway 8	Gwich'in Road / MacKenzie Road – Inuvik	MacKenzie Road	—	—	
Highway 10	133.6	83.0	Navy Road – Inuvik	Quimavik Road – Tuktoyaktuk	Inuvik-Tuktoyaktuk Highway	2017	current	Replaced the Inuvik-Tuktoyaktuk Ice Road; construction began 2013, completed 2017 and opened in November.
Nahanni Butte Winter Road	22.3	13.9	Nahanni Butte	Highway 7		—	—	Seasonal
Sambaa K’e Winter Road	126.0	78.3	Sambaa K’e	Highway 1		—	—	Seasonal
Tibbitt to Contwoyto Winter Road	568	353	Highway 4	Jericho Diamond Mine, Nunavut		1982	current	Private road first built in 1982 to service mines and exploration activities
Highway 9	97.0	60.3	Highway 3	Whatì Winter Road – Whatì	Tłı̨chǫ Highway	2021	current	Opened in November 2021.
Rae Access Road	10.5	6.5	Highway 3	Degai Ma Tili / Donda Tili / Ohnda Tili – Behchokǫ̀	Donda Tili	—	—	
Tuktoyaktuk Winter Road	187	116	Inuvik	Tuktoyaktuk		—	2017	Former ice road; closed permanently in April 2017 with the completion of the Inuvik-Tuktoyaktuk Highway
Wekweètì Winter Road	235.0	146.0	Whatì Winter Road	Wekweètì		c. 2019	current	Seasonal
Whatì Winter Road	100	62	Highway 3 – Behchokǫ̀	Highway 9 – Whatì		—	2021	Seasonal; previously Lac La Martre Winter Road; closed when Highway 9 gave access to Whatì
Wrigley-Fort Good Hope Winter Road	486.4	302.2	Highway 1 – Wrigley	Fort Good Hope		—	—	Connects to Tulita (formerly Fort Norman), Norman Wells, Fort Good Hope, with 106 km branch route to Deline and 165 km branch route to Colville Lake. Thirty-four permanent bridges completed along route which can be used as part of an all-weather route.
Yellowknife Access Road	3.6	2.2	48th Street / 49th Avenue – Yellowknife	Giant Mine Boat Launch Access Road – Yellowknife	48th Street	—	—	
1.000 mi = 1.609 km; 1.000 km = 0.621 mi

== Local Highways ==
Local Highways
Number	Length (km)	Length (mi)	Southern or western terminus	Northern or eastern terminus	Local names	Formed	Removed	Notes
Canol Road	357	222	Norman Wells	Macmillan Pass, Yukon/Northwest Territories border		1943	1945	Second World War road completed early 1943, abandoned mid-1945, now the Canol Heritage Trail, connecting to the active Yukon Highway 6, the Canol Road
Canyon Creek Access Road	14.0	8.7	Canyon Creek	Mackenzie Valley Winter Road – Norman Wells		—	—	
Cassidy Point Road	4.1	2.5	Highway 4	Cassidy Point		—	—	
Fort Smith Campground Access Road	3.2	2.0	—	—		—	—	
Fish Camp Road	0.7	0.43	Highway 6	—		—	—	
Four Mile House Road	2.5	1.6	Highway 1	Liard River		—	—	
Giant Mine Boat Launch Access Road	0.34	0.21	Yellowknife Access Road – Yellowknife	—		—	—	
Great Slave Sailing Club Access Road	0.25	0.16	Yellowknife Access Road – Yellowknife	—		—	—	
Hart Lake Access Road	1.3	0.81	Hart Lake	Highway 1		—	—	
Jean Marie River Access Road	27.0	16.8	Highway 1	Jean Marie River		—	—	
Kakisa Lake Access Road	12.9	8.0	Parking lot at Kakisa Lake	Highway 1		—	—	
Little Buffalo River Falls Access Road	1.8	1.1	Highway 5	campsite at Little Buffalo River Falls		—	—	
Nagel Channel Road	7.2	4.5	Fort Resolution	—		—	—	
Prelude Lake West Access Road	1.2	0.75	Highway 4	Prelude Lake Territorial Park		—	—	
Prelude Lake East Access Road	1.7	1.1	Highway 4	—		—	—	
Salt River Access Road	15.5	9.6	Highway 5	—		—	—	
Sandy Lake Access Road	12.9	8.0	—	Highway 5		—	—	
Vee Lake Road	5.0	3.1	Highway 4	parking lot at Vee Lake		—	—	
1.000 mi = 1.609 km; 1.000 km = 0.621 mi

== Access by community ==
The communities reached by the all-weather highway network are:

- Behchoko (Rae-Edzo)
- Dettah
- Enterprise
- Fort Liard
- Fort McPherson
- Fort Providence
- Fort Resolution
- Fort Simpson
- Fort Smith
- Hay River
- Inuvik
- Jean Marie River
- Kakisa
- site of Pine Point
- Tsiigehtchic
- Tuktoyaktuk
- Wrigley
- Whatì
- Yellowknife

Communities that can only be reached by ice-road are:

- Aklavik
- Colville Lake
- Deline
- Gamèti
- Hay River Reserve
- Fort Good Hope
- Nahanni Butte
- Norman Wells
- Trout Lake
- Tulita
- Wekweeti

Communities with no access by surface vehicle:

- Lutselk'e
- Paulatuk
- Sachs Harbour
- Ulukhaktok
