= Tasr =

TASR may refer to:

- News Agency of the Slovak Republic (Slovak: Tlačová agentúra Slovenskej republiky), a Slovak news agency
- TASER International (NASDAQ: TASR), a developer, manufacturer, and distributor of less-lethal electroshock guns in the United States
- Tłı̨chǫ Highway, also known as the Tłı̨chǫ All-Season Road, a highway in Northwest Territories, Canada
