= Hay River Highway =

Highway in the Northwest Territories

Hay River Highway
- Northwest Territories Highway 2

Route information
- Maintained by Department of Transportation
- Length: 48.6 km (30.2 mi)

Major junctions
- South end: Highway 1 (Mackenzie Highway) in Enterprise
- Highway 5 (Fort Smith Highway) in Hay River
- North end: Wharf Site in Hay River

Location
- Country: Canada
- Territory: Northwest Territories

Highway system
- Northwest Territories highways
← Highway 1	→ Highway 3

The Hay River Highway, officially Northwest Territories Highway 2, is the shortest numbered highway in the Northwest Territories and connects Hay River to the junction of Highway 1 at Enterprise. Its total length is 48.6 km (30.2 mi), all of which is paved. 6.1 km (3.8 mi) south of downtown Hay River, there is a junction with Highway 5.

The highway was originally a portion of the Mackenzie Highway; this status ended with the extension of the highway northwest from Enterprise, first as a route around Great Slave Lake to Yellowknife, and then west to Fort Simpson.

The highway is one of the most "ruralized" highways in the N.W.T., with two subdivisions and one or two other clusters of homes.

The highway is designated as a core route of Canada's National Highway System.
