= Fort Smith Highway =

Highway in the Northwest Territories

Fort Smith Highway
- Northwest Territories Highway 5

Route information
- Maintained by Department of Transportation
- Length: 267.0 km (165.9 mi)

Major junctions
- West end: Highway 2 (Hay River Highway) at Hay River
- Highway 6 (Fort Resolution Highway) near Hay River
- East end: Highway 48 at the Alberta border at Fort Smith

Location
- Country: Canada
- Territory: Northwest Territories

Highway system
- Northwest Territories highways
← Highway 4	→ Highway 6

The Fort Smith Highway, officially Northwest Territories Highway 5, is a highway in Canada's Northwest Territories. Completed in 1966, the highway travels through Wood Buffalo National Park connecting Fort Smith to Hay River.

Since 2017, the highway has been fully paved.

== Connections ==
At the Alberta border it continues 22 km (14 mi) toward Smith Landing, Fitzgerald. It also connects to the Fort Smith Winter Road and other area roads going to Hay Camp and Peace Point, forming a circle route through Wood Buffalo National Park. The Fort Chipewyan Winter Road connects these further to the northern terminus of Alberta Highway 63 near Fort McKay.

Residents of Fort Chipewyan have petitioned the Alberta government for a 50 km (31 mi) road to connect with the area roads out of Fort Smith.
