= National Highway System (Canada) =

Road network in Canada

System information
- Length: 38,098 km (23,673 mi)
- Formed: 1988

Highway names
- Interprovincial: Trans-Canada Highway (TCH); Yellowhead Highway
- Provincial: Varies by province

System links
- Trans-Canada Highway; National Highway System

The National Highway System (French: Réseau routier national) in Canada is a federal designation for a strategic transport network of highways and freeways. The system includes but is not limited to the Trans-Canada Highway, and currently consists of 38,098 kilometres (23,673 mi) of roadway designated under one of three classes: Core Routes, Feeder Routes, or Northern and Remote Routes.

The Government of Canada maintains very little power or authority over the maintenance or expansion of the system beyond sharing part of the cost of economically significant projects within the network. Highways within the system are not given any special signage, except where they are part of a Trans-Canada Highway route.

== History ==
The system was first designated in 1988 by the Federal/Provincial/Territorial Council of Ministers Responsible for Transportation and Highway Safety, a council consisting of the federal, provincial and territorial Ministers of Transport. A total of 24,500 kilometres (15,200 mi) of highway were originally designated as part of the system. Highways selected for the system were existing primary routes that supported interprovincial and international trade and travel, by connecting major population or commercial centres with each other, with major border crossings on the Canada–United States border, or with other transport hubs.

The system was further expanded in 2004, with the addition of approximately 14,000 kilometres (8,700 mi) of highway that was not part of the original 1988 network. It was in this era that the current "core", "feeder" and "northern or remote" classes of route were established. In September 2006, the Council of Ministers Responsible for Transportation and Highway Safety approved a short set of Engineering Guidelines and Desired Objectives for the National Highway System (NHS). The document framed the NHS as critical corridors for Canada's economy and mobility, and states that new construction on NHS routes should aspire to nationally consistent objectives, while rehabilitation may use more local judgment for cost-effective reconstruction decisions.

== Standards ==
The 2006 engineering guidance identifies desired objectives for geometric design and operations, including access control, minimum design speeds by terrain, and typical minimum cross-section dimensions (for example, a 3.7 m (12 ft) minimum lane width on two-lane roads, and minimum shoulder widths with paved portions). The document also references national and pan-Canadian design and traffic-control standards, including the Canadian Highway Bridge Design Code for bridge design and the Transportation Association of Canada (TAC) manual for signing, markings, and traffic control devices. Not all highways within the system are designated in their entirety, but may instead be part of the system over only part of their length; a few highways even have two or more discontinuous segments designated as part of the system. In some locations, the National Highway System may also incorporate city arterial streets to connect highway routes which are part of the system but do not directly interconnect, or to link the system to an important intermodal transport hub; such as a shipping port, a railway terminal, an airport or a ferry terminal; which is not directly on a provincial-class highway.

Routes within the system continue to be maintained, funded and signed as provincial, rather than federal, highways. The only exceptions are highways through national parks and a portion of the Alaska Highway, which are managed by Parks Canada and Public Works and Government Services Canada, respectively. The National Highway System has been criticized for lacking a truly comprehensive expansion plan. In many parts of the country, the system relies on two-lane highways, or expressways which are not fully up to international freeway standards; according to Lakehead University economics professor Livio di Matteo, many parts of the system, even on the main Trans-Canada Highway portion of the network, still leave "the nation's east–west flow of personal and commercial traffic subject to the whims of an errant moose".

American transportation planning academic Wendell Cox has also identified improvements to the system, so that Canada would have a comprehensive national freeway network comparable to the American Interstate Highway System, as an economically critical project for the country to undertake in the 21st century. Cox notes that many Canadians prefer to drive between Western Canada and Eastern Canada by travelling through the United States rather than on Canadian highways; even though the distance may be longer than the Trans-Canada Highway route, as it frequently takes a shorter amount of time due to the US Interstate system's higher speed limits, increased lane capacity, higher number of alternative routes, and reduced likelihood of being delayed by a road accident.

=== Numbering system ===
The NHS is a federal designation of existing provincial and territorial highways and connecting links, rather than a separate nationwide route-numbering program. In the 2005 review, the system was organized into three route categories; Core, Feeder, and Northern/Remote; based on agreed criteria and thresholds, while route numbering remained under the existing provincial and territorial highway systems.

Transport Canada summarizes the three-category structure as follows:

- Core routes are key interprovincial and international corridors
- Feeder routes link other population and economic centres to the core
- Northern/Remote routes provide primary access linkages to northern and remote areas and related economic activity.

=== Signage ===
The 2006 NHS engineering guidance does not prescribe a unique NHS route marker. Instead, it directs jurisdictions to use national traffic-control device standards for signing and pavement marking (via the TAC Manual of Uniform Traffic Control Devices for Canada).

Where an NHS corridor is also part of the Trans-Canada Highway, jurisdictions may sign the route using Trans-Canada Highway markers in addition to provincial route markers. For example, Ontario's traffic manual states that the Trans-Canada Highway route marker is installed beside provincial route markers when a provincial highway forms part of the Trans-Canada Highway route.

=== Funding ===
Routes within the system continue to be maintained, funded and signed as provincial, rather than federal, highways. However, the federal government provides some funding assistance for important maintenance and expansion projects on designated highways through cost sharing programs. For instance, several recent maintenance projects on National Highway System routes in Saskatchewan were partly funded under the federal government's Building Canada Fund: Major Infrastructure Component, while several four-laning projects in Ontario in the 2000s accessed federal funding under the Strategic Highway Infrastructure Program. There is no single, ongoing program for federal contributions to the National Highway System; rather, these contributions have been made through a variety of separate infrastructure investment programs of defined length and scope. Recent transportation planning proposals have identified public-private partnerships and dedicated fuel taxes as possible mechanisms for providing more stable funding, although no comprehensive program has been implemented to date. There is no NHS-wide toll policy; tolling decisions are made through the authorities responsible for the specific facility.

- In Nova Scotia, the province eliminated tolls for Nova Scotia-registered vehicles using the Cobequid Pass highway (Highway 104) effective December 16, 2021.
- The Confederation Bridge (the fixed link between New Brunswick and Prince Edward Island) has been subject to federal measures affecting toll levels. Transport Canada briefing material stated that tolls were restrained at the 2022 rate of $50.25 per passenger vehicle under relief measures in the early 2020s. In July 2025, the Prime Minister's Office announced a reduction of Confederation Bridge tolls to $20 effective August 1, 2025, and the Parliamentary Budget Officer summarized the measure and effective date in later analysis.

== Statistics ==
=== Network size and composition ===
Following the 2005 review, the Task Force recommended a restructured NHS totalling 38,021 km (Core, Feeder, and Northern/Remote combined). It also reported that the proposed system represented 2.7% of Canada's highway network by length.

In the NHS Annual Report 2017 (published January 2019), the Council of Ministers reported a total NHS length of 38,098 km as of December 2017, and estimated that the NHS comprised about 3.7% of the length of Canada's public road network.

=== Traffic and travel ===
The 2017 annual report reported that in 2016 the NHS carried over 141 billion vehicle-kilometres of travel, including about 20 billion vehicle-kilometres of truck travel, and that total travel on the NHS increased 18% from 2005 to 2016.

=== Infrastructure and investment indicators ===
The 2017 annual report reported over $43 billion invested in the NHS since 2006/07 (through 2017/18 reporting), and stated that there were 10,805 bridges on the NHS in 2017.

== Routes ==
In its current form, the National Highway System includes routes in all Canadian provinces and territories except Nunavut, which has no conventional road connections to any other Canadian province or territory.

Officially the system maintains three classifications of road: Core, Feeder and Northern/Remote. Within the core and feeder classes, the system's official register made additional distinctions between conventional core or feeder routes and intermodal links or "anomalies", where a highway that does not meet the normal criteria for inclusion, or a municipal arterial road, has been adopted into the system to fill in a gap in the network. The "intermodal" and "anomaly" classes are not distinct designations, however, but simply represent an additional clarification of why the road holds "core" or "feeder" status. Since 2016, the "anomaly" category has been dropped and the road is simply included in the specific list. The tables below do not include "intermodal" municipal streets which connect major highways to intermodal facilities.

Note that some highways listed here may be designated as part of the National Highway System over only a portion of their total length, rather than over the whole highway. Termini listed below are those of a highway's NHS designation only, and may not necessarily always correspond to the termini of the highway as a whole. Transport Canada publishes a jurisdiction-by-jurisdiction summary of NHS route lengths (Core, Feeder, and Northern/Remote) as of September 2005.

=== Alberta ===
The system includes 4,545 kilometres (2,824 mi) of highway within Alberta.

Route	Class	Length (km)	Length (mi)	Southern or western terminus	Northern or eastern terminus	Name(s)	Notes
Highway 1 (TCH)	Core	534	332	British Columbia border (Highway 1)	Saskatchewan border (Highway 1)	Trans-Canada Highway	Entire route.
Highway 2	Core	447	278	Hwy 3 in Fort Macleod	Hwy 216 in Edmonton	Queen Elizabeth II Highway (Calgary – Edmonton)	Part of CANAMEX Corridor.
Highway 2	Core	82	51	Hwy 49 near Donnelly	Hwy 35 near Grimshaw		Part of corridor connecting Hwy 43 with the Mackenzie Hwy.
Highway 3	Core	324	201	British Columbia border (Hwy 3)	Hwy 1 in Medicine Hat	Crowsnest Highway	Entire route.
Highway 4	Core	103	64	Canada-U.S. border (I-15)	Hwy 3 in Lethbridge		Part of CANAMEX Corridor
Highway 9	Core	324	201	Hwy 1 near Calgary	Saskatchewan border (Highway 7)		Entire route
Highway 15	Core	14	9	Hwy 16 in Edmonton	Hwy 28A in Edmonton		Part of Edmonton-Fort McMurray corridor.
Highway 16 (TCH)	Core	634	394	British Columbia border (Highway 16)	Saskatchewan border (Highway 16)	Yellowhead Highway; Trans-Canada Highway	Entire route.
Highway 28	Core	37	23	Hwy 28A in Gibbons	Hwy 63 near Radway		Part of Edmonton-Fort McMurray corridor.
Highway 28	Feeder	253	157	Hwy 63 near Radway	Cold Lake		
Highway 28A	Core	18	11	Hwy 15 in Edmonton	Hwy 28A in Gibbons		Part of Edmonton-Fort McMurray corridor.
Highway 35	Core	465	289	Hwy 2 near Grimshaw	NWT border (Highway 1)	Mackenzie Highway	Entire route.
Highway 43	Core	497	309	British Columbia border (Highway 2)	Hwy 16 near Stony Plain		Entire route; part of CANAMEX Corridor.
Highway 49	Core	77	48	Hwy 2 near Donnelly	Hwy 43 in Valleyview		Part of corridor connecting Hwy 43 with the Mackenzie Hwy.
Highway 58	Northern / Remote	197	122	Rainbow Lake	Hwy 88 near Fort Vermilion		
Highway 63	Core	360	220	Hwy 28 near Redwater	Fort McMurray		Part of Edmonton-Fort McMurray corridor.
Highway 201	Core	101	63	Calgary ring road		Stoney Trail, Tsuut'ina Trail	
Highway 216	Core	78	48	Edmonton ring road		Anthony Henday Drive	

=== British Columbia ===
The system includes 7,040 kilometres (4,370 mi) of highway in British Columbia.

Route	Class	Length (km)	Length (mi)	Southern or western terminus	Northern or eastern terminus	Name(s)	Notes
Highway 1 (TCH)	Core	993	617	Victoria	Alberta border (Highway 1)	Trans-Canada Highway	Entire route; includes ferry between Nanaimo and West Vancouver.
Highway 2	Core	42	26	Hwy 97 in Dawson Creek	Alberta border (Highway 43)	Dawson Creek-Tupper Highway	Part of CANAMEX Corridor.
Highway 3	Core	838	521	Hwy 1 in Hope	Alberta border (Highway 3)	Crowsnest Highway	Entire route.
Highway 4	Feeder	38	24	Hwy 19 near Qualicum Beach	Port Alberni	Alberni Highway	
Highway 5	Core	531	330	Hwy 1 in Hope	Hwy 16 at Tête Jaune Cache	Southern Yellowhead Highway; Coquihalla Highway (Hope – Kamloops)	Entire route.
Highway 7	Core (Intermodal)	2	1	Hwy 7B in Port Coquitlam	Kennedy Road in Pitt Meadows	Lougheed Highway	Segment of the route to the C.P.R. Intermodal Transport Facility in Pitt Meadows. Provincial Highway.
Highway 7B	Core (Intermodal)	10	6	Hwy 7 in Coquitlam	Hwy 7 in Port Coquitlam	Mary Hill Bypass	Entire route. Segment of the route to the C.P.R. Intermodal Transport Facility in Pitt Meadows. Provincial Highway.
Highway 11	Core	3	2	Canada-U.S. border (SR 546)	Hwy 1 (TCH) in Abbotsford	Abbotsford-Huntingdon Highway	
Highway 15	Core	1.5	0.9	Canada-U.S. border (SR 543)	8th Avenue in Surrey	Pacific Highway	Part of corridor connecting the Pacific Highway Border Crossing and Hwy 99.
Highway 16 (TCH)	Core	1,072	666	Prince Rupert	Alberta border (Highway 16)	Yellowhead Highway; Trans-Canada Highway	Entire mainland section.
Highway 17	Core	46	29	Victoria	Hwy 99 in Delta	Patricia Bay Highway	Includes ferry between North Saanich and Delta.
Highway 17	;	31	19	Hwy 99 in Delta	Hwy 1 / Hwy 15 in Surrey	South Fraser Perimeter Road	Officially not listed part of N.H.S.; Hwy 17 extension.
Highway 19	Core	52	32	Duke Point ferry terminal near Nanaimo	Hwy 4A near Parksville	Inland Island Highway	
Highway 19	Feeder	119	74	Hwy 4A near Parksville	Hwy 28 in Campbell River	Inland Island Highway	
Highway 37	Feeder	58	36	Hwy 16 near Terrace	Kitimat	Kitimat-Terrace Highway	
Highway 37	Northern / Remote	723	449	Hwy 16 at Kitwanga	Yukon border (Hwy 37)	Stewart–Cassiar Highway	
Highway 95	Feeder	11	6.8	Canada-U.S. border (US 95)	Hwy 3 at Yahk	Yahk-Kingsgate Highway	
Highway 97	Feeder	109	68	Canada-U.S. border (US 97)	Hwy 97C at West Kelowna	Okanagan Highway	
Highway 97	Core	80	50	Hwy 97C in West Kelowna	Hwy 97A near Vernon	Okanagan Highway	
Highway 97	Core	1,810	1,120	Hwy 1 in Cache Creek	Yukon border (Hwy 1)	Cariboo Highway (Cache Creek – Prince George); John Hart Highway (Prince George – Dawson Creek); Alaska Highway (Dawson Creek – Yukon)	
Highway 97A	Core	65	40	Hwy 97 near Vernon	Hwy 1 in Sicamous	Sicamous Vernon Highway	Entire route.
Highway 97B	Core	14	8.7	Hwy 97A near Grindrod	Hwy 1 in Salmon Arm	Grinrod-Salmon Arm Highway	Entire route.
Highway 97C	Core	106	66	Hwy 97 in Peachland	Hwy 5 in Merritt	Okanagan Connector	
Highway 99	Core	170	110	Canada-U.S. border (I-5)	Whistler	Sea-to-Sky Highway (Whistler – Horseshoe Bay) Vancouver-Blaine Freeway (Richmond - U.S.A. Border; Taylor Way/Marine Drive (in West Vancouver)	Section through Vancouver is not provincially maintained.
Highway 101	Feeder	112	70	Langdale ferry terminal	Powell River	Sunshine Coast Highway	
8th Avenue	Core	1.5	0.9	Hwy 99 in Surrey	Hwy 15 in Surrey		Part of corridor connecting the Pacific Highway Border Crossing and Hwy 99.

=== Manitoba ===
The system includes 2,095 kilometres (1,302 mi) of highway in Manitoba.

Route	Class	Length (km)	Length (mi)	Southern or western terminus	Northern or eastern terminus	Name(s)	Notes
PTH 1 (TCH)	Core	489	304	Saskatchewan border (Highway 1)	Ontario border (Highway 17)	Trans-Canada Highway; Yellowhead Highway (Portage La Prairie – Winnipeg)	Entire route.
PTH 6	Feeder	732	455	PTH 101 near Winnipeg	Thompson		Entire route.
PTH 10	Core	41.5	25.8	PTH 1 in Brandon	PTH 16 near Minnedosa		
PTH 10	Northern / Remote	216	134	PTH 60 south of The Pas	Flin Flon		
PTH 16 (TCH)	Core	266	165	Saskatchewan border (Highway 16)	PTH 1 near Portage la Prairie	Yellowhead Highway; Trans-Canada Highway	Entire route.
PTH 60	Northern / Remote	152	94	PTH 10 south of The Pas	PTH 6 south of Grand Rapids		Entire route.
PTH 75	Core	101	63	Canada-U.S. border (I-29)	PTH 100 in Winnipeg	Lord Selkirk Highway	Entire route.
PTH 100 (TCH)	;	40	25	Winnipeg beltway south of PTH 1		Perimeter Highway	Officially not listed part of N.H.S.; part of the Trans-Canada Highway.
PTH 101	Core	50	31	Winnipeg beltway north of PTH 1		Perimeter Highway	Entire route.
PTH 190	Core	10	6	PTH 101 near Winnipeg	Winnipeg	CentrePort Canada Way	Entire route; intermodal connection.
Route 90	Core	11	7	PTH 101 / PTH 7 near Winnipeg	James Richardson Int. Airport		Intermodal connection.

=== New Brunswick ===
The system includes 1,802 kilometres (1,120 mi) of highway in New Brunswick.

Route	Class	Length (km)	Length (mi)	Southern or western terminus	Northern or eastern terminus	Name(s)	Notes
Route 1	Core	239	149	Canada-U.S. border	Route 2 near Three Rivers		Entire route.
Route 2 (TCH)	Core	515	320	Quebec border (A-85)	Nova Scotia border (Hwy 104)	Trans-Canada Highway	Entire route.
Route 7	Core	89	55	Route 1 in Saint John	Route 2 near Fredericton	Vanier Highway	
Route 8	Feeder	255	158	Route 2 near Fredericton	Route 11 in Bathurst	Entire route.	
Route 11	Feeder	415	258	Route 15 in Shediac	Route 17 near Campbellton		
Route 15	Core	60	37	Moncton	Route 16 in Strait Shores		
Route 16 (TCH)	Core	58	36	Route 2 at Aulac	P.E.I. border (Route 1)	Trans-Canada Highway	Includes NB portion of the Confederation Bridge.
Route 17	Feeder	147	91	Route 2 at Saint-Léonard	Route 11 near Campbellton		
Route 95	Core	15	9	Canada-U.S. border (I-95 / US 2)	Route 2 in Woodstock		Entire route.
Route 111	Core	10	6	Route 1 at Rothesay	Saint John Airport		Intermodule connection.

=== Newfoundland and Labrador ===
The system includes 2,467 kilometres (1,533 mi) of highway in Newfoundland and Labrador.

Route	Class	Length (km)	Length (mi)	Southern or western terminus	Northern or eastern terminus	Name(s)	Notes
Route 1 (TCH)	Core	903	561	Channel-Port aux Basques ferry terminal (connects to Nova Scotia)	Route 30 in St. John's	Trans-Canada Highway	Entire route.
Route 2	Core	15	9	Route 1 in St. John's	Port of St. John's	Pitts Memorial Drive	
Route 40	Core	1.3	0.8	Route 1 in St. John's	St. John's International Airport	Portugal Cove Road	
Route 100	Core	44	27	Argentia ferry terminal (connects to Nova Scotia)	Route 1 at Whitbourne		Ferry connection to Nova Scotia operates seasonally during the summer (June–September).
Route 340	Core	15	9	Route 1 near Lewisporte	Lewisporte	Road to the Isles	
Route 350	Core	18	11	Route 1 near Bishop's Falls	Botwood		
Route 450A	Core	4	2	Route 1 in Corner Brook	Riverside Drive		Intermodule link to the Port of Corner Brook.
Route 430	Feeder	298	185	Route 1 in Deer Lake	St. Barbe ferry terminal		Ferry connection to Blanc-Sablon, Quebec
Route 500	Northern / Remote	536	333	Quebec border (R-389)	Route 510 at Happy Valley-Goose Bay	Trans-Labrador Highway	
Route 510	Northern / Remote	610	380	Quebec border (R-138)	Route 500 at Happy Valley-Goose Bay	Trans-Labrador Highway	Entire route; excludes 5 km (3 mi) section of Quebec Route 138; ferry connection to St. Barbe.

=== Northwest Territories ===
The system includes 1,423 kilometres (884 mi) of highway in the Northwest Territories.

Route	Class	Length (km)	Length (mi)	Southern or western terminus	Northern or eastern terminus	Name(s)	Notes
Highway 1	Core	186	116	Alberta border (Highway 35)	Highway 3 near Fort Providence	Mackenzie Highway	
Highway 1	Northern / Remote	478	297	Highway 3 near Fort Providence	Wrigley	Mackenzie Highway	
Highway 2	Core	38	24	Highway 1 at Enterprise	Hay River	Hay River Highway	Entire route.
Highway 3	Core	339	211	Highway 3 near Fort Providence	Highway 4 at Yellowknife	Yellowknife Highway	Entire route.
Highway 4	Northern / Remote	69	43	Highway 3 at Yellowknife	Tibbitt Lake	Ingraham Trail	Entire route.
Highway 8	Northern / Remote	271	168	Yukon border (Hwy 5)	Inuvik	Dempster Highway	Entire route.

=== Nova Scotia ===
The system includes 1,199 kilometres (745 mi) of highway in Nova Scotia.

Route	Class	Length (km)	Length (mi)	Southern or western terminus	Northern or eastern terminus	Name(s)	Notes
Hwy 101	Core	310	190	Hwy 102 / Trunk 1 in Bedford	Trunk 3 in Yarmouth		Entire route.
Hwy 102	Core	101	63	Halifax	Hwy 104 in Truro		Entire route.
Hwy 103	Feeder	89	55	Hwy 102 in Halifax	Yarmouth		Entire route.
Hwy 104 (TCH)	Core	246	153	New Brunswick border (Route 2)	Hwy 105 / Trunk 19 at Port Hastings	Trans-Canada Highway	Entire route.
Hwy 104	Core	76	47	Hwy 105 / Trunk 19 at Port Hastings	Trunk 4 at River Tillard		Entire route.
Hwy 105 (TCH)	Core	3	2	Hwy 125 near Sydney Mines	North Sydney ferry terminal (connects to Newfoundland)	Trans-Canada Highway; Mabel and Alexander Graham Bell Way	
Hwy 105 (TCH)	;	139	86	Hwy 104 / Trunk 19 at Port Hastings	Hwy 125 near Sydney Mines	Trans-Canada Highway; Mabel and Alexander Graham Bell Way	Officially not listed part of N.H.S.; part of the Trans-Canada Highway.
Hwy 106 (TCH)	Core	19	12	Route 15 in Shediac	Caribou ferry terminal (connects to P.E.I.)	Trans-Canada Highway; Jubilee Highway	Entire route.
Hwy 111	Core	3	2	Victoria Road (Route 322) in Dartmouth	Hwy 111 in Dartmouth	Circumferential Highway	
Hwy 111	Feeder	6	4	Hwy 111 in Dartmouth	Pleasant Street (Route 322) in Dartmouth	Circumferential Highway	
Hwy 118	Core	16	10	Hwy 111 in Dartmouth	Hwy 102 near Fall River		Entire route.
Hwy 125	Core	19	12	Hwy 105 in Sydney Mines	Trunk 4 in Sydney River	Peacekeepers Way	
Trunk 4	Core	85	53	Hwy 104 at River Tillard	Hwy 125 in Sydney River		
Route 303	Core	11	7	Hwy 101 at Conway	Digby Ferry		

=== Ontario ===
The system includes 6,795 kilometres (4,222 mi) of highway in Ontario.

Route	Class	Length (km)	Length (mi)	Southern or western terminus	Northern or eastern terminus	Name(s)	Notes
Highway 400 / TCH	Core	224	139	Highway 401 in Toronto	Highway 69 near Carling	Trans-Canada Highway (Severn – Carling)	Entire route.
Highway 401	Core	823	511	Highway 3 in Windsor	Quebec border (A-20)	Macdonald–Cartier Freeway	Entire route.
Highway 402	Core	103	64	Canada-U.S. border (I-69 / I-94) (Blue Water Bridge)	Highway 401 in London		Entire route.
Highway 403	Core	125	78	Highway 401 near Woodstock	Highway 401 / Highway 410 in Mississauga	Alexander Graham Bell Parkway (Woodstock – Burlington)	Entire route; includes 17 km (11 mi) concurrency with QEW.
Highway 405	Core	9	6	QEW in St. Catharines	Canada-U.S. border (I-190) (Queenston-Lewiston Bridge)	General Brock Parkway	Entire route.
Highway 409	Core	4	2	Pearson Airport	Highway 401 in Toronto	Belfield Expressway	Entire route.
Highway 410	Core	20	12	Highway 401 / Highway 403 in Mississauga	Highway 10 north of Brampton		Entire route.
Highway 416	Core	76	47	Highway 401 in near Johnstown	Highway 417 in Ottawa	Veterans Memorial Highway	Entire route.
Highway 417 / TCH	Core	192	119	Quebec border (A-40)	Highway 17 near Arnprior	Trans-Canada Highway; The Queensway (within Ottawa)	Entire route.
Highway 420	Core	5	3	QEW in Niagara Falls	Canada-U.S. border (Rainbow Bridge)		Entire route; combined with Niagara Regional Road 420.
Highway 427	Core	27	17	QEW / Gardiner Expy in Toronto	Regional Road 7 (Highway 7) in Vaughan		
Queen Elizabeth Way	Core	139	86	Canada-U.S. border (Peace Bridge)	Highway 427 / Gardiner Expy. in Toronto	Unsigned Highway 451	Entire route
Highway 3	Core	11	7	Canada-U.S. border (Ambassador Bridge)	Highway 401 in Windsor	Huron Church Road	
Highway 3	Feeder	23	14	Highway 401 in Windsor	Highway 77 in Leamington		
Highway 3B (former)	Core	11	7	Canada-U.S. border (Detroit–Windsor Tunnel)	Highway 401 in Windsor	Dougall Avenue	
Highway 6	Core	41	25	Highway 403 in Hamilton	Highway 7 west (Woodlawn Road) in Guelph		
Highway 6	Core	10	6	John C. Munro Airport	Highway 403 in Hamilton		Intermodule connection.
Highway 7 / TCH	Core	41	25	Highway 12 in Brock	Highway 417 in Ottawa	Trans-Canada Highway	
Highway 7 / TCH	Core	21	13	Highway 8 in Kitchener	Highway 6 in Guelph		Excludes 45 km (28 mi) concurrency with Highway 8 between Kitchener and Stratford.
Highway 8	Core	53	33	Highway 7 in Stratford	Highway 401 in Cambridge		Includes 45 km (28 mi) concurrency with Highway 7 between Kitchener and Stratford.
Highway 10	Feeder	137	85	Highway 410 north of Brampton	Highway 26 in Owen Sound		Entire route.
Highway 11 / TCH	Core	1,232	766	Highway 400 in Barrie	Highway 17 in Nipigon	Trans-Canada Highway (North Bay – Nipigon)	Includes 4 km (2 mi) concurrency with Highway 17 in North Bay; excludes 179 km (111 mi) concurrency with Highway 17 between Nipigon and Shabaqua Corners.
Highway 11 / TCH	;	280	174	Highway 17 at Shabaqua Corners	Highway 71 in Fort Frances	Trans-Canada Highway	Not part of N.H.S., part of the Trans-Canada Highway; excludes 40 km (25 mi) concurrency with Highway 71.
Highway 12 / TCH	Core	80	50	Highway 7 in Brock	Highway 400 at Severn	Trans-Canada Highway	Excludes 6 km (4 mi) concurrency with Highway 400.
Highway 12 / TCH	Feeder	18	11	Highway 400 at Waubaushene	Highway 93 in Midland		Excludes 6 km (4 mi) concurrency with Highway 400.
Highway 16	Core	4	2	Canada-U.S. border (NY 812) (Ogdensburg-Prescott International Bridge)	Highway 401 near Johnstown		Entire route.
Highway 17 / TCH	Core	1,964	1,220	Highway 417 near Arnprior	Manitoba border (PTH 1)	Trans-Canada Highway	Entire route.
Highway 17B (former)	Core	11	7	Canada-U.S. border (Sault Ste. Marie International Bridge)	Highway 17 in Sault Ste. Marie		Possible subject to revision, truck route via Carman's Way and Highway 550.
Highway 19	Feeder	84	52	Highway 3 in Tillsonburg	Highway 401 near Ingersoll		Entire route
Highway 24	Feeder	36	22	Highway 3 in Simcoe	Highway 403 in Brantford		
Highway 26	Core	63	39	County Road 19 near Collingwood	Highway 400 in Barrie		
Highway 34	Core	59	37	Highway 417 near Hawkesbury	Quebec border (R-344)		Entire route.
Highway 61	Core	61	38	Canada-U.S. border (MN 61)	Highway 11 / Highway 17 in Thunder Bay		Entire route.
Highway 66 / TCH	Core	59	37	Quebec border (R-117)	Highway 11 near Swastika	Trans-Canada Highway	
Highway 69 / TCH	Core	162	101	Highway 400 in Carling	Highway 17 in Sudbury	Trans-Canada Highway	Entire route
Highway 71 / TCH	Core	194	121	Canada-U.S. border (US 53 / US 71) (Fort Frances–International Falls International Bridge)	Highway 17 near Kenora	Trans-Canada Highway (Fort Frances – Kenora)	Includes 40 km (25 mi) concurrency with Highway 11.
Highway 77	Feeder	84	52	Highway 3 in Leamington	Highway 401 in Lakeshore		Entire route
Highway 101	Feeder	84	52	Highway 144 in Timmins	Highway 11 in Matheson		
Highway 108	Core	27	17	Highway 17 near Serpent River	Elliot Lake		
Highway 115	Core	57	35	Highway 401 near Newcastle	Highway 7 in Peterborough		Entire route; includes 13 km (8 mi) concurrency with Highway 7.
Highway 137	Core	4	2	Canada-U.S. border (I-81) (Thousand Islands Bridge)	Highway 401 near Lansdowne		Entire route.
Highway 138	Feeder	39	24	Cornwall	Highway 417 near Casselman		Entire route; connects to Seaway International Bridge and U.S. border.
Highway 144	Feeder	272	169	Highway 17 in Sudbury	Highway 101 in Timmins		Entire route.
County Road 17	Feeder	10	6	Highway 34 in Hawkesbury	Highway 417 in East Hawkesbury		Former Highway 17.
Nicholas Street; Rideau Street; King Edward Avenue	Core	4	2	Highway 417 in Ottawa	Quebec border (A-5) (Macdonald-Cartier Bridge)		Ottawa city streets connecting Highway 417 (Queensway) and Autoroute 5 in Gatineau, QC.

=== Prince Edward Island ===
The system includes 398 kilometres (247 mi) of highway in Prince Edward Island.

Route	Class	Length (km)	Length (mi)	Southern or western terminus	Northern or eastern terminus	Name(s)	Notes
Route 1 (TCH)	Core	128	80	New Brunswick border (Route 16)	Wood Islands Ferry Terminal (connects to Nova Scotia)	Trans-Canada Highway	Entire route; includes PEI portion of the Confederation Bridge.
Route 1A	Core	20	12	Route 1 near Albany	Route 2 near Summerside		Entire route.
Route 2	Core	51	32	Summerside	Route 1 in Charlottetown		
Route 2	Feeder	7	4	Route 14 / Route 153 in Tignish	Summerside		
Route 2	Feeder	238	148	Route 1 in Charlottetown	Souris		
Route 3	Feeder	33	21	Route 1 at Cherry Valley	Georgetown		Entire route

=== Quebec ===
The system includes 5,647 kilometres (3,509 mi) of highway in Quebec.

Route	Class	Length (km)	Length (mi)	Southern or western terminus	Northern or eastern terminus	Name(s)	Notes
A-5	Core	0.8	0.5	Ontario border (King Edward Avenue) (Macdonald-Cartier Bridge)	A-50 in Gatineau		Continues along Ottawa city streets connecting to Ontario Highway 417.
A-10	Core	145	90	Route 136 in Montreal	A-55 in Sherbrooke		Entire route; includes 23 km (14 mi) concurrency with A-55 between Magog and Sherbrooke.
A-13	Core	89	55	A-20 in Montreal	A-640 in Boisbriand		Entire route.
A-15 (TCH)	Core	255	158	Canada-U.S. border (I-87)	Route 117 in Sainte-Agathe-des-Monts	Trans-Canada Highway (Montreal (A-40) – Sainte-Agathe-des-Monts)	Entire route.
A-20 (TCH)	Core	535	332	Ontario border (Highway 401)	Route 132 near L'Isle-Verte	Trans-Canada Highway (Montreal (A-25) – Rivière-du-Loup); Autoroute Jean-Lesage (Ontario border–Rimouski)	Entire route.
A-20 (TCH)	Core	45	28	Around Rimouski (bypasses Route 132)		Trans-Canada Highway (Montreal (A-25) – Rivière-du-Loup); Autoroute Jean-Lesage (Ontario border–Rimouski)	Entire route.
A-25 (TCH)	Core	8	5	A-20 in Longueuil	A-40 in Montreal	Trans-Canada Highway	
A-30	Core	5	3	A-40 in Vaudreuil-Dorion	A-20 in Vaudreuil-Dorion		Former A-540.
A-30	Feeder	58	36	A-20 in Boucherville	Route 133 in Sorel-Tracy		
A-30	;	79	49	A-20 in Vaudreuil-Dorion	A-20 in Boucherville		Officially not listed part of N.H.S.; A-30 extension.
A-31	Core	14	9	A-40 in Lavaltrie	Route 158 in Joliette		Entire route.
A-35	Core	40	25	Route 133 in Saint-Sébastien	A-10 in Carignan–Chambly		Entire route; future connection to I-89.
A-40 (TCH)	Core	347	216	Ontario border (Highway 417)	Route 138 / Route 368 in Quebec City	Trans-Canada Highway (Ontario – Montreal (A-25)); Autoroute Félix-Leclerc (Montreal – Quebec City)	Entire route.
A-50	Core	156	97	A-5 in Gatineau	A-15 in Mirabel	Autoroute Guy-Lafleur	
A-55	Core	247	153	Canada-U.S. border (I-91)	Route 155 in Shawinigan		Entire route; includes 23 km (14 mi) concurrency with A-10 and 36 km (22 mi) concurrency with A-20.
A-70	Core	7	4	Route 175 in Chicoutimi (Saguenay)	Route 170 near Bagotville Airport (Saguenay)		Intermodule connection to Port of Saguenay.
A-70	Feeder	23	14	Route 170 in Jonquière (Saguenay)	Route 175 in Chicoutimi (Saguenay)		Part of Shawinigan – Saguenay corridor.
A-73	Core	51	32	A-20 in Lévis	Route 175 in Stoneham-et-Tewkesbury		Includes 9 km (6 mi) concurrency with A-40 in Quebec City.
A-73	Feeder	87	54	Route 204 in Saint-Georges	A-20 in Lévis		Corridor connecting Quebec City with the Canada-U.S. border.
A-85 (TCH)	Core	58	36	New Brunswick border (Route 2)	A-20 near Rivière-du-Loup	Trans-Canada Highway; Autoroute Claude-Béchard	Entire route; 38 km (24 mi) gap, connect by Route 185.
A-440	Core	13	8	A-40 / A-73 in Quebec City	A-40 in Quebec City		4 km (2 mi) gap in A-440; connected Boulevard Charest.
A-520	Core	8	5	A-20 in Dorval	A-40 in Montreal	Autoroute Côte de Liesse	Entire route.
A-540	Core	5	3	A-73 in Quebec City	Aéroport Jean-Lesage	Autoroute Duplessis	Entire route.
A-610	Feeder	11	7	A-10 / A-55 in Sherbrooke	Route 112 in Sherbrooke	Autoroute Louis-Bilodeau	Entire route.
A-640	Core	35	22	A-13 in Boisbriand	A-40 near Terrebonne		
R-109	Northern / Remote	66	41	Route 111 in Amos	James Bay Road at Matagami		Part of Val-d'Or – Radisson corridor.
R-111	Northern / Remote	66	41	Route 117 in Val-d'Or	Route 109 in Amos		Part of Val-d'Or – Radisson corridor.
R-112	Feeder	149	93	A-610 in Sherbrooke	A-73 at Vallée-Jonction		
R-117 (TCH)	Core	571	355	Route 117 in Sainte-Agathe-des-Monts	Ontario border (Highway 66)	Trans-Canada Highway	
R-132	Core	11	7	A-15 / A-930 in Candiac	Route 138 in Kahnawake		Corridor connecting to Honoré Mercier Bridge.
R-132	Core	54	34	A-20 near L'Isle-Verte	A-20 west of Rimouski		Connects gap in A-20.
R-132	Core	58	36	A-20 east of Rimouski	Route 195 near Matane		
R-133	Core	42	26	Canada-U.S. border (I-89)	A-35 in Saint-Sébastien		Eventually to be replaced by A-35.
R-136	Core	9	6	A-15 / A-20 in Montreal	Rue Notre-Dame in Montreal	Autoroute Ville-Marie (formerly A-720)	
R-136	Core	12	7	A-73 in Quebec City	A-440 in Quebec City	Boulevard Champlain	Entire route.
R-138	Core	5	3	Route 138 in Kahnawake	A-20 in Montreal		Corridor connecting to Honoré Mercier Bridge.
R-138	Core	632	393	A-40 / Route 368 in Quebec City	Sept-Îles		
R-138	Northern / Remote	5	3	Blanc-Sablon ferry terminal	Labrador border (Route 510)		Quebec extension of Trans-Labrador Highway; ferry connection to St. Barbe, NL.
R-139	Feeder	24	15	Route 104 in Cowansville	Route 112 in Granby		
R-155	Feeder	251	156	A-55 in Shawinigan	Route 169 near Chambord		Part of Shawinigan – Saguenay corridor.
R-161	Feeder	26	16	Victoriaville	A-20 in Daveluyville		
R-169	Feeder	20	12	Route 155 at Chambord	Route 170 at Métabetchouan–Lac-à-la-Croix		Part of Shawinigan – Saguenay corridor.
R-169	Feeder	9	6	Route 170 at Hébertville	Alma		
R-170	Core	11	7	A-70 near Bagotville Airport (Saguenay)	La Baie (Saguenay)		Intermodule connection to Port of Saguenay.
R-170	Feeder	25	16	Route 169 at Hébertville	A-70 in Saguenay		Part of Shawinigan – Saguenay corridor.
R-173	Feeder	48	30	Route 204 at Saint-Georges	Canada-U.S. border (US 201)		Corridor connecting Quebec City with the Canada-U.S. border.
R-175	Core	415	258	A-73 in Stoneham-et-Tewkesbury	Route 372 in Saguenay		
R-185 (TCH)	Core	38	24	A-85 in Saint-Louis-du-Ha! Ha!	A-85 in Saint-Antonin	Trans-Canada Highway	Eventually to be replaced by A-85.
R-201	Feeder	13	8	A-20 in Coteau-du-Lac	A-530 in Salaberry-de-Valleyfield		
R-204	Feeder	4	2	Route 173 at Saint-Georges	A-73 at Saint-Georges		Corridor connecting Quebec City with the Canada-U.S. border.
R-389	Northern / Remote	567	352	Route 138 at Baie-Comeau	Labrador border (Route 500)		Entire route.
James Bay Road	Northern / Remote	620	390	Route 109 at Matagami	Radisson		Part of Val-d'Or – Radisson corridor.

=== Saskatchewan ===
The system includes 2,689 kilometres (1,671 mi) of highway in Saskatchewan.

Route	Class	Length (km)	Length (mi)	Southern or western terminus	Northern or eastern terminus	Name(s)	Notes
Highway 1 (TCH)	Core	648	403	Alberta border (Highway 1)	Manitoba border (Highway 1)	Trans-Canada Highway	Entire route.
Highway 2	Core	51	32	Hwy 1 in Moose Jaw	Hwy 11 at Chamberlain	Veterans Memorial Highway	
Highway 2	Core	7	4	Hwy 11 near Prince Albert	Hwy 3 / Hwy 302 in Prince Albert	Veterans Memorial Highway	
Highway 2	Northern / Remote	238	148	Hwy 3 / Hwy 302 in Prince Albert	Hwy 102 in La Ronge	CanAm Highway	
Highway 6	Core	42	26	Hwy 39 at Corinne	Hwy 1 in Regina	CanAm Highway	Regina – Weyburn – Estevan corridor.
Highway 7	Core	258	160	Alberta border (Highway 9)	Hwy 11 / Hwy 16 in Saskatoon		Entire route
Highway 10	Core	160	99	Hwy 1 near Balgonie	Hwy 16 in Yorkton		
Highway 11	Core	392	244	Hwy 1 in Regina	Hwy 2 south Prince Albert	Louis Riel Trail	Entire route
Highway 16 (TCH)	Core	689	428	Alberta border (Highway 16)	Manitoba border (Highway 16)	Yellowhead Highway; Trans-Canada Highway	Entire route.
Highway 39	Core	195	121	Canada-U.S. border (US 52)	Hwy 6 at Corinne	CanAm Highway (Corinne – Weyburn)	Regina – Weyburn – Estevan corridor.

=== Yukon ===
The system includes 2,017 kilometres (1,253 mi) of highway in Yukon.

Route	Class	Length (km)	Length (mi)	Southern or western terminus	Northern or eastern terminus	Name(s)	Notes
Hwy 1	Core	892	554	British Columbia border (Highway 97)	Alaska border (AK-2)	Alaska Highway	Entire route.
Hwy 2	Feeder	77	48	Alaska border (AK-98)	Hwy 1 south of Whitehorse	(South) Klondike Highway	
Hwy 2	Northern / Remote	478	297	Hwy 1 north of Whitehorse	Hwy 5 south of Dawson City	(North) Klondike Highway	
Hwy 5	Northern / Remote	465	289	Hwy 2 south of Dawson City	Northwest Territories border (Highway 8)	Dempster Highway	Entire route.
Hwy 37	Northern / Remote	3	2	British Columbia border (Highway 37)	Hwy 1 near Upper Liard	Stewart–Cassiar Highway	Entire route.

== Impact and reception ==
Government reporting frames the NHS as a set of corridors and linkages that are vital to national mobility and to economic activity, including trade and travel between provinces and across major international border crossings.

The 2005 Task Force review argued that Canada depends heavily on highways for trade, commerce, and mobility, and described the highway system as the primary means of access to and from large regions of the country. The Task Force also noted that the growing connection between NHS designation and eligibility under federal infrastructure programs increased the importance of clarifying route eligibility criteria and thresholds.

The same review documented unresolved policy questions and differing viewpoints during system development, including whether and how to treat major corridors within large metropolitan areas, and how to define "performance characteristics" and minimum service standards across a wide range of operating environments (from urban corridors to northern and remote routes).

== See also ==
- National Highway System (United States)
