= Liard Highway =

Highway between BC and the Northwest Territories in Canada

Liard Highway
- British Columbia Highway 77; Northwest Territories Highway 7

Route information
- Length: 393 km (244 mi)
- Existed: 1984–present

Major junctions
- South end: Highway 97 near Fort Nelson, BC
- North end: Highway 1 near Fort Simpson, NT

Location
- Country: Canada
- Provinces: British Columbia, Northwest Territories

Highway system
- British Columbia provincial highways
- Northwest Territories highways
← Highway 62	→ Highway 91
← Highway 6	→ Highway 8

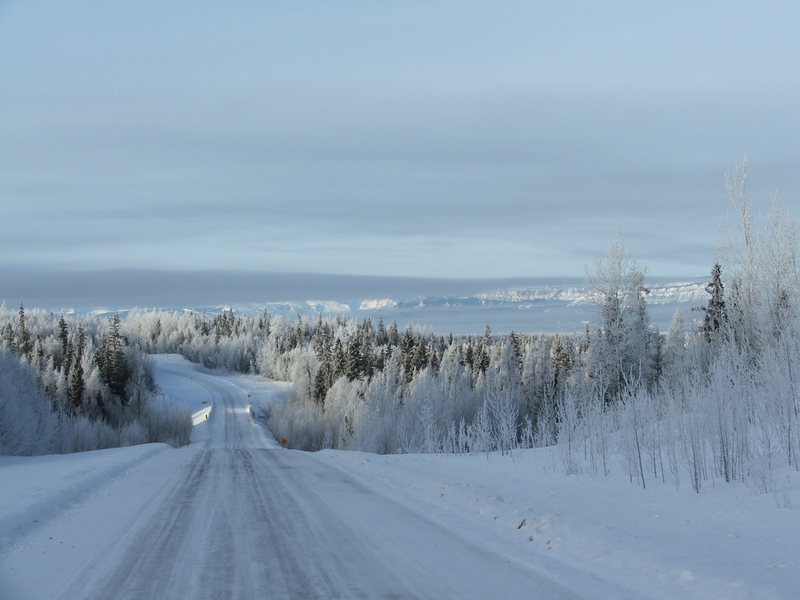
Liard Highway in winter

The Liard Highway (designated Highway 77 in British Columbia and Highway 7 in the Northwest Territories) is a 378 km two-lane highway in Canada that is the only direct road link between British Columbia and the Northwest Territories. Passing through sparsely populated areas of boreal forest, it serves as the sole land access route for the communities of Fort Liard and Nahanni Butte.

== Route ==
The highway begins at a point on the Alaska Highway 28 km (17 mi) northwest of Fort Nelson and runs 138 km (86 mi) northeast through expanses of the Canadian Boreal Forest to the border of British Columbia and the Northwest Territories. Beyond the border, it continues for 254 km (158 mi) as NWT Highway 7. It terminates at a junction with Territorial Highway 1 south of Fort Simpson.

== History ==
The highway was built between 1975 and 1982 and was officially opened to traffic in June 1984. The section in British Columbia was built under contracts with the Ministry of Transportation and Highways at a cost of $26 million (equivalent to $70.45 million in 2021). The section through the Northwest Territories section was built by the federal government at a cost of $55 million (equivalent to $149.03 million in 2021). British Columbia assigned the number 77 to its portion of the route in 1984.

In 2012, Peters Bros. Construction Ltd. was awarded a contract valued at $8,911,212.00 to pave (level course and overlay) over the existing sealcoat from the end of the existing pavement at 83 km (52 mi) in British Columbia to the border with the Northwest Territories, at 137 km (85 mi). The project was completed in August 2012.

As of 2018, Highway 77 has been fully paved up to the border with the Northwest Territories.

== Major intersections ==
Province / Territory	Regional municipality / Region	Location	km	mi	Destinations	Notes
British Columbia	Northern Rockies		0	0.0	Highway 97 (Alaska Highway) – Fort Nelson, Fort St. John, Whitehorse	Southern terminus of Liard Highway
British Columbia	Northern Rockies		42	26	Crosses the Fort Nelson River	
British Columbia–Northwest Territories border			138 0	86 0.0	Northern terminus of Highway 77; southern terminus of Highway 7	
Northwest Territories	Dehcho	Fort Liard	38	24	Access road	
Northwest Territories	Dehcho		131	81	Nahanni Butte access road	
Northwest Territories	Dehcho	Checkpoint	255	158	Highway 1 (Mackenzie Highway) – Fort Simpson, Fort Providence, Hay River	Northern terminus of Liard Highway
1.000 mi = 1.609 km; 1.000 km = 0.621 mi: Route transition
