= Fort Resolution Highway =

Highway in the Northwest Territories

Fort Resolution Highway
- Northwest Territories Highway 6

Route information
- Maintained by Department of Transportation
- Length: 90.0 km (55.9 mi)

Major junctions
- West end: Highway 5 (Fort Smith Highway) near Hay River
- North end: Fort Resolution

Location
- Country: Canada
- Territory: Northwest Territories

Highway system
- Northwest Territories highways
← Highway 5	→ Highway 7

The Fort Resolution Highway, officially Northwest Territories Highway 6, is a highway following the shore of Great Slave Lake from the Buffalo River Junction (Highway 5) to Fort Resolution in Canada's Northwest Territories.

Just 21.3 km (13.2 mi) east of Buffalo River Junction is the site of Pine Point, a town that served the lead-zinc mine in the vicinity. The town was one of the largest in the N.W.T., such that residents had very little reason to drive to Hay River, so complete were the services and products available. The mine closed in 1987, and in 1988 the town was closed, dismantled and abandoned. Only a network of urban streets remains.
