= Mackenzie Highway =

Highway in the Northwest Territories and Alberta

Mackenzie Highway
- Alberta Highway 35; Northwest Territories Highway 1
- Mackenzie Highway highlighted in red.

Route information
- Length: 1,160 km (720 mi)

Major junctions
- South end: Highway 2A in Grimshaw, AB
- Highway 2 near Grimshaw, AB; Highway 986 near Grimshaw, AB; Highway 697 near Paddle Prairie, AB; Highway 58 at High Level, AB; Highway 2 at Enterprise, NT; Highway 3 near Fort Providence, NT; Highway 7 near Fort Simpson, NT
- North end: Wrigley, NT

Location
- Country: Canada
- Provinces: Alberta, Northwest Territories

Highway system
- Alberta Numbered Highway Network; List; Former
- Northwest Territories highways
← Highway 33	AB Hwy 35	→ Highway 36
← Highway 10	NT Hwy 1	→ Highway 2

The Mackenzie Highway is a Canadian highway in northern Alberta and the Northwest Territories. It begins as Alberta Highway 2 at Mile Zero in Grimshaw, Alberta. After the first 4.0 km (2.5 mi), it becomes Alberta Highway 35 for the balance of its length through Alberta and then becomes Northwest Territories Highway 1.

== Route description ==
The Mackenzie Highway is designated as part of Canada's National Highway System, holding core route status from its terminus at Grimshaw to its intersection with the Yellowknife Highway, and northern/remote route status for the remainder of the route to its northern terminus at Wrigley.

Originally begun in 1938, prior to World War II, the project was abandoned at the outbreak of war. It resumed in the late 1940s and completed to Hay River, Northwest Territories, in 1948/1949, but some sections, particularly in the vicinity of Steen River, remained difficult.

In 1960, it was extended from Enterprise, approximately 39 km (24 mi) south of Hay River, to the northwest, then north past Fort Providence to Behchokǫ̀ (at the time, known as Rae-Edzo) and southeast to the City of Yellowknife, which became the capital of the Northwest Territories in 1967. Much of the extension is now known as Northwest Territories Highway 3, or the Yellowknife Highway. The 39 km (24 mi) stretch from Enterprise to Hay River is Northwest Territories Highway 2.

Around 1970, the highway was extended west from what is now the southern terminus of Highway 3 to reach Fort Simpson, and in 1971, when the section to Fort Simpson was opened to traffic, work began to prepare a road grade from there to Wrigley, and subsequently to join the Dempster Highway south of Inuvik, but the work was abandoned in 1977. The roadway, which starts at a junction 3.5 km (2.2 mi) from the island that includes "downtown" Fort Simpson, was finally extended to Wrigley in 1994 and includes the N'dulee ferry and ice crossings.

On November 8, 2013, the portion of the highway from the Alberta/Northwest Territories border to Enterprise was designated the Highway of Heroes.

Just east of Fort Simpson's airport, the highway crosses the Liard River by ferry (summer) and ice bridge (winter). 45 km (28 mi) further east of the crossing, the location known as Checkpoint is the site of a former gas station at the junction with the Liard Highway (Northwest Territories Highway 7, British Columbia Highway 77) from Fort Nelson, British Columbia.

== Extension ==
There are social and economic studies being done on the extension of the highway north from Wrigley to join the Dempster Highway; the territorial government has completed 34 bridges across all but six of the widest river crossings that serve the ice road and await the all-weather route. In June 2018, an announcement of $140 million funding would result in a bridge over Great Bear River and extend the Mackenzie Highway's all-weather road north by 15 km to Mount Gaudet.

In March 2026, Prime Minister Mark Carney announced that the Mackenzie Highway would be extended all the way to Inuvik, with work to begin in summer 2026.

== Major intersections ==
Province / Territory	Municipality / Region	Location	km	mi	Destinations	Notes
Alberta	M.D. of Peace No. 135	Grimshaw	0	0.0	Highway 2A east (55 Avenue) – Peace River Highway 2 south – Fairview, Grande Prairie	Mile Zero Mackenzie Highway.
Alberta	M.D. of Peace No. 135		4	2.5	Highway 2 east – Peace River, Edmonton	Hwy 2 branches east; Mackenzie Hwy follows Hwy 35; south end of National Highway System Core Route.
Alberta	Northern Lights		13	8.1	Highway 737 west (Warrensville Road)	
Alberta	Northern Lights		20	12	Highway 986 east – Little Buffalo, Red Earth Creek	
Alberta	Northern Lights	Dixonville	39	24	Highway 689 west	
Alberta	Northern Lights		62	39	Highway 690 east – Deadwood	
Alberta	Northern Lights	Manning	82	51	Highway 691 east	
Alberta	Northern Lights		120	75	Highway 692 east – Notikewin Provincial Park	
Alberta	Northern Lights		179	111	Highway 695 east – Carcajou	South end of Hwy 695 concurrency.
Alberta	Northern Lights		186	116	Highway 695 west – Keg River	North end of Hwy 695 concurrency.
Alberta	Northern Lights		219	136	Highway 697 east – Tompkins Landing Ferry, La Crete, Fort Vermilion	
Alberta	Mackenzie	High Level	278	173	Highway 58 west – Rainbow Lake, Assumption	South end of Hwy 58 concurrency
Alberta	Mackenzie	High Level	279	173	Highway 58 east – Fort Vermilion, La Crete, John D'or Prairie	North end of Hwy 58 concurrency
Alberta	Mackenzie		363	226	Crosses Hay River	
Alberta	Mackenzie		364	226	Zama Road – Zama City	
Alberta–Northwest Territories border			469 0	291 0.0	Northern terminus of Highway 35; southern terminus of Highway 1	
Northwest Territories	South Slave	Enterprise	83	52	Highway 2 north (Hay River Highway) – Hay River, Fort Smith	Hwy 1 turns west.
Northwest Territories	South Slave		167	104	Kakisa Access Road – Kakisa	
Northwest Territories	South Slave		168	104	Crosses Kakisa River	
Northwest Territories	South Slave		186	116	Highway 3 north (Yellowknife Highway) – Fort Providence, Yellowknife	North end of National Highway System Core Route; south end of Northern & Remote Route.
Northwest Territories	Dehcho		324	201	Crosses Trout River	
Northwest Territories	Dehcho		376	234	Jean Marie River Access Road – Jean Marie River	
Northwest Territories	Dehcho	Checkpoint	412	256	Highway 7 south (Liard Highway) – Fort Liard, Fort Nelson	Hwy 1 turns north.
Northwest Territories	Dehcho		457	284	MV Lafferty Ferry (mid/late May to late October); Ice bridge (late November to mid April)	Crossing over the Liard River
Northwest Territories	Dehcho	Fort Simpson	472	293	Fort Simpson Access Road	Hwy 1 branches northwest.
Northwest Territories	Dehcho		489	304	Crosses Martin River	
Northwest Territories	Dehcho	N’Dulee Crossing	548	341	MV Johnny Berens Ferry (late May to late October); Ice bridge (mid December to mid April)	Crossing over the Mackenzie River
Northwest Territories	Dehcho		627	390	Crosses Willowlake River	
Northwest Territories	Dehcho	Wrigley	690	430	winter road – Norman Wells, Fort Good Hope, Colville Lake	Northern terminus of Mackenzie Highway
1.000 mi = 1.609 km; 1.000 km = 0.621 mi: Concurrency terminus; Route transition

== Photo gallery ==
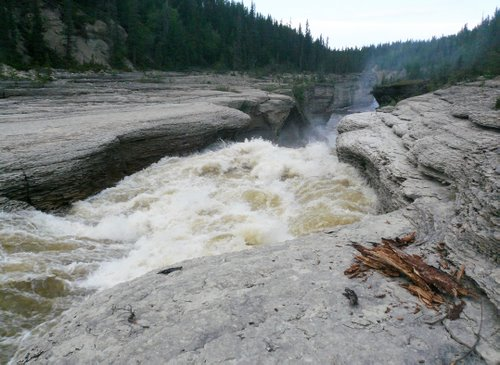
Rapids on Trout River, from Mackenzie Highway
61°8′42″N 119°50′46″W

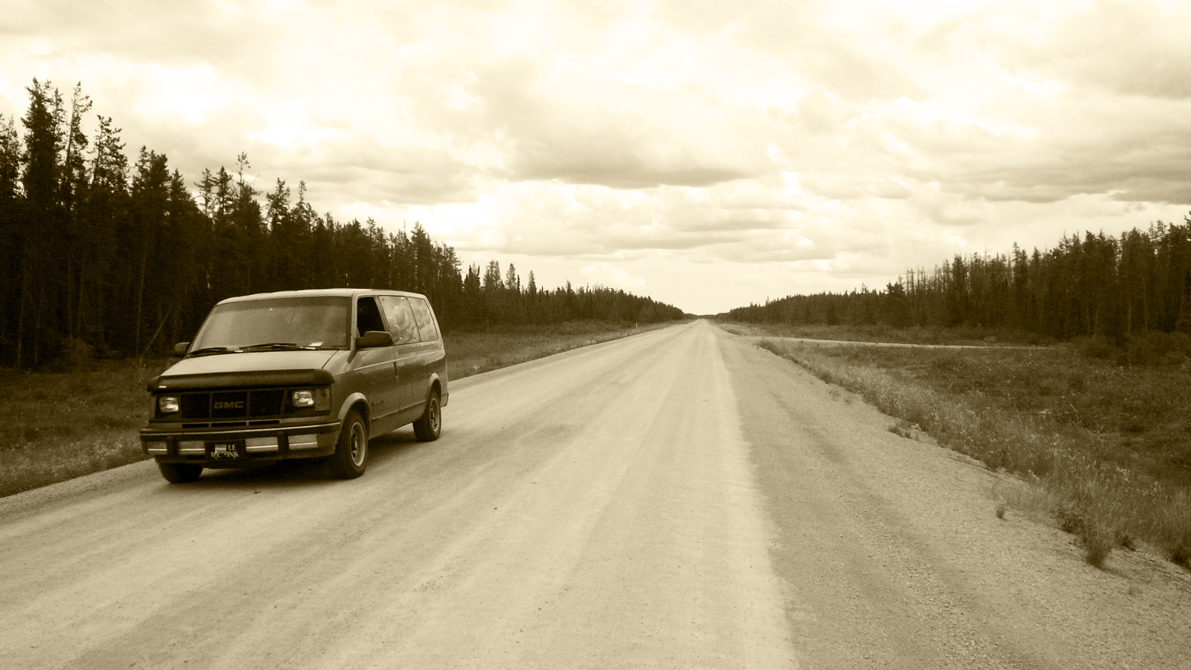
The Mackenzie Highway
61°8′35″N 119°10′28″W

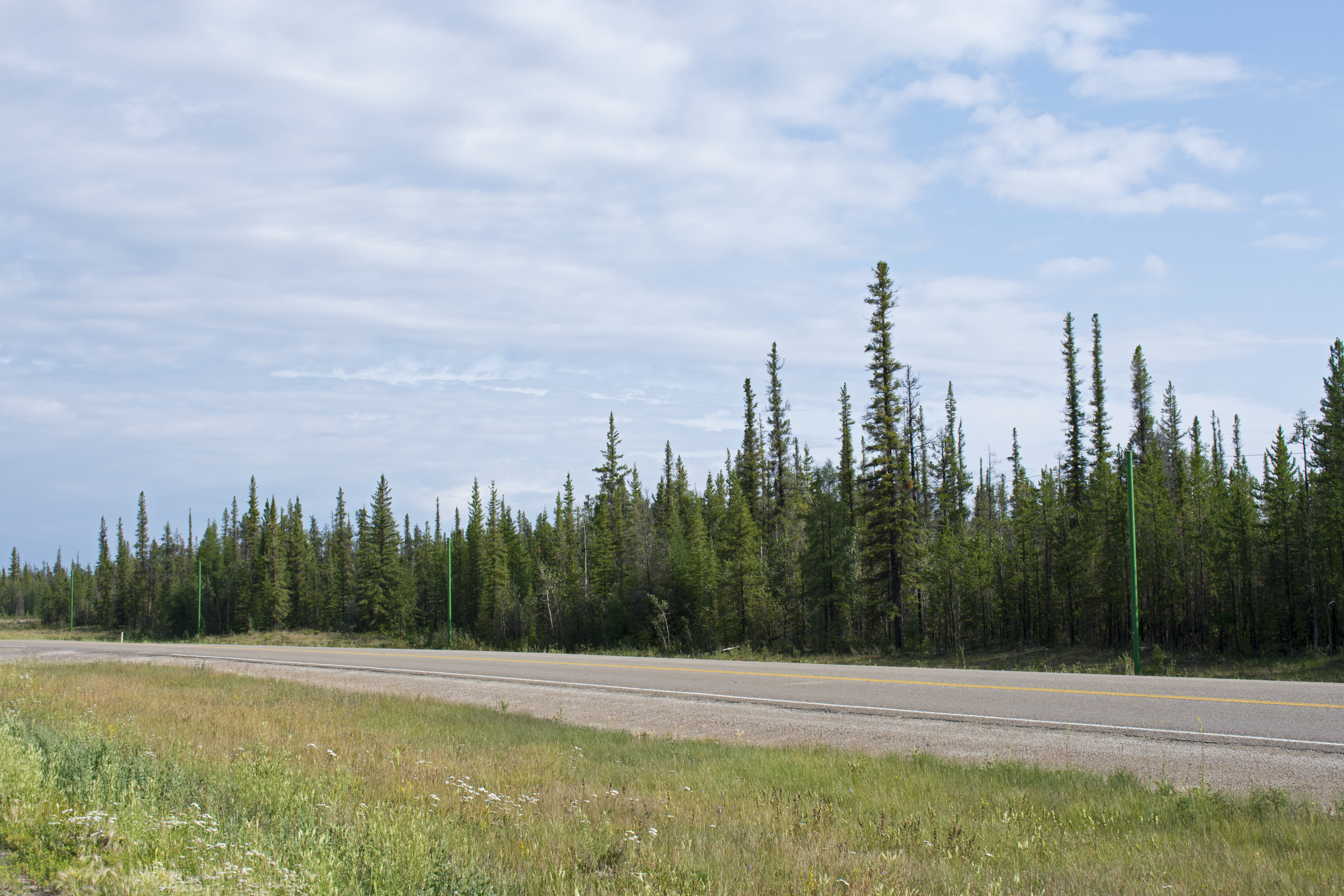
In McNallie Creek Territorial Park
60°46′37.9″N 116°34′25″W

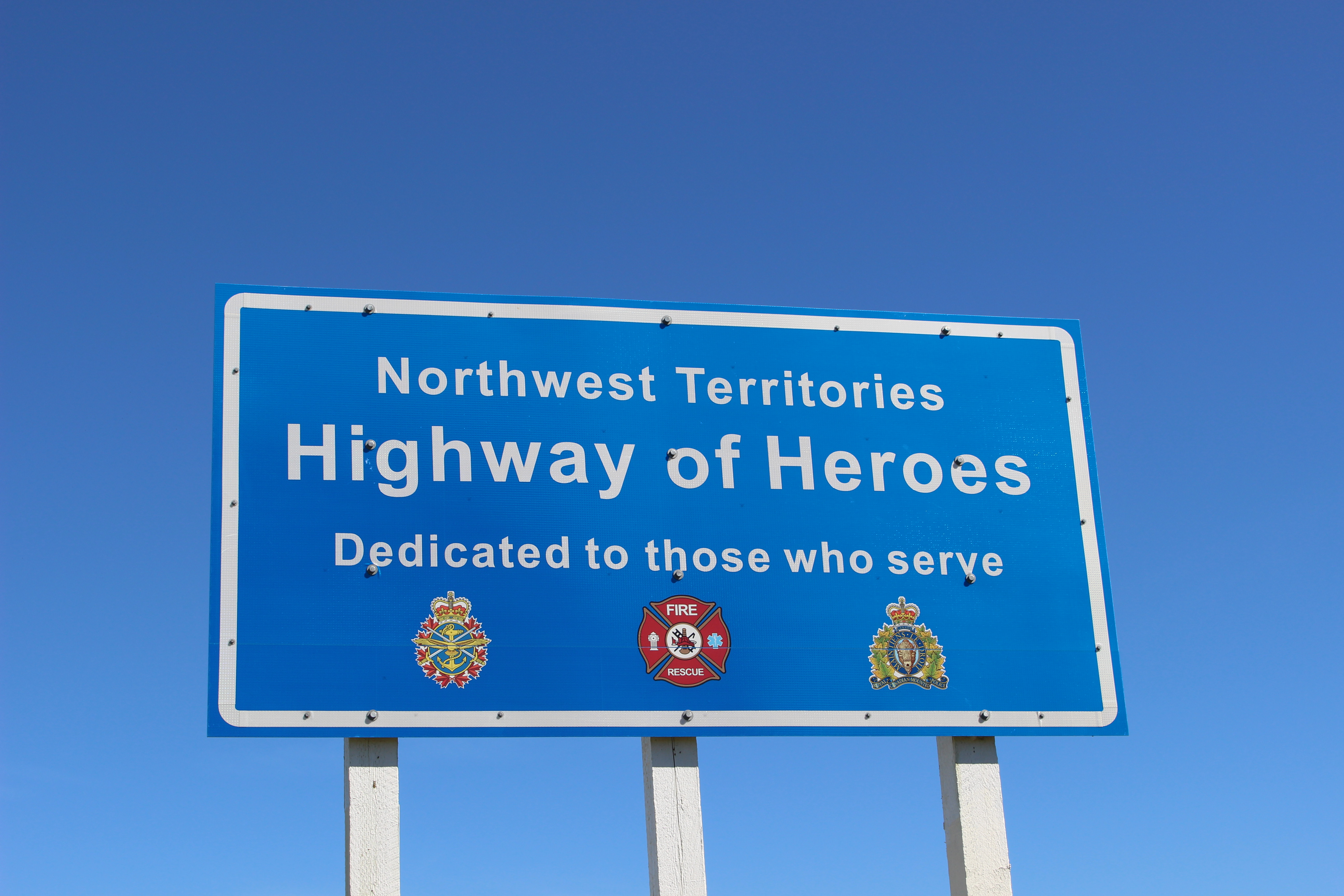
Northwest Territories Highway of Heroes sign
