= Driving in Canada =

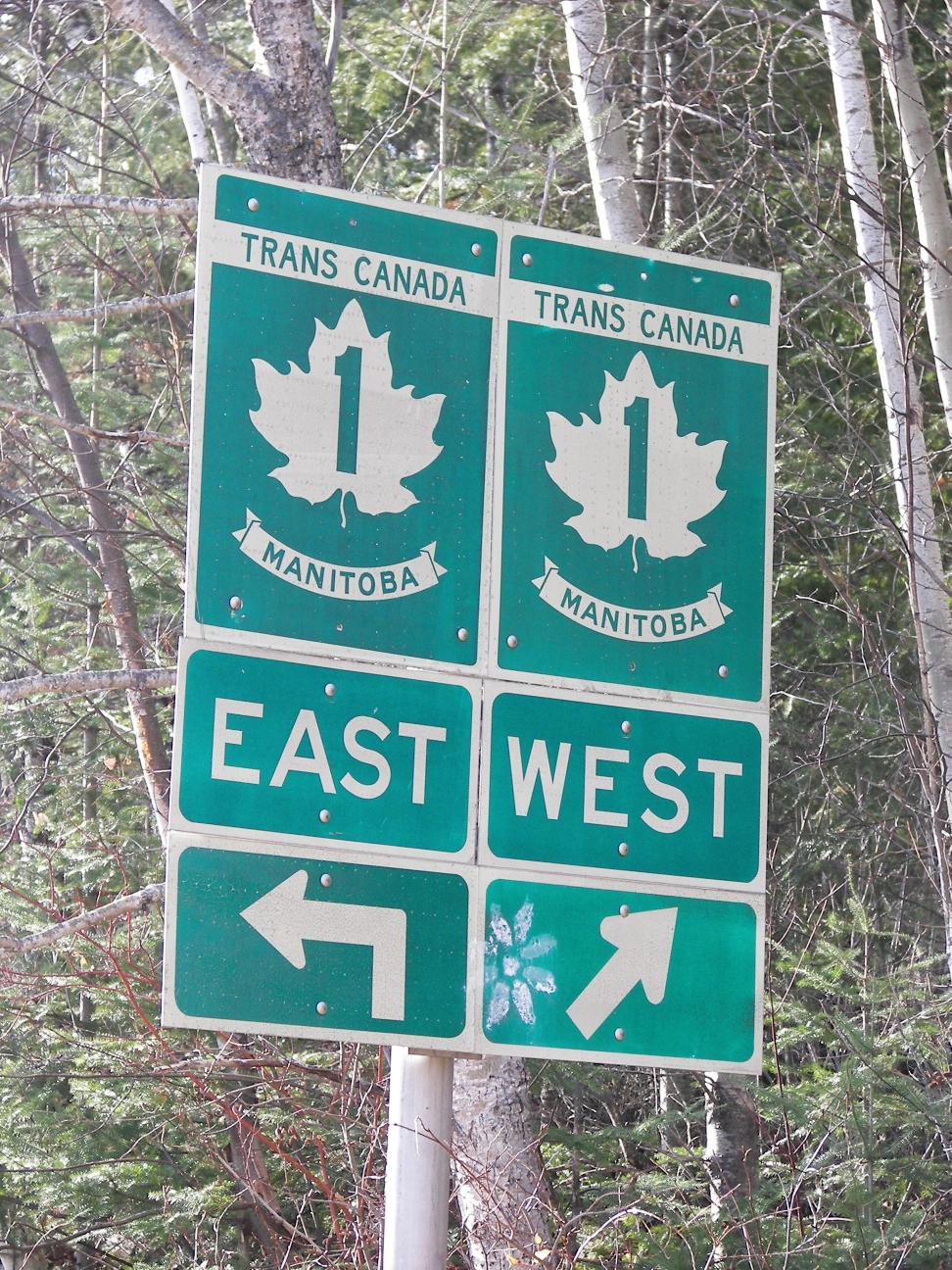
Road signs on the Trans-Canada Highway

As of May 2023, 82.6 percent of people in Canada use private automobiles as their primary form of transportation to their workplace. Canada recorded nearly 26 million registered vehicles in 2020.

== The rules of the road ==
Canadian traffic laws are enforced under federal, provincial/territorial, and municipal jurisdictions. Canada utilizes a right-hand traffic pattern, requiring traffic to keep to the right. Some provinces, however, initially had left-hand traffic patterns, except for Quebec and Ontario which always had right-hand patterns.

Unless there is a sign indicating otherwise, drivers are permitted to turn right on red everywhere in Canada except the Island of Montreal. Generally, drivers at uncontrolled intersections and all-way stops have the right-of-way if they are the first to stop at the intersection, with priority to the right being enforced if multiple vehicles arrive simultaneously.

=== Speed limits ===
Speed limits are set by either the federal, provincial, or municipal governments depending on the jurisdiction under which the road falls. In national parks for example, speed limits are set by Parks Canada, an agency of the federal government. Depending on where you are driving, the speed limit typically ranges from 30 km/h to 100 km/h; highway speed limits usually range from 100 km/h to 110 km/h depending on the province. British Columbia's highways have a speed limit of 120 km/h.

=== Seat belt use ===
Seat belt legislation is determined by province, all of which having passed legislation requiring seat belt use.

== Driver's license ==
A driver's license is legally required to drive a motor vehicle in Canada. These licenses are issued by provincial/territorial governments and must be carried when driving. The process to obtain a driver's license varies by province or territory, but typically contains a written test and a driving test.

== Risk and safety performance ==
In 2020, Transport Canada recorded 104,286 injuries and 1,746 fatalities from vehicle collisions, an average decrease from 2011.

== Insurance ==
In Canada, vehicle insurance is mandatory for all vehicle owners. Insurance structure varies between provinces: most provinces operate within private markets, but three provinces—British Columbia, Saskatchewan, and Manitoba—utilize a mandatory, government-issued minimum coverage. Quebec follows a model in which injury-related claims are covered by the government insurer while property damage is covered by private insurers.
