= Inuvik–Tuktoyaktuk Highway =

Highway in the Northwest Territories, Canada

Inuvik–Tuktoyaktuk Highway
- Northwest Territories Highway 10
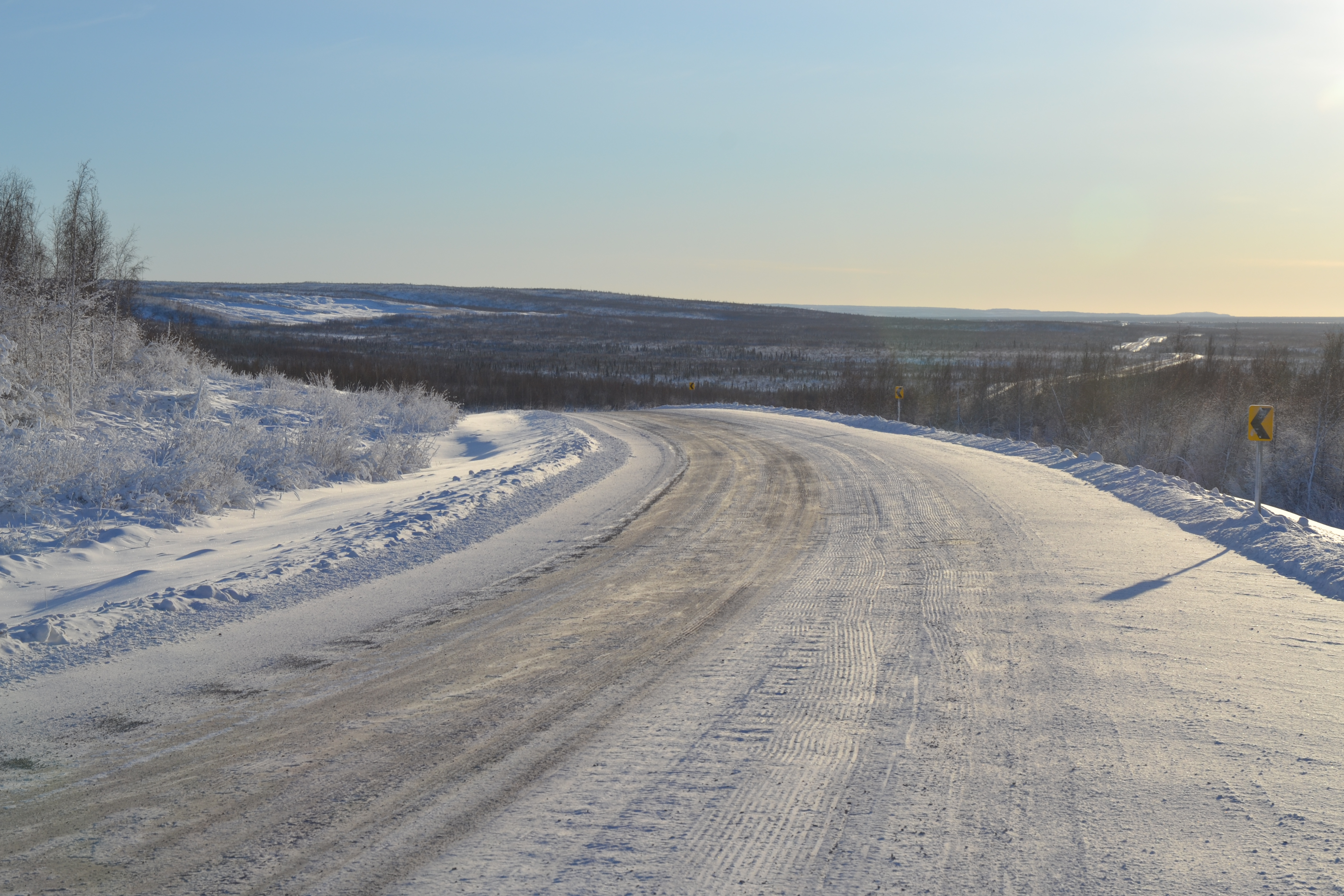

Route information
- Maintained by Department of Transportation
- Length: 138 km (86 mi)

Major junctions
- South end: Highway 8 (Dempster Highway) near Inuvik
- North end: Tuktoyaktuk

Location
- Country: Canada
- Territory: Northwest Territories

Highway system
- Northwest Territories highways
← Highway 9	→ Highway 1

The Inuvik–Tuktoyaktuk Highway (ITH), officially Northwest Territories Highway 10, is an all-weather road between Inuvik and Tuktoyaktuk in the Northwest Territories, Canada. It is the first all-weather road to Canada's Arctic Coast. The idea for the highway had been considered for decades. Final approval came in 2013, and construction began in 2014. It was officially opened on 15 November 2017.

== History and construction ==
Before the construction of the all-weather highway, the Tuktoyaktuk Winter Road, an ice road, connected Inuvik with Tuktoyaktuk during the winter months across the frozen Mackenzie River delta channels and the frozen Arctic Ocean, which was up to 1,000 m (3,300 ft) deep underneath the highway.

The concept of an all-season highway from Inuvik to Tuktoyaktuk was first raised in the 1960s. In 1974, Public Works Canada completed a survey and technical study of a 140 km (87 mi) route between the towns. Upon campaigning during the 2011 election, Prime Minister Stephen Harper announced that it was his intention to complete the 138 km (86 mi) highway extension to Tuktoyaktuk. The 2012 federal budget announced $150 million for the project, and this commitment was increased in March 2013 to $200 million. The highway was seen as both a symbolic effort to link Canada's coastlines by road, and an aid in Arctic sovereignty and access to natural resources. The Inuvialuit completed an environmental review of the project in January 2013 and provided their approval. In March 2013, the territorial legislature approved $65 million for construction of the all-weather highway.

Construction of the highway began in January 2014 and was completed in two directions, with one crew working from the Inuvik side and a second working from the Tuktoyaktuk side. Permafrost presented a challenge for construction of the highway, with the surface melting, leaving much of the construction area under water. The first three years of the project saw crews working 24 hours per day, in the extreme cold and high winds of the arctic winter. By April 2016, the road was fully connected but not open to traffic. The highway opened on 15 November 2017 and includes eight bridges and 359 culverts.

With the completion of the highway, the original Tuktoyaktuk Winter Road was permanently closed at the end of the 2017 winter season.

The ITH project won a National Award for Engineering Project or Achievement in 2019 from Engineers Canada.

== Issues ==
Since the 1980s, there has been a reduction in oil and gas exploration in the region which is serviced by the highway, specifically a 2016 moratorium on drilling in the Canadian Arctic. The primary opportunity the new highway has brought has shifted from resource access to tourism, as it allows tourists to visit Tuktoyaktuk via road instead of plane or boat, which was the only means of access in the summer months. Also of concern is easier access to illegal drugs and alcohol in Tuktoyaktuk, which currently has restrictions on the amount of alcohol residents are allowed to possess. During the summer of 2017, 25 bottles of vodka were seized, which had been smuggled to Tuktoyaktuk via the highway, which was not open at the time.

== Route description ==
The road begins at the end of the Dempster Highway in Inuvik, Northwest Territories, and continues for 138 km (86 mi) north towards Tuktoyaktuk, a coastal community on the Arctic Ocean. The ITH includes eight bridges, and is a two-lane gravel road for its entirety. On 29 April 2017, the Inuvik to Tuktoyaktuk ice road closed for the last time. All vehicle traffic between the two communities is now via the new all-weather road.
