= Yellowknife Highway =

Major road in the Northwest Territories, Canada

Yellowknife Highway
- Northwest Territories Highway 3

Route information
- Maintained by Department of Transportation
- Length: 338.8 km (210.5 mi)

Major junctions
- South end: Highway 1 (Mackenzie Highway) near Fort Providence
- North end: Highway 4 (Ingraham Trail) at Yellowknife

Location
- Country: Canada
- Territory: Northwest Territories

Highway system
- Northwest Territories highways
← Highway 2	→ Highway 4

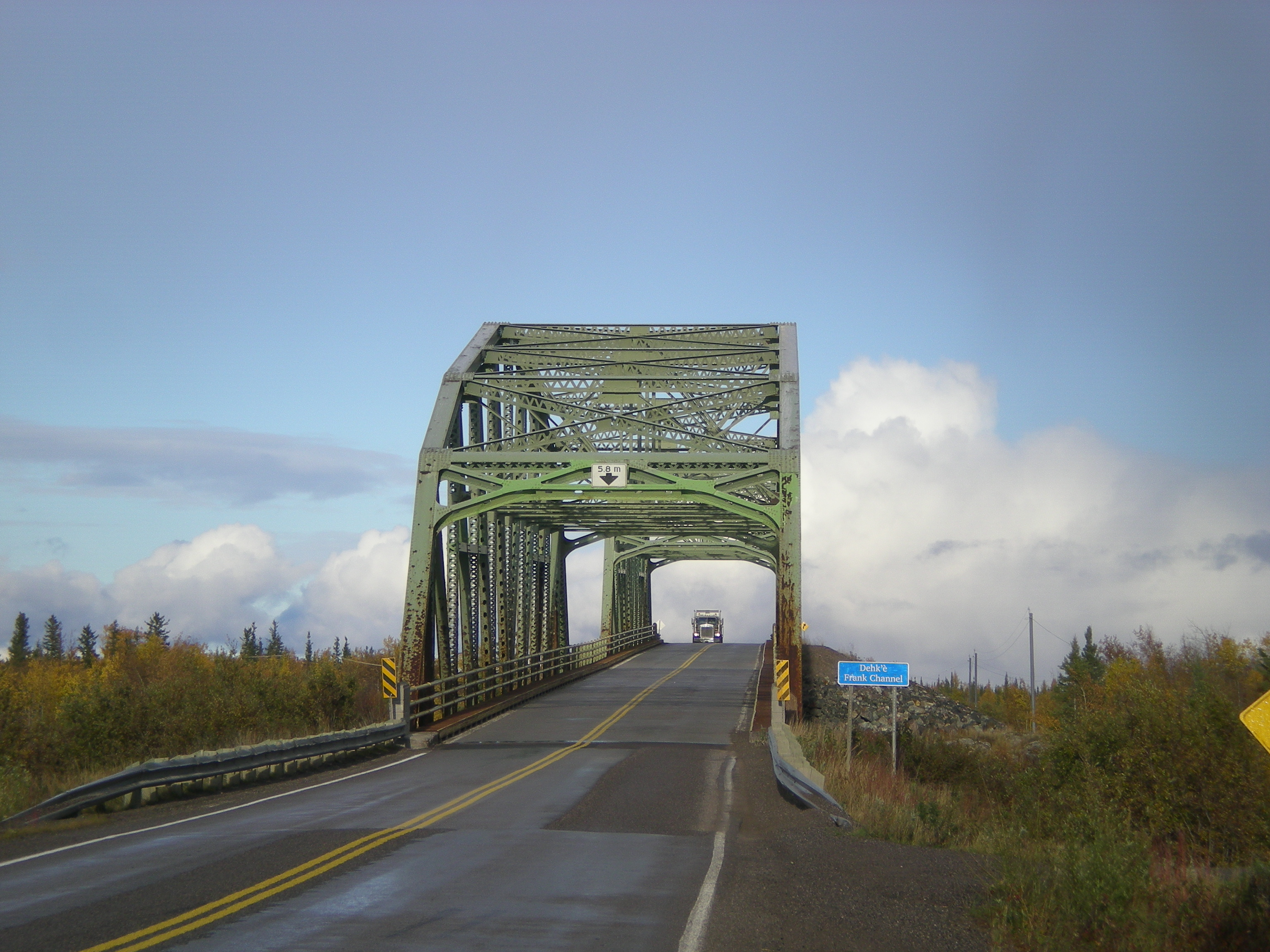
Bridge over the Frank Channel near Behchokǫ̀

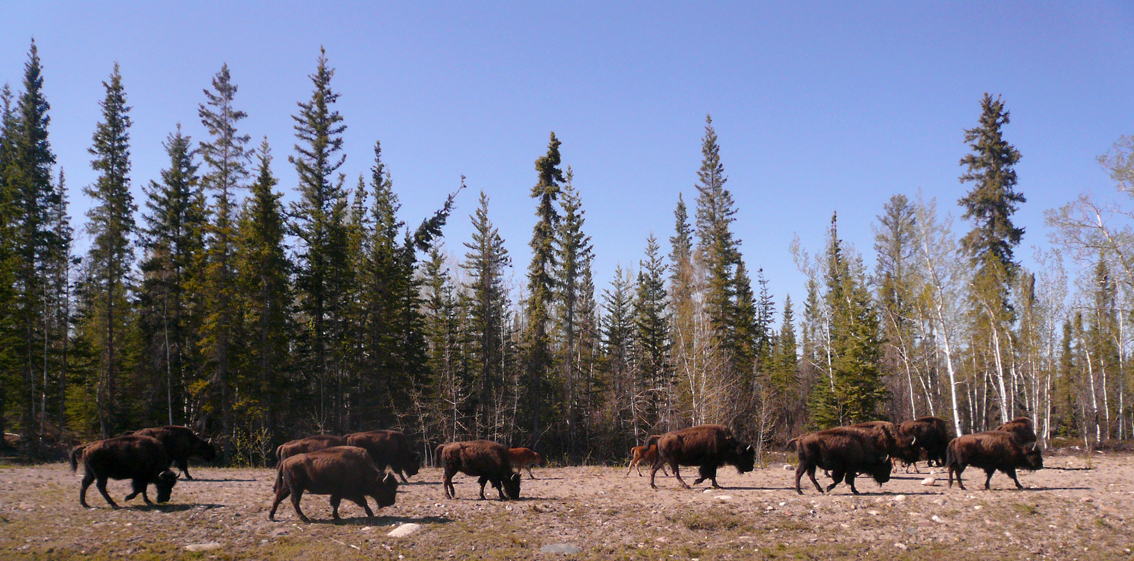
Wood bison along the Yellowknife Highway

The Yellowknife Highway, officially Northwest Territories Highway 3 and also known as the Great Slave Highway, is a highway connecting Yellowknife, Northwest Territories, to the Mackenzie Highway, from a junction 188 kilometres (117 mi) north of the Alberta border. First completed in 1960 as a gravel and dirt road, the highway is now paved and realigned after years of work concluded in 2006. Access to Yellowknife prior to the opening of the Yellowknife Highway was possible only by airplane, winter road, or boat across Great Slave Lake.

The highway also connects with Behchokǫ̀ (formerly Rae-Edzo) and Fort Providence. From Yellowknife, Highway 4 extends a further 70 km (43 mi) east, also providing access to the seasonal winter roads used by commercial trucking for mine resupply.

Crossing the Mackenzie River (just south of Fort Providence) between 1960 and November 2012 required a ferry service (May–January) and ice bridge (December to March). Transportation was interrupted in the spring for approximately five weeks when the ice bridge became unsafe but ice conditions prevented safe ferry operations. The ferry-vessel Johnny Berens served from 1961 to 1972, and the MV Merv Hardie served from 1972 to 2012.

The Deh Cho Bridge opened on November 30, 2012, and replaced the ferry/ice bridge. Trucks pay tolls on northbound crossings, with pre-registered trucks using an electronic device being charged automatically. Private passenger vehicles do not pay a toll. Estimated costs have more than tripled since 2003. The Tłı̨chǫ Highway (Highway 9), running from the Yellowknife Highway near Behchokǫ̀ to Whatì, opened in 2021.

== Major intersections ==
Region	Location	km	mi	Destinations	Notes
South Slave		0	0.0	Highway 1 (Mackenzie Highway) – Enterprise, Hay River, Fort Simpson	Southern terminus
South Slave		23– 25	14– 16	Deh Cho Bridge crosses the Mackenzie River	
South Slave	Fort Providence	32	20	Fort Providence Access Road	
South Slave		197	122	Highway 9 (Tłı̨chǫ Highway) – Whati	
North Slave	Behchokǫ̀	239	149		Formerly Edzo
North Slave	Behchokǫ̀	244	152	Crosses Frank Channel	
North Slave	Behchokǫ̀	245	152	Rae Access Road	
North Slave	Yellowknife	335	208	Yellowknife Airport	
North Slave	Yellowknife	336	209	Highway 4 east (Ingraham Trail) – Dettah, Prelude Lake	
North Slave	Yellowknife	338	210	Old Ingraham Trail / 48 Street – City Centre	Northern terminus
1.000 mi = 1.609 km; 1.000 km = 0.621 mi
