= Tuktoyaktuk Winter Road =

Former ice road in the Northwest Territories, Canada

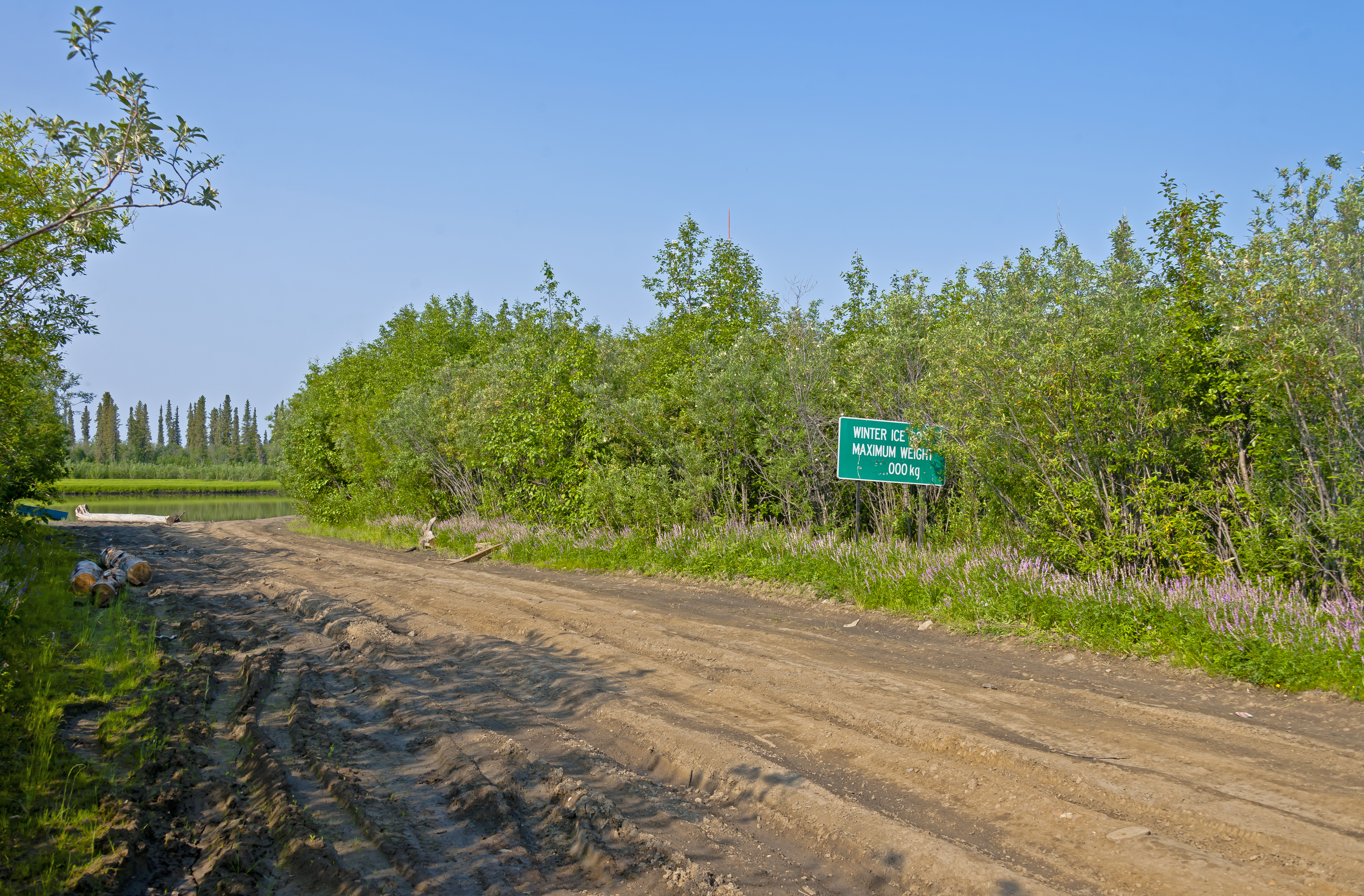
Beginning of the ice portion of the road, seen in summer, south of Inuvik

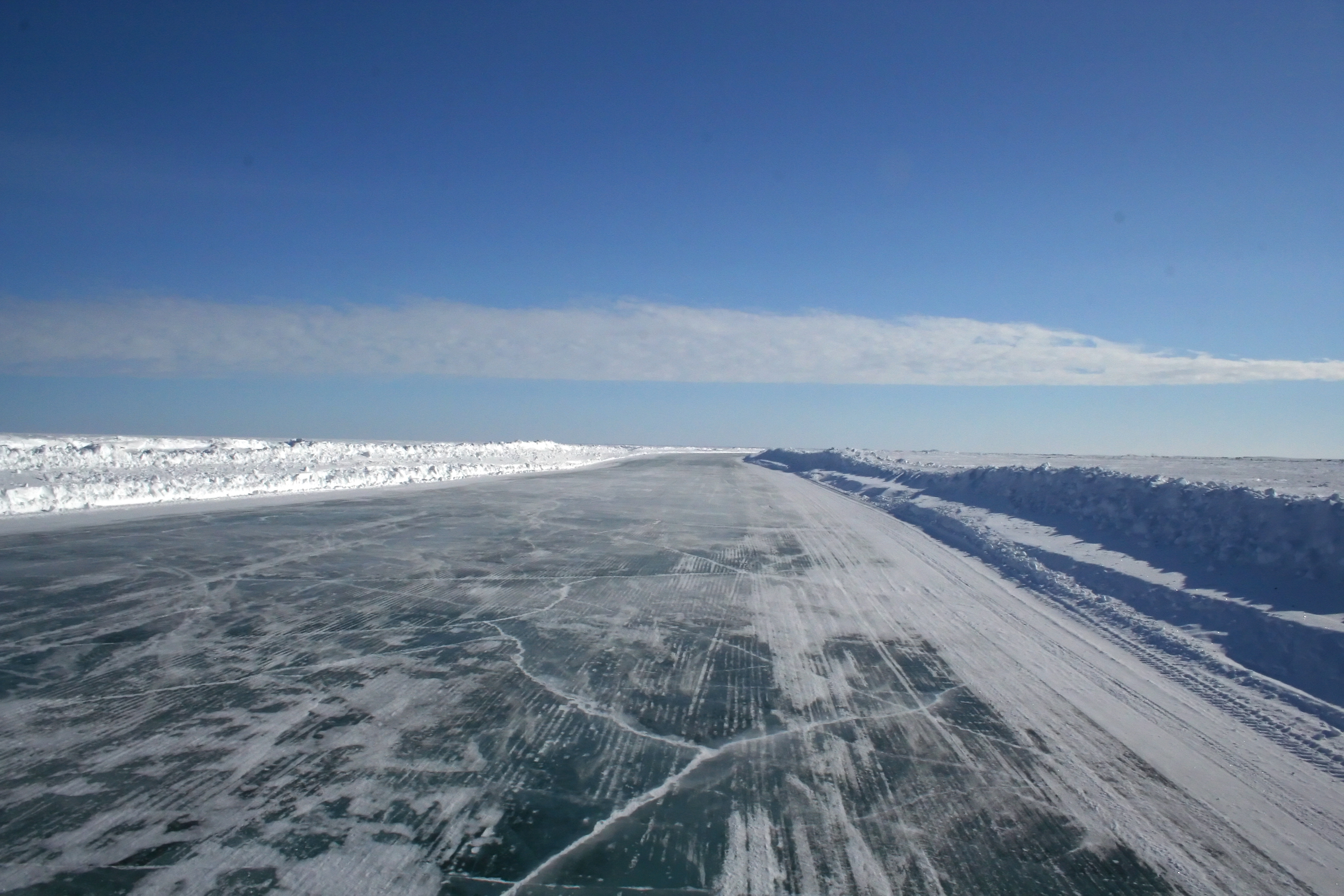

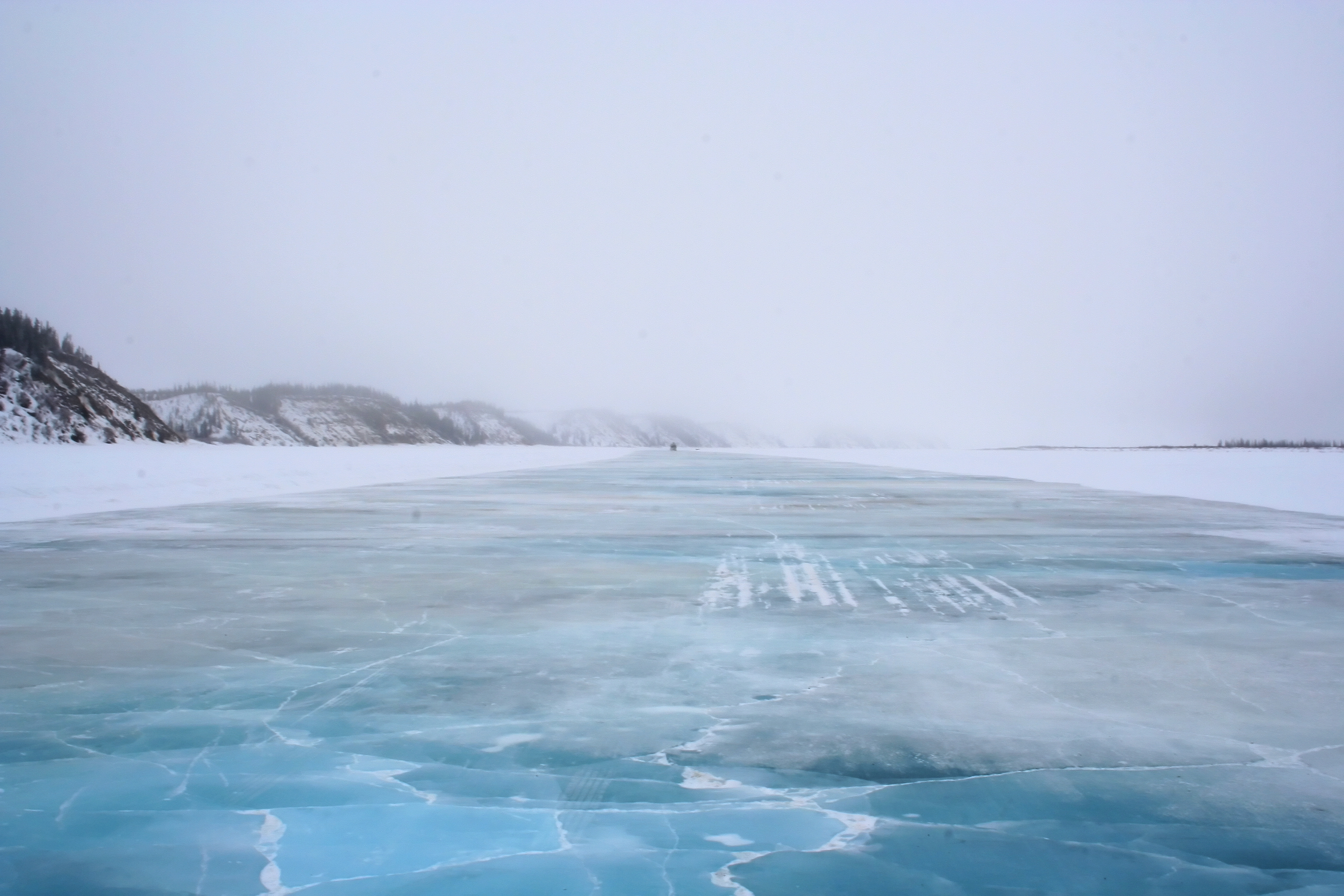

Tuktoyaktuk Winter Road, an extension of the Dempster Highway, was an ice road on frozen Mackenzie River delta channels and the frozen Arctic Ocean between the Northwest Territories communities of Inuvik and Tuktoyaktuk, in Canada. The road closed permanently on 29 April 2017 at the end of the 2016-2017 winter season. Construction of an all-season highway between Inuvik and Tuktoyaktuk commenced in April 2013; it opened on 15 November 2017.

It serviced gas hydrate fields and exploration facilities at Mallik, Aput, and Langley, along with the ice-locked barges Wurmlinger and Arctic Star, which act as bases of operations for ice road crews and exploration personnel. In addition, the road was a key supply line for Tuktoyaktuk and the hamlet of Aklavik.

== Ice Road Truckers ==
A History channel blog announced that the second season of Ice Road Truckers would be based out of Inuvik. A CBC North story reported that the episodes of this season occur on the Tuktoyaktuk Winter Road. Four of the featured drivers from the first season took part: Alex Debogorski, Hugh Rowland, Drew Sherwood, and Rick Yemm.

The road returned in 2012 for the sixth season of the show, with Debogorski the sole featured driver behind the wheel on this winter road. (The entirety of the Dempster Highway, as well as the Dalton Highway in Alaska, and Manitoba's winter roads, were also featured.)
