= Tłı̨chǫ Highway =

Road in Northwest Territories, Canada

Tłı̨chǫ Highway
- Northwest Territories Highway 9

Route information
- Maintained by North Star Infrastructure
- Length: 97 km (60 mi)

Major junctions
- South end: Highway 3 (Yellowknife Highway) near Behchokǫ̀
- North end: Whatì

Location
- Country: Canada
- Territory: Northwest Territories

Highway system
- Northwest Territories highways
← Highway 8	→ Highway 10

The Tłı̨chǫ Highway, also known as the Tłı̨chǫ All-Season Road and officially Northwest Territories Highway 9, is a 97-kilometre (60 mi) gravel road in Northwest Territories, Canada. The road connects the Tłı̨chǫ First Nations community of Whatì to the Yellowknife Highway with a permanent all-season road, while also improving winter road access to Gamètì and Wekweètì.

== Description ==
Construction on the road began in August 2019. The contract to build the highway by 2022 and then maintain it for 25 years was projected to cost $411.8 million. The road opened to traffic on 30 November 2021.
