= Alberta Highway 48 =

Highway in Alberta, Canada

Highway 48

Route information
- Maintained by the Ministry of Transportation and Economic Corridors
- Length: 114 km (71 mi)
- Existed: 1950s–1979

Major junctions
- South end: S-232 at Canada–U.S. border at Wild Horse
- North end: Highway 1 (TCH) near Irvine

Location
- Country: Canada
- Province: Alberta
- Specialized and rural municipalities: Cypress County

Highway system
- Alberta Numbered Highway Network; List; Former
| ← Highway 47 | → Highway 49 |

Alberta Provincial Highway No. 48, commonly referred to as Highway 48, was a north-south highway in southern Alberta, Canada that existed between the 1950s and 1979. It now forms the southernmost portion of Highway 41.

== Route description ==
Highway 48 began appearing on maps in the 1950s and travelled from the Canada–United States border at Wild Horse, through Cypress Hills Provincial Park, to the Trans-Canada Highway (Highway 1), approximately 5 km (3 mi) west of Irvine. Other than the small hamlet of Elkwater within Cypress Hills Provincial Park, Highway 48 did not pass through any communities.

Highway 41 was developed in the 1960s and 1970s northeast of Medicine Hat; and in 1979, Highway 48 was renumbered and became part of Highway 41.
