= Enterprise, Northwest Territories =

Community in the Northwest Territories, Canada

Enterprise
- Hamlet
- Location within Northwest Territories Location within Canada
- Coordinates: 60°33′17″N 116°08′50″W
- Country: Canada
- Territory: Northwest Territories
- Region: South Slave Region
- Constituency: Deh Cho
- Census division: Region 5
- Incorporated (hamlet): 29 October 2007

Government
  - Mayor: Sandra McMaster
  - Senior Administrative Officer: Tammy Neal
  - MLA: Michael Nadli

Area (2021)
  - Land: 305.58 km^{2} (117.99 sq mi)

Population (2021)
  - Total: 75
- Time zone: UTC−06:00 (Northwest Territories Time)
- Canadian Postal code: X0E 0R1 & X0E 1G0
- Area code: 867
- Telephone exchange: 984
- Sources: Department of Municipal and Community Affairs, Prince of Wales Northern Heritage Centre, Canada Flight Supplement

Enterprise is a hamlet in the South Slave Region of the Northwest Territories, Canada, located between Great Slave Lake and the Alberta border on the Hay River.

Enterprise is at an important junction of the Mackenzie Highway and the road to Yellowknife and was established when two service stations were built to take advantage of traffic along these highways. It has since grown to include a weigh station, restaurant, and a motel to accommodate travellers. Most of the remaining commercial region, however, is currently closed.

It is a significant point on the Northwest Territories highway system, as all traffic that heads to the two largest population centres, Yellowknife to the north, and the nearby town of Hay River to the northeast, must pass through. As such, a tourism centre/visitors centre is located right in the heart of town, where the old weigh station used to be.

In August 2023, most buildings in Enterprise were destroyed by wildfires.

== History ==
With the completion of the Mackenzie Highway in 1948 from Grimshaw, Alberta, to Hay River on the shores of Great Slave Lake, a number of new service stops were built along its length. In the winter of 1948/1949, Jack Parnall, a freight operator based in Hay River, opened a service station at the junction of the Mackenzie Highway and the Mills Lake winter road, which connected to the Mills Lake freight staging area on the Mackenzie River below Fort Providence. In the late 1950s, the highway was extended to Yellowknife on the north side of Great Slave Lake, and Enterprise became the important junction. Jerry and Mae Eyford opened a Pacific 66 garage in 1956 and Sammy Petersen built a motel and general store in 1964. The community is a service centre for travellers and is also the base of operations for GNWT highway maintenance in this region.

== Demographics ==
Federal census population history of Enterprise
Year	Pop.	±%
1976	83	—
1981	46	−44.6%
1986	56	+21.7%
1991	49	−12.5%
1996	86	+75.5%
2001	67	−22.1%
2006	97	+44.8%
2011	99	+2.1%
2016	106	+7.1%
2021	75	−29.2%
Source: Statistics Canada

Annual population estimates

Year	Pop.	±%
1996	87	—
1997	82	−5.7%
1998	74	−9.8%
1999	80	+8.1%
2000	75	−6.2%
2001	68	−9.3%
2002	74	+8.8%
2003	73	−1.4%
2004	94	+28.8%
2005	97	+3.2%
2006	99	+2.1%
2007	102	+3.0%
2008	104	+2.0%

Year	Pop.	±%
2009	107	+2.9%
2010	103	−3.7%
2011	103	+0.0%
2012	115	+11.7%
2013	120	+4.3%
2014	123	+2.5%
2015	116	−5.7%
2016	120	+3.4%
2017	125	+4.2%
2018	119	−4.8%
2019	116	−2.5%
2020	120	+3.4%
2021	120	+0.0%

Sources: NWT Bureau of Statistics (2001 - 2017), NWT Bureau of Statistics (2018 - 2021)

In the 2021 Canadian census conducted by Statistics Canada, Enterprise had a population of 75 living in 33 of its 51 total private dwellings, a change of −29.2% from its 2016 population of 106. With a land area of 305.58 km^{2} (117.99 sq mi), it had a population density of 0.2/km^{2} (0.6/sq mi) in 2021.

At the 2016 Canadian census there were 30 First Nations, 10 Métis and 10 Inuit. The main languages, besides English, are North and South Slavey, Inuinnaqtun (Inuvialuktun) and German.

== Incorporation ==
In 2007, Enterprise filed a petition to change from settlement status to hamlet, which would allow for greater powers by council, a public voting for mayor, and freedom to set property tax rates. On 27 October 2007 the community was officially incorporated and Allan Flamand became the first mayor.

== Climate ==
Enterprise has a subarctic climate (Dfc) with the yearly mean temperature being below zero in spite of the relatively warm summers around 22 °C (72 °F) resulting in Enterprise being well below the tree line in the boreal forest. Winter average highs are around −20 °C (−4 °F) with lows being −31 °C (−24 °F), typical of the boreal forests north of the prairies.

Climate data for Hay River (Hay River/Merlyn Carter Airport) WMO ID: 71935; coordinates 60°50′23″N 115°46′58″W; elevation: 164.9 m (541 ft); 1991–2020 normals, extremes 1893–present (Note: Climate data was recorded at Hay River from September 1893 to June 1943 and at Hay River Airport from April 1943 to present.)
Month	Jan	Feb	Mar	Apr	May	Jun	Jul	Aug	Sep	Oct	Nov	Dec	Year
Record high humidex	10.6	12.9	17.3	25.8	31.1	35.1	44.6	39.8	32.2	25.4	12.8	11.2	44.6
Record high °C (°F)	10.7 (51.3)	13.9 (57.0)	17.6 (63.7)	26.0 (78.8)	33.3 (91.9)	34.0 (93.2)	35.6 (96.1)	36.7 (98.1)	31.7 (89.1)	25.6 (78.1)	15.0 (59.0)	14.4 (57.9)	36.7 (98.1)
Mean daily maximum °C (°F)	−16.9 (1.6)	−13.7 (7.3)	−7.7 (18.1)	2.4 (36.3)	11.4 (52.5)	18.4 (65.1)	21.7 (71.1)	19.9 (67.8)	13.8 (56.8)	4.3 (39.7)	−7.0 (19.4)	−14.2 (6.4)	2.7 (36.9)
Daily mean °C (°F)	−21.4 (−6.5)	−19.1 (−2.4)	−13.7 (7.3)	−3.1 (26.4)	5.9 (42.6)	12.9 (55.2)	16.6 (61.9)	14.9 (58.8)	9.2 (48.6)	0.8 (33.4)	−10.7 (12.7)	−18.4 (−1.1)	−2.2 (28.0)
Mean daily minimum °C (°F)	−25.8 (−14.4)	−24.3 (−11.7)	−19.6 (−3.3)	−8.6 (16.5)	0.3 (32.5)	7.4 (45.3)	11.5 (52.7)	9.8 (49.6)	4.5 (40.1)	−2.7 (27.1)	−14.4 (6.1)	−22.6 (−8.7)	−7.0 (19.4)
Record low °C (°F)	−52.2 (−62.0)	−50.6 (−59.1)	−47.2 (−53.0)	−40.0 (−40.0)	−24.4 (−11.9)	−6.1 (21.0)	−1.7 (28.9)	−6.7 (19.9)	−15.6 (3.9)	−26.1 (−15.0)	−40.8 (−41.4)	−51.2 (−60.2)	−52.2 (−62.0)
Record low wind chill	−58.7	−60.4	−54.9	−47.7	−26.6	−7.4	0.0	0.0	−17.1	−34.3	−54.4	−55.8	−60.4
Average precipitation mm (inches)	16.6 (0.65)	13.9 (0.55)	15.3 (0.60)	11.1 (0.44)	20.8 (0.82)	25.4 (1.00)	41.9 (1.65)	59.7 (2.35)	42.3 (1.67)	33.0 (1.30)	24.0 (0.94)	16.4 (0.65)	320.3 (12.61)
Average rainfall mm (inches)	0.3 (0.01)	0.2 (0.01)	0.3 (0.01)	3.9 (0.15)	16.2 (0.64)	25.1 (0.99)	43.8 (1.72)	60.2 (2.37)	42.9 (1.69)	15.9 (0.63)	0.8 (0.03)	0.3 (0.01)	209.9 (8.26)
Average snowfall cm (inches)	22.2 (8.7)	16.6 (6.5)	16.8 (6.6)	8.9 (3.5)	4.3 (1.7)	0.0 (0.0)	0.0 (0.0)	0.0 (0.0)	1.1 (0.4)	19.1 (7.5)	34.4 (13.5)	22.1 (8.7)	145.5 (57.3)
Average precipitation days (≥ 0.2 mm)	11.7	10.8	9.7	5.3	6.9	8.4	9.8	11.2	11.7	12.4	13.2	11.8	123.0
Average rainy days (≥ 0.2 mm)	0.2	0.1	0.3	2.0	5.5	8.3	9.7	11.1	11.9	6.6	1.0	0.5	57.2
Average snowy days (≥ 0.2 cm)	12.2	9.6	8.5	3.3	1.7	0.0	0.0	0.0	0.7	6.9	13.8	12.5	69.1
Average relative humidity (%) (at 1500 LST)	70.5	67.3	60.8	59.2	53.6	54.1	56.9	59.3	61.2	70.6	79.2	74.8	64.0
Source: Environment and Climate Change Canada (January minimum) (February minimum) (March minimum) (April minimum) (May minimum) (June minimum) (July minimum / maximum) (August minimum) (September minimum / maximum) (October minimum / maximum) (December minimum / maximum)

- Hay River is approximately 40 km (25 mi) away

== See also ==
- List of municipalities in the Northwest Territories
