= List of airlines of the Northwest Territories =

This is a list of airlines of the Northwest Territories which have an air operator's certificate issued by Transport Canada, the country's civil aviation authority. These are airlines that are based in the Northwest Territories.

== Current airlines ==
Airline	Image	IATA	ICAO	Callsign	Hub airport(s)	Notes
Air Tindi		8T			Yellowknife, Fort Simpson	Scheduled passenger service, charters. Owned by Discovery Air.
Aklak Air		6L	AKK	AKLAK	Inuvik (Mike Zubko)	Scheduled passenger service, charters. Part of the Inuvialuit Development Corporation.
Buffalo Airways		J4	BFL	BUFFALO	Hay River	Scheduled passenger service, charters, cargo, aerial firefighting. featured on Ice Pilots NWT.
Canadian North		5T	MPE	EMPRESS	Yellowknife	Scheduled passenger service, charter airline
Northwestern Air		J3	PLR	POLARIS	Fort Smith	Scheduled passenger service, charters, cargo
North-Wright Airways		HW	NWL	NORTHWRIGHT	Norman Wells	Scheduled passenger service, charters
Summit Air					Yellowknife	Charters

== Defunct airlines ==
Airline	Image	IATA	ICAO	Callsign	Hub airport(s)	Notes
Arctic Sunwest Charters				ARCTIC SUNWEST	Yellowknife	1989 – 2013; Bought by the Ledcor Group of Companies and re-branded as Summit Air
Latham Island Airways					Yellowknife Water	1988 – 1991; To Air Tindi
NWT Air					Yellowknife	1960 – 1997; To First Air
Trinity Helicopters					Yellowknife	? – 2013; Bought by the Ledcor Group of Companies and rebranded as Summit Helicopters

== Other ==
Airline	Image	IATA	ICAO	Callsign	Hub airport(s)	Notes
First Air		7F	FAB	FIRST AIR	Yellowknife, Iqaluit	Scheduled passenger service, cargo, charters Headquarters in Ontario, major airline in the Northwest Territories and Nunavut.
