= Air Tindi Flight 200 =

2011 aviation accident in Canada

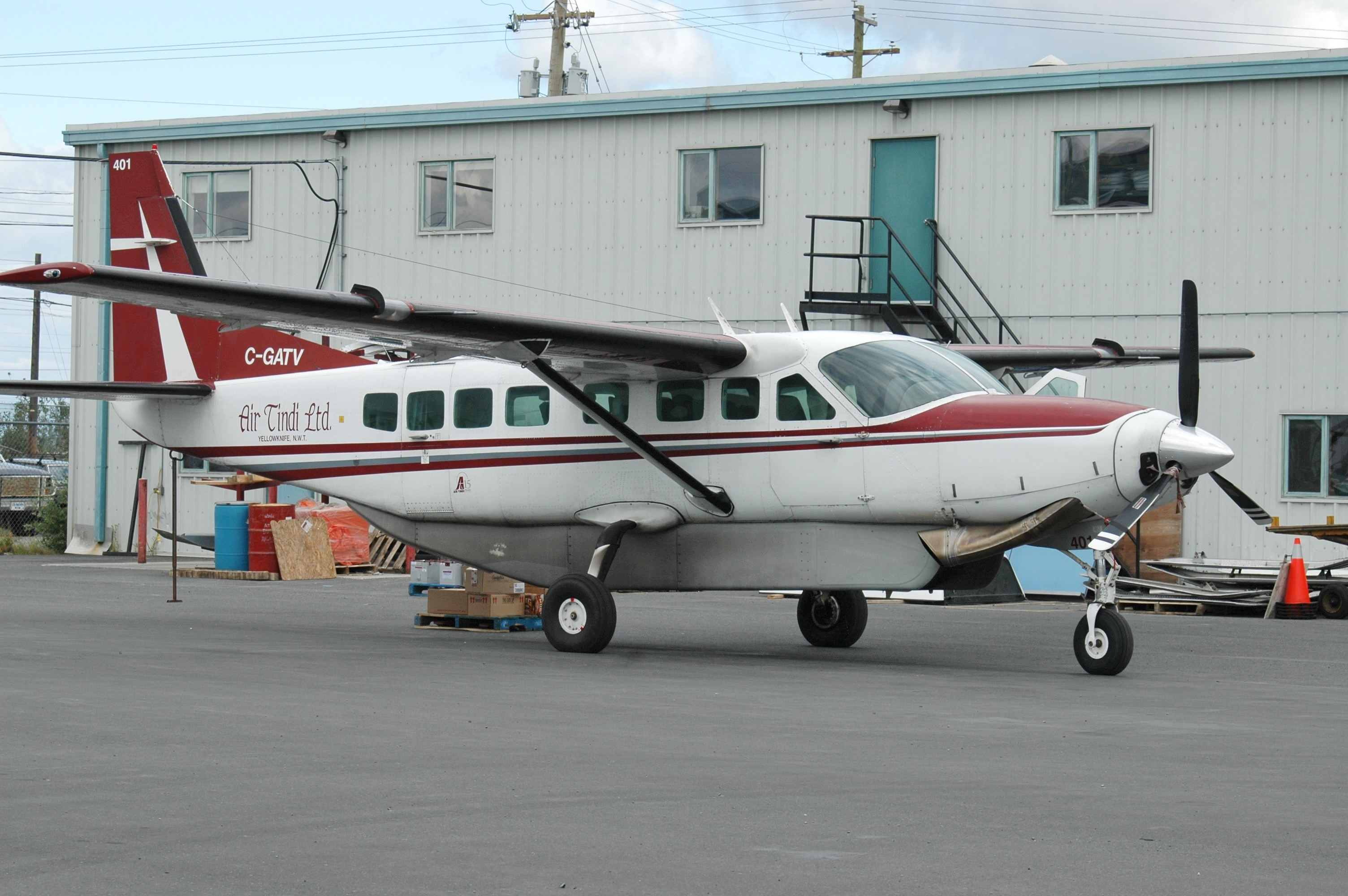
- C-GATV, the aircraft involved in the accident, pictured in 2008

Accident
- Date: October 4, 2011
- Summary: Controlled flight into terrain caused by pilot high on cannabis and low visibility
- Site: Łutselk'e, North Slave Region, Northwest Territories, Canada

Aircraft
- Aircraft type: Cessna 208B Grand Caravan
- Operator: Air Tindi
- IATA flight No.: 8T200
- ICAO flight No.: TIN200
- Call sign: TINDI200
- Registration: C-GATV
- Flight origin: Yellowknife Airport, Yellowknife, Northwest Territories, Canada
- Destination: Lutselk'e Airport, Łutselk'e, Northwest Territories, Canada
- Occupants: 4
- Passengers: 3
- Crew: 1
- Fatalities: 2
- Injuries: 2
- Survivors: 2

On October 4, 2011, a Cessna 208B Grand Caravan operating as Air Tindi Flight 200 crashed while on a passenger flight west of Lutselk'e Airport in Łutselk'e, Northwest Territories, killing the pilot and a passenger, as well as seriously injuring two others.

== Background ==
=== Aircraft ===
The aircraft involved was a Cessna 208B Grand Caravan manufactured in 1992 and operated by Air Tindi with the registration C-GATH. The aircraft could carry seven passengers and cargo. It was maintained in accordance with existing regulations and approved procedures and was equipped for IFR operations and included a GPS receiver with no terrain awareness features.

=== Passengers and crew ===
The flight was piloted by 28-year-old Matthew Bromley. Bromley received a commercial pilot license for aeroplanes in 2004. He worked as a ramp attendant until 2007, when he began flying as a co-pilot on a de Havilland Canada DHC-6 Twin Otter, logging approximately 1,500 hours. In 2010, he began being the co-pilot on the Beechcraft King Air, logging 450 hours, until February 2011 when he started training on the Cessna 208. He completed a VFR pilot proficiency check ride in March of the same year, followed by company line indoctrination on type. He failed his first IFR check-ride, but passed a second on August 18. There was no co-pilot. Three passengers were also on board the flight.

== Crash ==
The aircraft departed Yellowknife Airport at 11:03 on a passenger flight to Lutselk'e Airport. The aircraft was expected to arrive at 11:45. When it did not arrive, a search and rescue operation was launched. The emergency locator transmitter was not used but was functional. It was flying at low level so he could maintain visual contact with the ground. The aircraft crashed at high speed into the top of a hill while being controlled by the pilot 26 nautical miles west of the airport. The impact caused the plane to crash inverted and one of the wings to slice through the cabin, making the crash worst. Pieces of debris were scattered 600 feet from the crash site. The pilot and 54-year-old passenger Tim Harris were killed while two other passengers, identified as Bernice Marlowe and Sheldon Catholique, survived and were transported by a de Havilland Canada DHC-6 Twin Otter medevac flight to the Stanton Territorial Hospital in Yellowknife with serious injuries. The bodies of the deceased were sent to Edmonton for post-mortems.

== Aftermath ==
Air Tindi instituted random drug tests for all employees in safety-sensitive jobs after the crash and expressed condolences to the people affected.

== Investigation ==
The Transportation Safety Board of Canada recovered engine and flight instruments from the crash site and sent them to labs in Ottawa, Ontario. They made an animation of the crash as well. The preliminary report was released a year later. The crash was caused by the pilot flying at low altitude during low visibility, causing him to be unable to avoid terrain, and that a toxicology report revealed that the pilot was high on cannabinoids, causing impairment in performance and decision-making. The weather on the day of the crash was rainy and overcast with poor visibility.

== See also ==
- 2011 Missinippi Airways Cessna 208 crash: another Cessna 208 crash in the same year
- Wasaya Airways Flight 125: another Cessna 208 crash in Canada eight years prior
