= Air Tindi =

Airline in Yellowknife, NWT, Canada

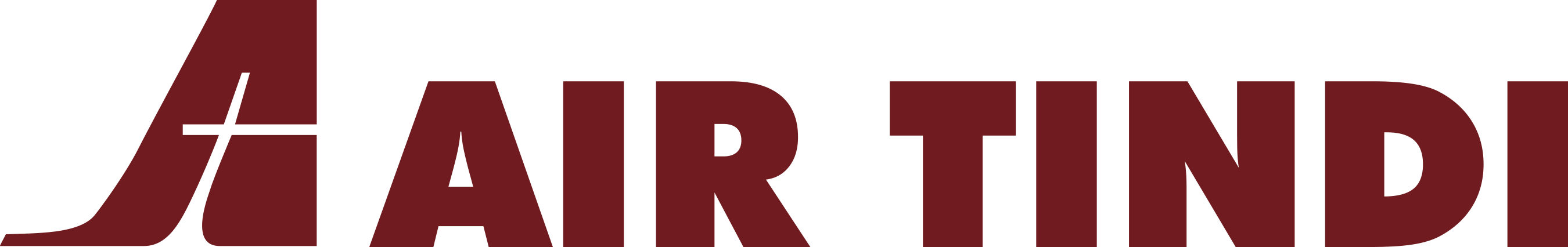

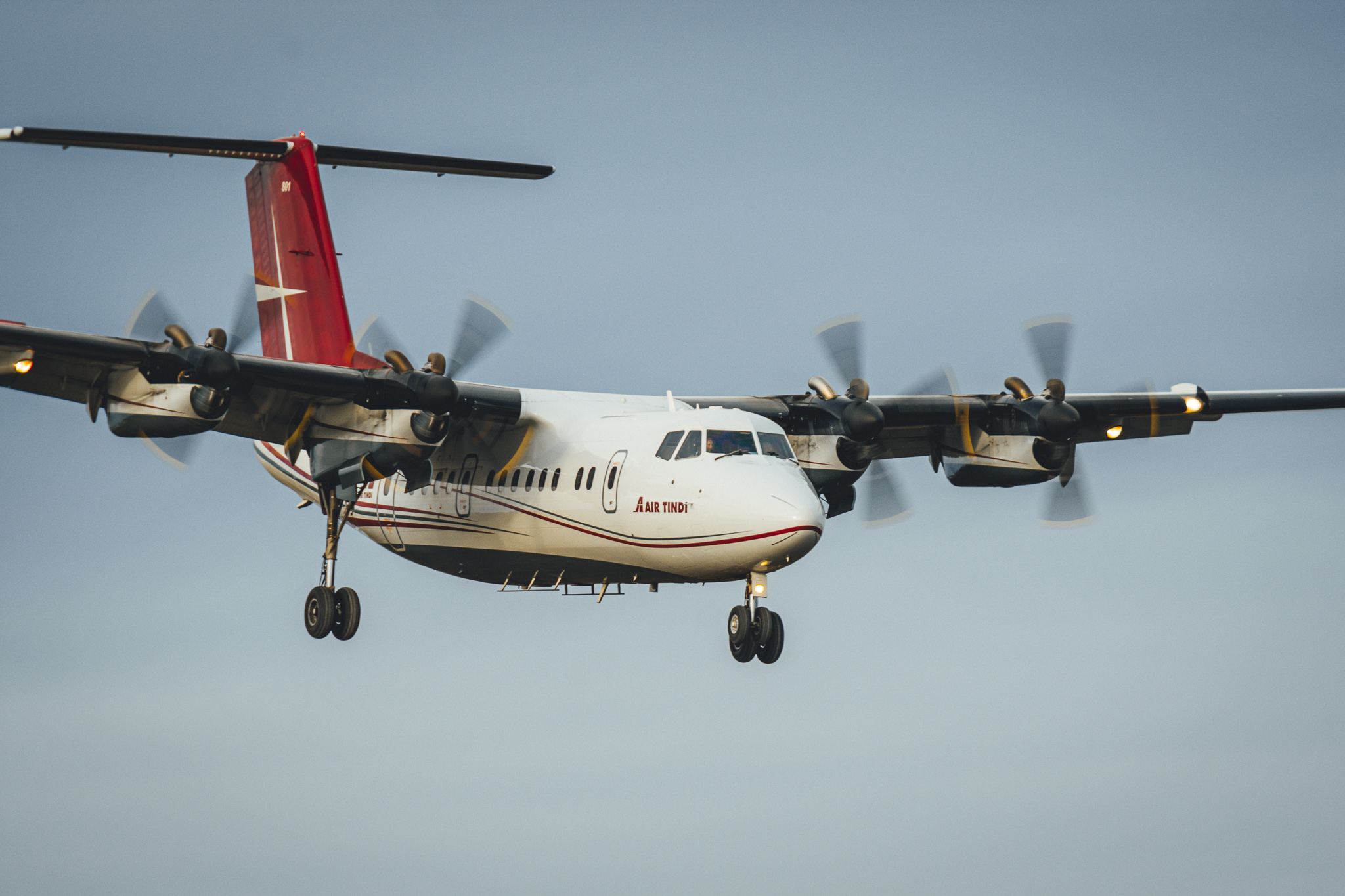
- Air Tindi DHC-7 Dash 7
IATA	ICAO	Call sign
8T	TIN	TINDI
- Founded: 1988
- AOC #: 3169
- Hubs: Yellowknife Airport; Fort Simpson Airport
- Fleet size: 26 (TC), 19 (AT)
- Destinations: 9
- Headquarters: Yellowknife, Northwest Territories
- Key people: Chris Reynolds (president)
- Employees: approx. 250
- Website: http://www.airtindi.com

Air Tindi is an airline based in Yellowknife, Northwest Territories, Canada. It operates scheduled and on demand charter services. Its main base is Yellowknife Airport and the airline was previously owned by the Arychuk family. The name Tindi means "the big lake" or "Great Slave Lake" in the local native Tłı̨chǫ Yatiì language.

== History ==
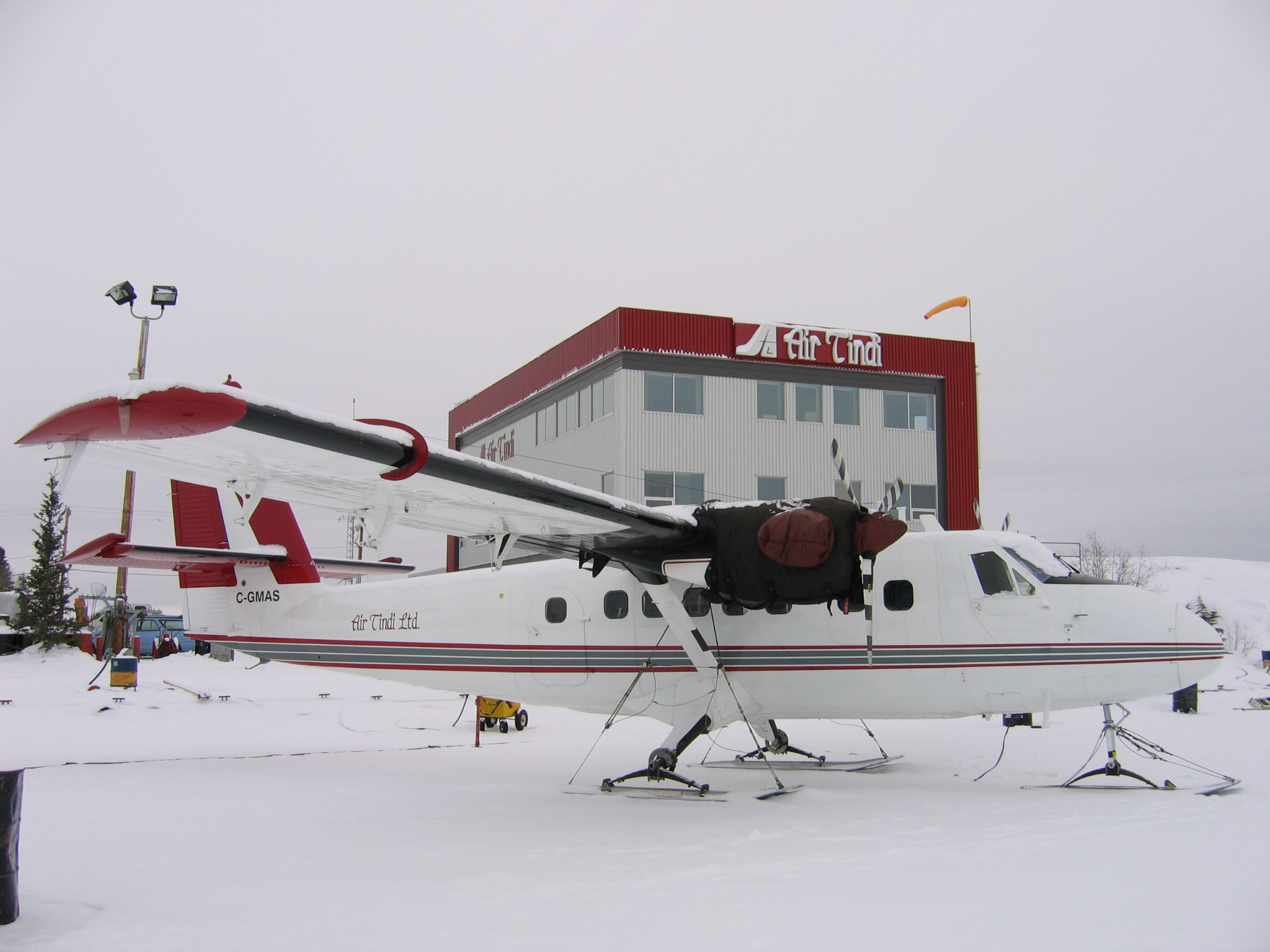
Air Tindi DHC-6 Twin Otter operating in winter

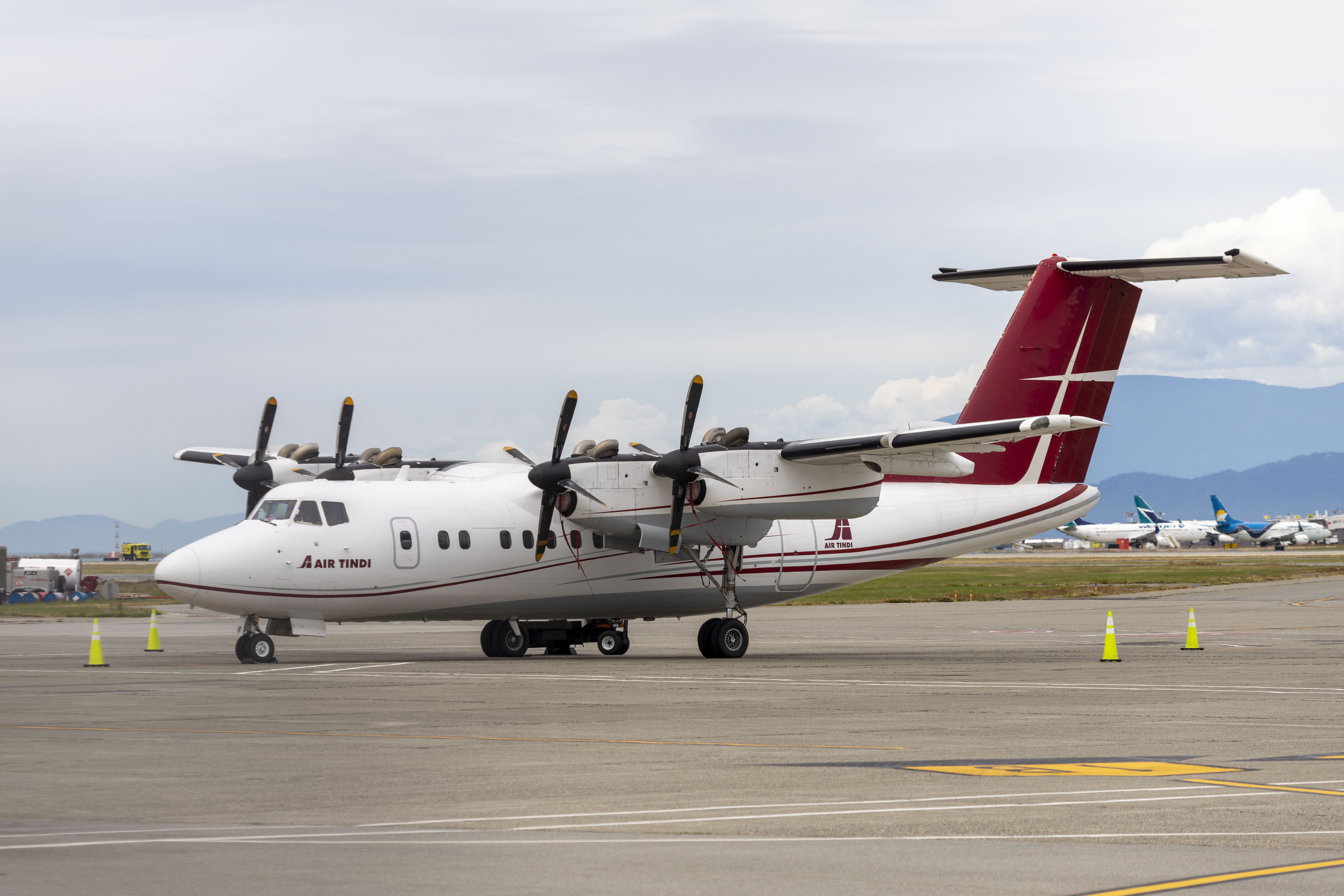
Air Tindi DHC-7 Dash 7 at Vancouver International Airport

Air Tindi was established by two families, Alex Arychuk and his wife Sheila, and his brother Peter Arychuk and his wife Teri. It began operations on 1 November 1988, with four float / ski aircraft. In 1990, it purchased its first turboprop, the STOL capable de Havilland Canada DHC-6 Twin Otter with the help of the Rae-Edzo Development Corporation, allowing the airline to expand and provide more services to the growing mining exploration industry. In 1991, Air Tindi merged with Latham Island Airways and acquired a further four aircraft in the process. By mid-1992, Air Tindi was operating four Twin Otters on floats. In 1993, its first large aircraft was purchased, a DHC-4 Caribou for re-supply work with the mining industry. A DHC-7 Dash 7 STOL capable turboprop was acquired in 1996.

On 19 December 2006, Air Tindi was sold to Discovery Air (Toronto Stock Exchange at DA.A), a publicly traded holding company based in London, Ontario. The founders originally maintained their positions with Air Tindi, but various corporate disagreements led to Alex Arychuk leaving as president, and departing the Discovery Air board.

In August 2011, the Government of Nunavut announced that it had awarded a contract to Air Tindi and its partner Aqsaqniq, owned by Dennis Lyall, to provide medivac services to the Kitikmeot Region of Nunavut. The previous holder of the contract, Adlair Aviation, appealed to the Nunavummi Nangminiqaqtunik Ikajuuti and a decision was expected by 11 October 2011. The decision to dismiss the appeal was made 29 October 2011 and the news released 31 October. Adlair was given an extension on their contract until the end of November 2011. Air Tindi also provides medivac services for the entirety of Northwest Territories.

In December 2024, Northwestern Air announced it would be shutting down its scheduled flights. Air Tindi agreed to take over its routes and announced it would acquire two Dash 8s to cover the Yellowknife-Fort Smith-Fort Chipewyan-Edmonton route.

== Destinations ==
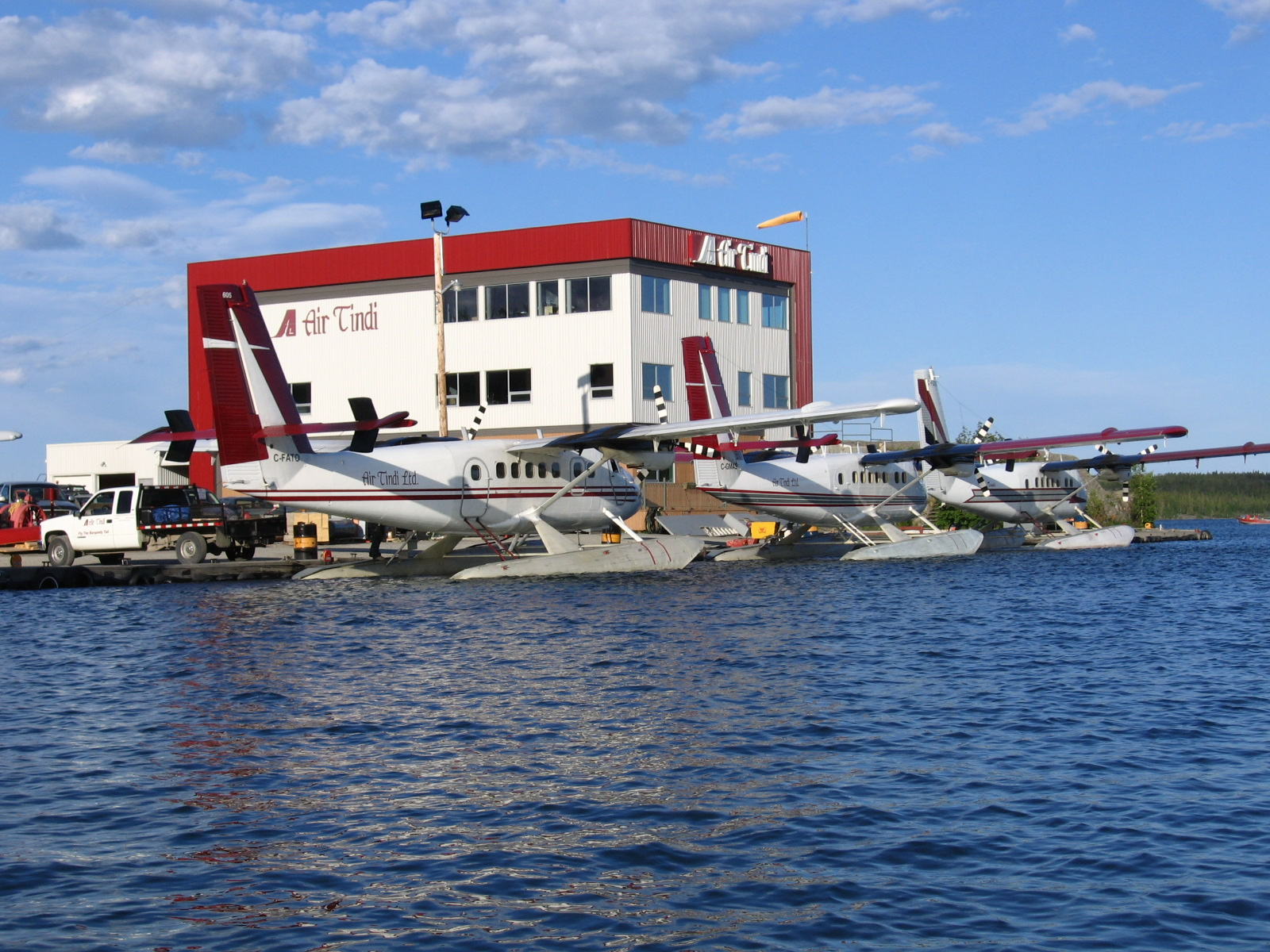
View of three Air Tindi DHC-6 Twin Otter floatplanes in Yellowknife

As of 5 November 2025 Air Tindi operates services to the following domestic scheduled destinations:

Province/territory	City	Airport	Notes
Alberta	Edmonton	Edmonton International Airport	Southern gateway
Alberta	Fort Chipewyan	Fort Chipewyan Airport	
Northwest Territories	Fort Simpson	Fort Simpson Airport	
Northwest Territories	Fort Smith	Fort Smith Airport	
Northwest Territories	Gamèti	Gamètì/Rae Lakes Airport	
Northwest Territories	Hay River	Hay River/Merlyn Carter Airport	
Northwest Territories	Whatì	Whatì Airport	Suspended 12 October 2025
Northwest Territories	Wekweètì	Wekweètì Airport	
Northwest Territories	Yellowknife	Yellowknife Airport	Hub

== Fleet ==
As of 29 April 2026, Air Tindi had the following aircraft listed with Transport Canada and Air Tindi:

Air Tindi fleet
Aircraft	No. of aircraft (TC list)	No. of aircraft (AT list)	Variants	Notes
Beechcraft Super King Air	6	4	3 - Model 200GT; 3 - Model B300	The 200 is a MEDEVAC aircraft and in that configuration cany carry up to five passengers. Air Tindi lists three King Air 250 (200GT, 200CGT) and one King Air 350, that can carry up to eight passengers
Cessna 208	1	1	208 Caravan	Floatplane that can carry up to seven passengers
de Havilland Canada DHC-6 Twin Otter	7	6	Series 300	Can operate on various types of landing gear, including skis, floats, wheels, and tundra tires. Carries up to 17 passengers
de Havilland Canada Dash 7	11	6	4 - DHC-7-102; 7 - DHC-7-103	Combi aircraft (freight and passenger configuration). Can carry 46 passengers and has a maximum payload of 12,500 lb (5,700 kg)
De Havilland Canada Dash 8	1	2	1 - Series 100; 1 - Series 300	100 series is a combi aircraft capable of carrying 21, 29, or 37 passengers and has a maximum payload of 8,300 lb (3,800 kg). The 300 carries up to 44 passengers and a maximum payload of 14,000 lb (6,400 kg). The TC site shows one Series 100
Total	26	19		

== Accidents and incidents ==
- On 24 June 2005, a de Havilland Canada DHC-3 Otter, C-FXUY, crashed into a bay and landed on its left side during a charter flight from Yellowknife Airport. Both crew members and seven passengers survived and the aircraft received substantial damage.
- On 4 October 2011, a Cessna 208B Grand Caravan operating as Air Tindi Flight 200 en route from Yellowknife Airport to Lutselk'e Airport crashed about 25 km (16 mi) west of the community. There were, including the pilot, four people on the aircraft and two were reported killed. The condition of the two survivors was not disclosed, but they had been sent to Stanton Territorial Hospital in Yellowknife.
- On 20 November 2014, a Cessna 208B Grand Caravan operating as Air Tindi Flight 223 crashed into a frozen surface of the North Arm of Great Slave Lake near Yellowknife in icing conditions and low visibility. The pilot and all five passengers survived but the plane sustained substantial damage.
- On 30 January 2019, an Air Tindi King Air 200, C-GTUC, was en route from Yellowknife to Whatì Airport in instrument meteorological conditions, and crashed about 21 nautical miles (39 km; 24 mi) east southeast of the community of Whatì. The two crew, who were the sole occupants, were killed. The investigation determined that both attitude indicators had failed, one prior to departure and one in-flight.
- On 31 January 2022, a Beechcraft 350 Super King Air owned by Air Tindi, C-GEAS, was being operated by the 8 Wing Multi Engine Utility Flight mission when it overshot a runway at Thunder Bay Airport in Thunder Bay, Ontario. The three crew members survived.
- In December 2023, an Air Tindi De Havilland DHC-6 Twin Otter made a controlled flight into terrain (CFIT) while on approach to Lac de Gras. All two pilots and eight passengers survived with minor injuries, except two of the passengers who sustained major injuries. The aircraft suffered extensive damage.
