= Northwestern Air Flight 738 =

2024 aviation accident in Canada

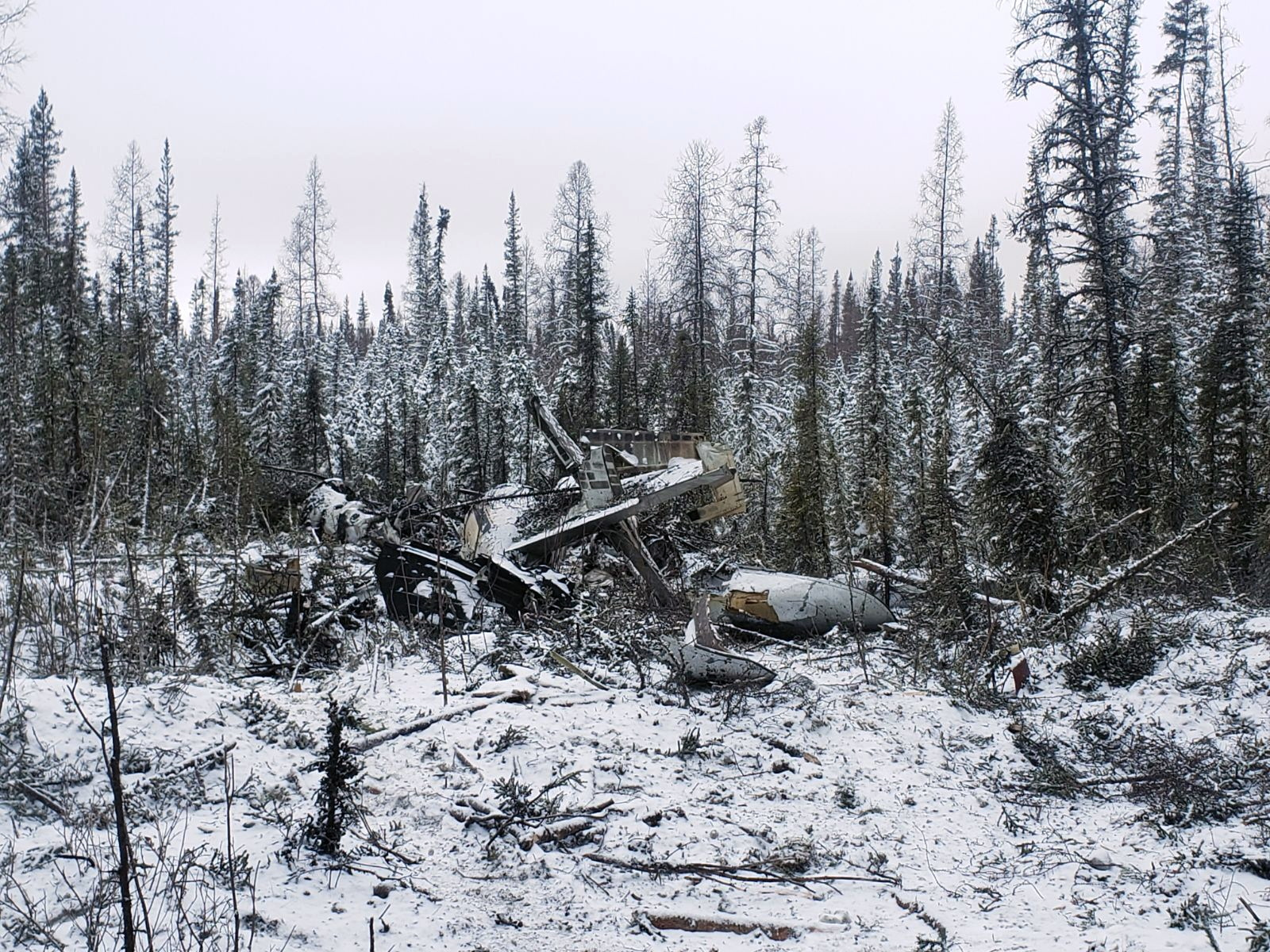
- Wreckage of the aircraft

Accident
- Date: 23 January 2024
- Summary: Mechanical failure and pilot error leading to Controlled flight into terrain
- Site: near Fort Smith Airport, Fort Smith, Northwest Territories, South Slave Region, Canada; 60°1′42.64″N 111°59′50.80″W

Aircraft
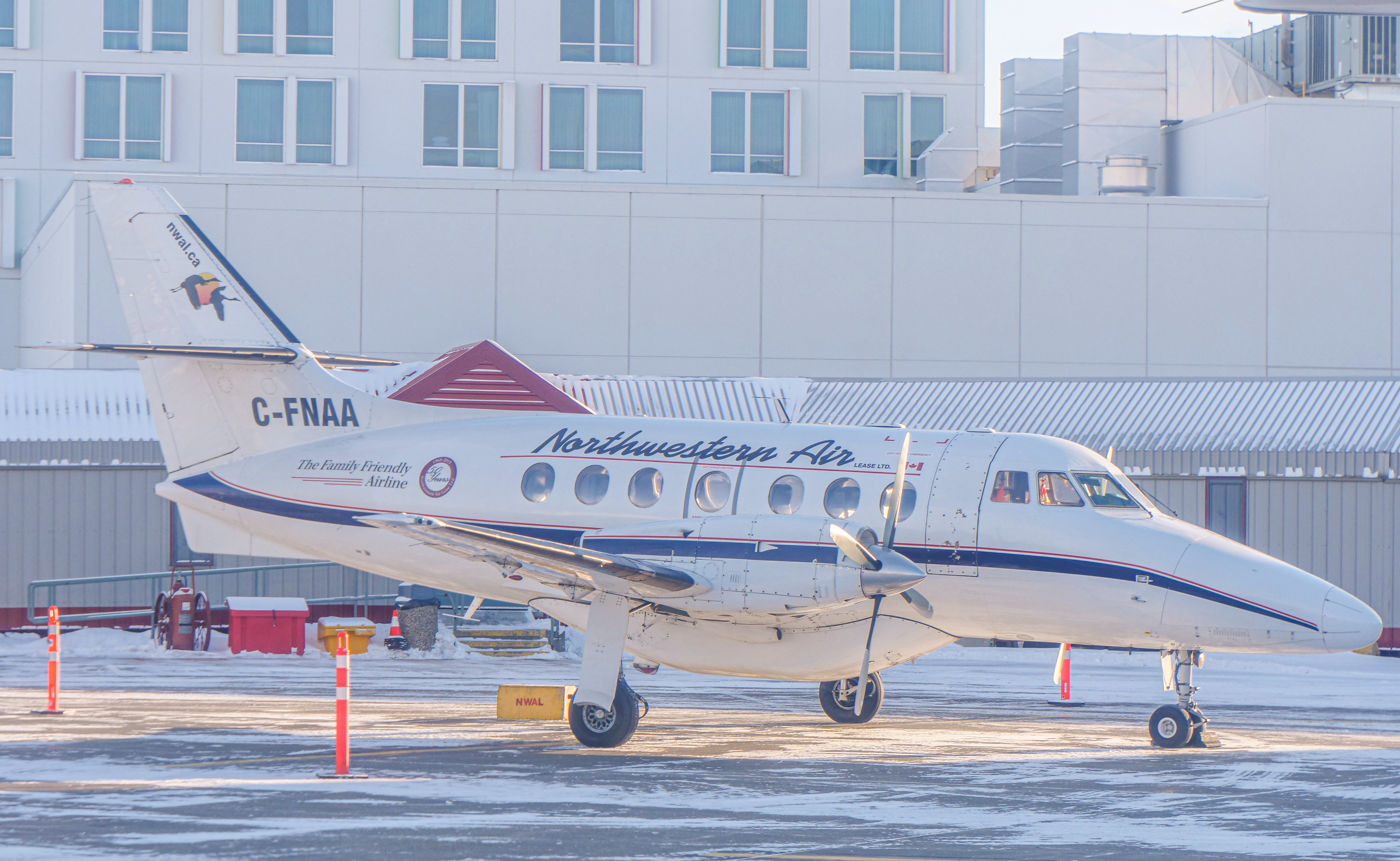
- C-FNAA, the aircraft involved in the accident seen in 2020
- Aircraft type: British Aerospace Jetstream 32
- Operator: Northwestern Air
- IATA flight No.: J3738
- ICAO flight No.: PLR738
- Call sign: POLARIS 738
- Registration: C-FNAA
- Flight origin: Fort Smith Airport
- Destination: Diavik Diamond Mine Airport
- Occupants: 7
- Passengers: 5
- Crew: 2
- Fatalities: 6
- Injuries: 1
- Survivors: 1

On 23 January 2024, Northwestern Air Flight 738, a British Aerospace Jetstream, was chartered by the Rio Tinto Group to carry mine workers from Fort Smith to the Diavik Diamond Mine, located around 300 km (190 mi) northeast of Yellowknife. The aircraft crashed shortly after takeoff, 1,200 m (3,900 ft) from the runway near Fort Smith Airport, killing six of the seven passengers and crew. The only survivor was taken to the Fort Smith Health Centre and was later airlifted to the Stanton Territorial Hospital in Yellowknife for further treatment.

== Aircraft ==
The aircraft involved was a BAe-3212 Jetstream Super 31, MSN 929, registered as C-FNAA, manufactured by British Aerospace in 1991. The aircraft had suffered a previous incident on 1 April 2019 where it departed the runway while landing at Fort Chipewyan, Canada.

== Accident ==
Shortly after taking off from runway 30, the aircraft reached a maximum altitude of 140 feet and ground speed of 160 knots, then entered into a descent from which it did not recover, hitting trees around 938 m from the runway and crashed 1265 m from the end of the runway and 98 m left of the center-line. After the crash, an extensive post-crash fire broke out, which destroyed 80% of the wreckage. The sole survivor was ejected from the aircraft during the accident sequence and suffered minor injuries. Four mine employees and both pilots were killed.

== Investigation ==
The Transportation Safety Board of Canada sent a team, which included lead investigator Jeremy Warkentin to investigate the cause of the crash. Although the aircraft was not equipped with a full flight data recorder, the cockpit voice recorder was recovered.

The Transportation Safety Board of Canada (TSB) classified the investigation as Class 2, indicating a complex investigation with an expected duration of up to 600 days. The investigation team has conducted multiple interviews, analyzed good-quality FDR data, and reviewed CCTV footage from fuelling, passenger loading, and departure. Examination of the engines and propellers revealed no anomalies, and aircraft performance analysis determined that snow on critical surfaces did not negatively affect performance. A preliminary report was released sometime in March 2024.

=== Final report ===
On March 5, 2026, the TSB released the final report. They determined after one of the landing gear had failed to retract, the crew reduced power to the engines to reduce the airspeed and allow the gear to retract. During this process, they were preoccupied with the gear indications and did not notice the loss of altitude that came from the decreased power.

== See also ==
- Eastern Air Lines Flight 401 & Ansett New Zealand Flight 703, two other flights where the crew became distracted with the landing gear, causing a loss of altitude
