= Northwestern Air =

Canadian airline

Northwestern Air Lease

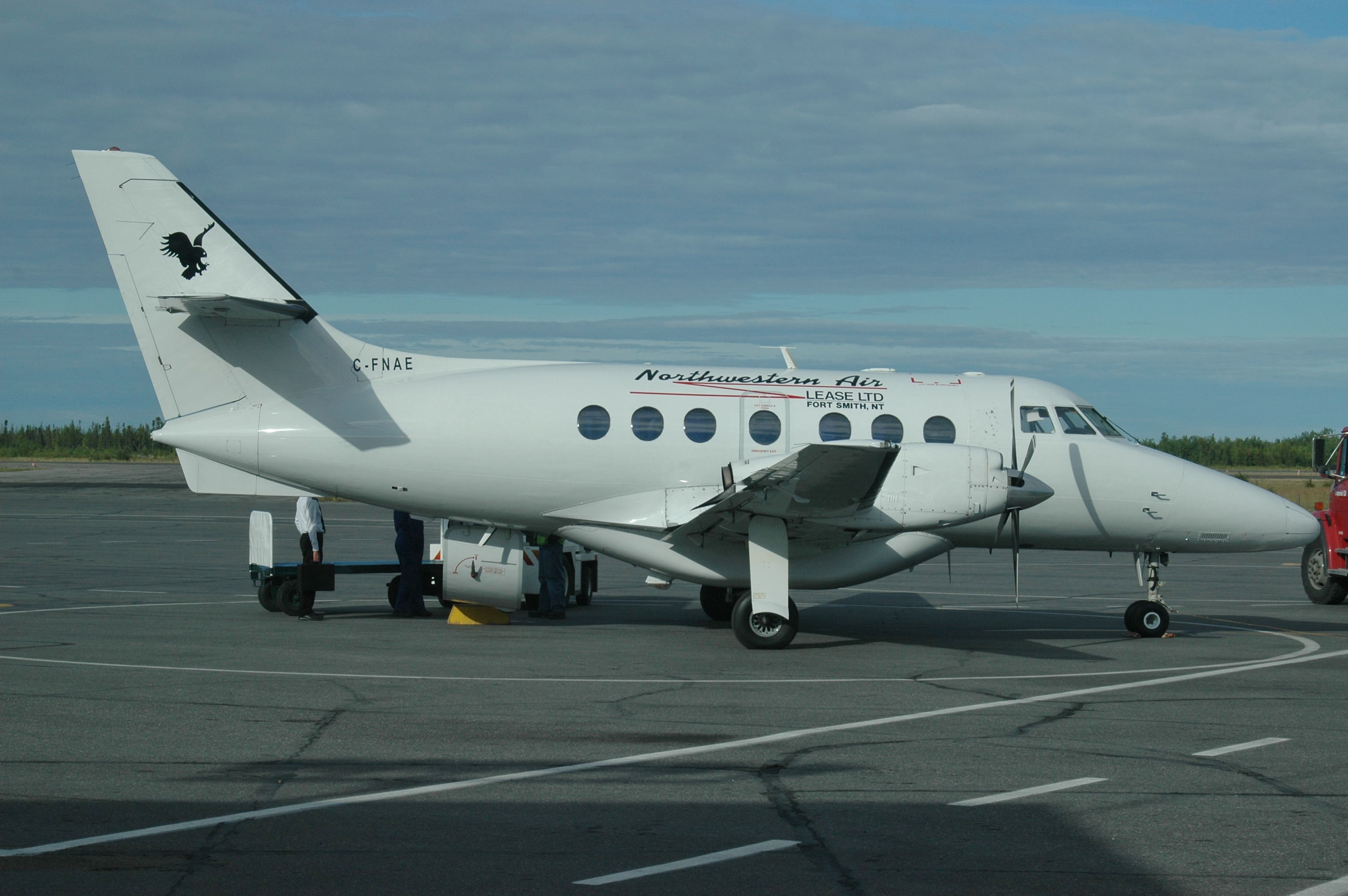
- Northwestern Air British Aerospace Jetstream
IATA	ICAO	Call sign
J3	PLR	POLARIS
- Founded: 1965
- AOC #: 271
- Fleet size: 14
- Destinations: 6
- Headquarters: Fort Smith, Northwest Territories
- Key people: Terry Harrold (President); Brian Harrold (Vice-President); Debbie Payne (Director of Finance)
- Website: https://www.nwal.ca/

Northwestern Air is an airline based in Fort Smith, Northwest Territories, Canada. It operates ad hoc charters and long-term charter contracts for various corporations throughout Canada and the United States. Previously, it operated scheduled passenger services to seven destinations in two territories/provinces.

Its main base is Fort Smith Airport.

== History ==
The airline was established in 1965 as a leasing company and started flying operations in 1968. It expanded to operate scheduled passenger services in 1984. It is wholly owned by the Harrold family and had more than 70 employees in September 2018.

On 18 December 2024 the airline announced it would be terminating scheduled operations on 16 January 2025 to concentrate on contract charters using its Cessna fleet. Air Tindi would be taking over the scheduled routes. The airline cited the ages of Terry and Brian Harold, as well as challenges with pilot recruitment as the reasons for the decision.

== Destinations ==
As of January 2024, the airline schedule served the following locations:

Province/territory	City	Airport	Notes
Alberta	Edmonton	Edmonton International Airport	
Alberta	Fort Chipewyan	Fort Chipewyan Airport	
Alberta	Fort McMurray	Fort McMurray International Airport	
Alberta	High Level	High Level Airport	
Northwest Territories	Fort Smith	Fort Smith Airport	Hub
Northwest Territories	Hay River	Hay River/Merlyn Carter Airport	
Northwest Territories	Yellowknife	Yellowknife Airport	

== Fleet ==
As of January 2024, the Northwestern Air fleet includes fourteen aircraft registered with Transport Canada and ten listed at the Northwestern Air web site:

Northwestern Air fleet
Aircraft	In service (TC)	In service (PLR)	Variants	Notes
British Aerospace Jetstream	8	10	3100, 3200	Transport Canada lists three 3100 and five 3200. Northwestern lists five of each.
Cessna 172	1	0	172N	
Cessna 185 Skywagon	1	1	A185F	
Cessna 206	2	2	U206	One each U206E and U206G
Cessna 210 Centurion	1	1	210L	
Piper PA-34 Seneca	1	0	PA-34-220T	
Total	14	14		

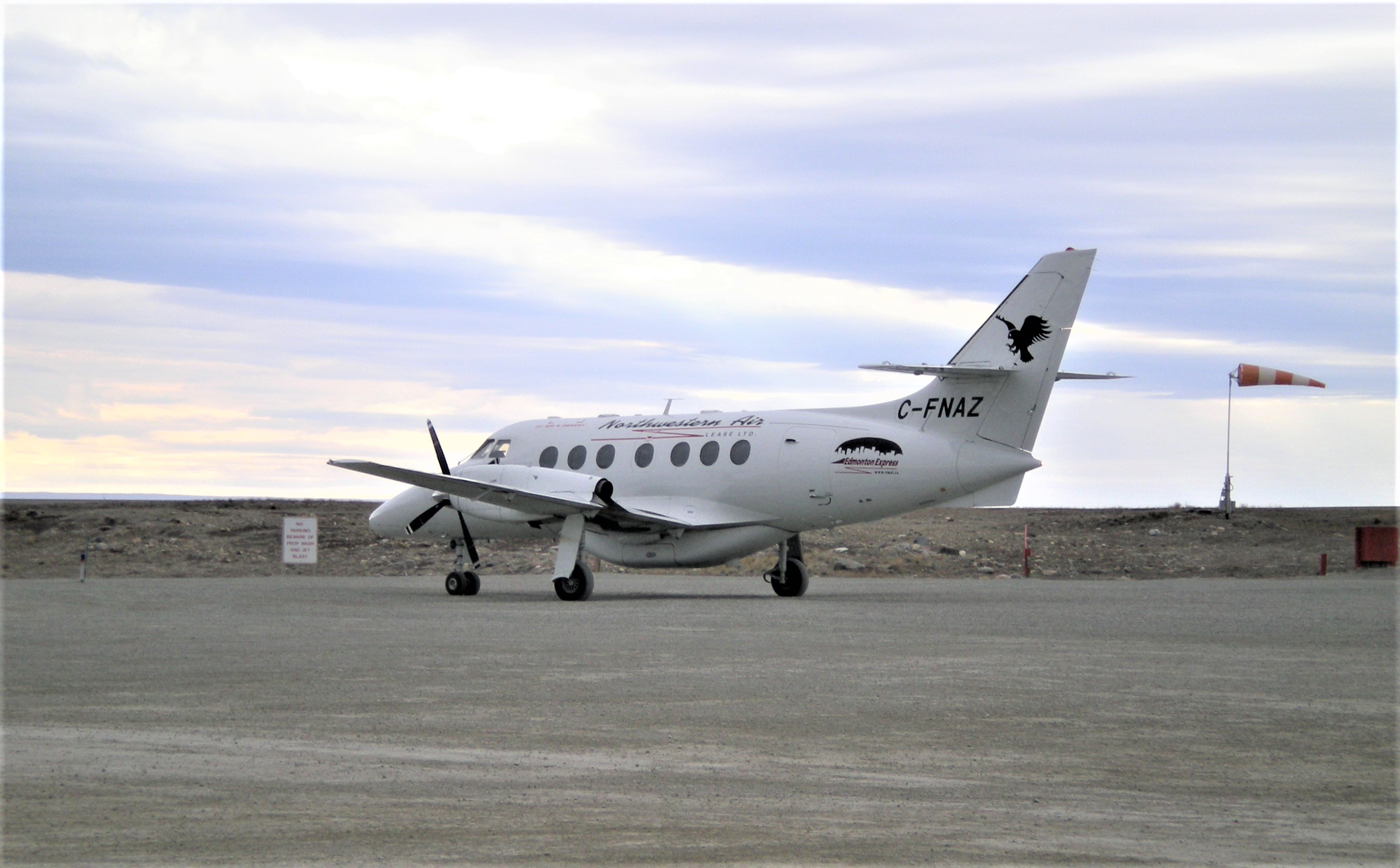
A British Aerospace Jetstream at Cambridge Bay Airport

Previously operated include:

- Piper Aerostar
- Beechcraft Queen Air
- Beechcraft Baron
- Beechcraft Model 99
- Cessna 150
- Cessna 172
- Cessna 208
- Cessna 310
- Cessna Skymaster
- Cessna 401 and 402
- de Havilland Canada DHC-2 Beaver
- de Havilland Canada DHC-3 Otter
- North American B-25 Mitchell
- Piper PA-16 Clipper
- Fairchild Swearingen Metroliner

== Accidents and incidents ==
- On 23 January 2024, Northwestern Air Flight 738 crashed shortly after takeoff from Fort Smith Airport, killing six people and injuring one. The British Aerospace Jetstream was a charter to Diavik Airport at the Diavik Diamond Mine.
