= Arctic Sunwest Charters =

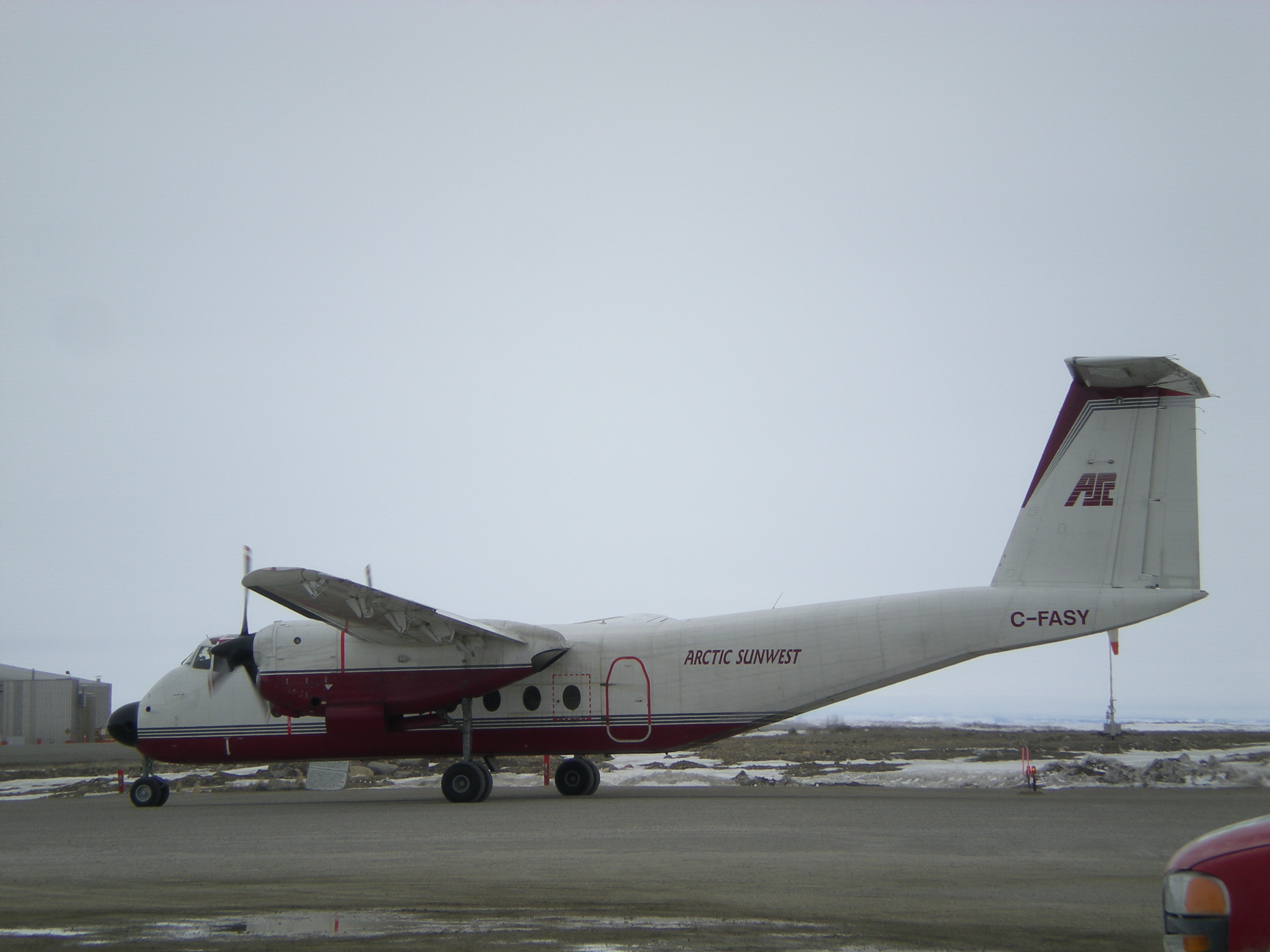
IATA	ICAO	Call sign
-	-	Arctic Sunwest
- Founded: 1989
- Hubs: Yellowknife Airport
- Parent company: Ledcor Group of Companies
- Headquarters: Yellowknife, Northwest Territories, Canada, 62°27′59″N 114°24′55″W

8199400 Canada Inc. operating as Arctic Sunwest Charters was a charter airline based in Yellowknife, Northwest Territories, Canada. It operated passenger and cargo charter services in Canada's Arctic, with wheel, ski and float equipped aircraft. Its main base was Yellowknife Airport and also operated a float base on Great Slave Lake near the Yellowknife Water Aerodrome.

== History ==
The airline was established in 1989 and was created from the Aviation Division of RTL-Robinson Enterprises. On the 31 August 2012, Arctic Sunwest Charters became part of the Ledcor Group of Companies. In 2013 it was fully integrated into its affiliate Summit Air.

== Maintenance ==
The company was certified by Transport Canada as an Approved Maintenance Organization with aircraft maintenance engineers. They had 52,000 ft^{2} (4,800 m^{2}) of hangar space available and provided maintenance services to other airlines.

== Fleet ==
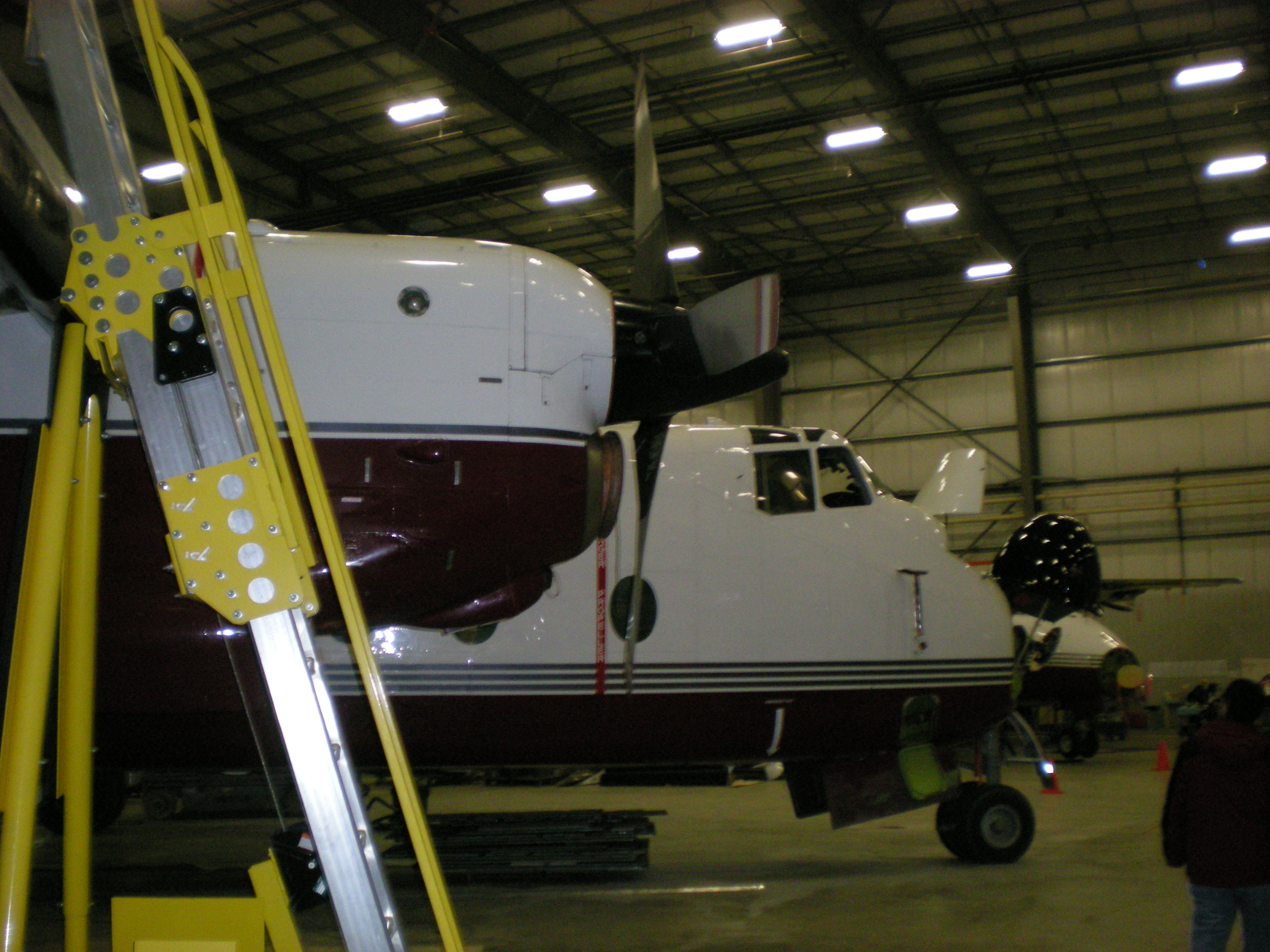
FASV an Arctic Sunwest de Havilland Canada DHC-5 Buffalo undergoing regular maintenance

As of October 2012 the Arctic Sunwest Charters fleet consisted of the following aircraft:

Arctic Sunwest fleet
Aircraft	No. of Aircraft	Variants	Idents	Notes
Beechcraft Model 99	1		GASW	12 passengers. No longer in TC database
Beechcraft King Air	1	100 series	FASN	7 passengers. Now owned by Island Express Air
de Havilland Canada DHC-2 Beaver	2	DHC-2 MK. III	FOEV, FOPE	8 passengers, skis, amphibious. Now part of Summit Air.
de Havilland Canada DHC-5 Buffalo	2	DHC-5A	FASV, FASY	Cargo up to 18,000 lb (8,200 kg), the only civil Buffalo aircraft operating in Canada Now part of Summit Air.
de Havilland Canada DHC-6 Twin Otter	3	100 series, 300 series	FASQ, FTFX, FTXQ	Combi, 19 passengers or 3,300 lb (1,500 kg), floats, skis, tundra tires. Now part of Summit Air.
de Havilland Canada Dash 8	2	DHC-8-102	FASC, GASB	Combi, 37 passengers or 7,428 lb (3,369 kg). Now part of Summit Air.
Piper PA-31 Navajo	2	PA-31-350	FKCL, FSWN	8 passengers. Now part of Summit Air.

== Accidents and incidents ==
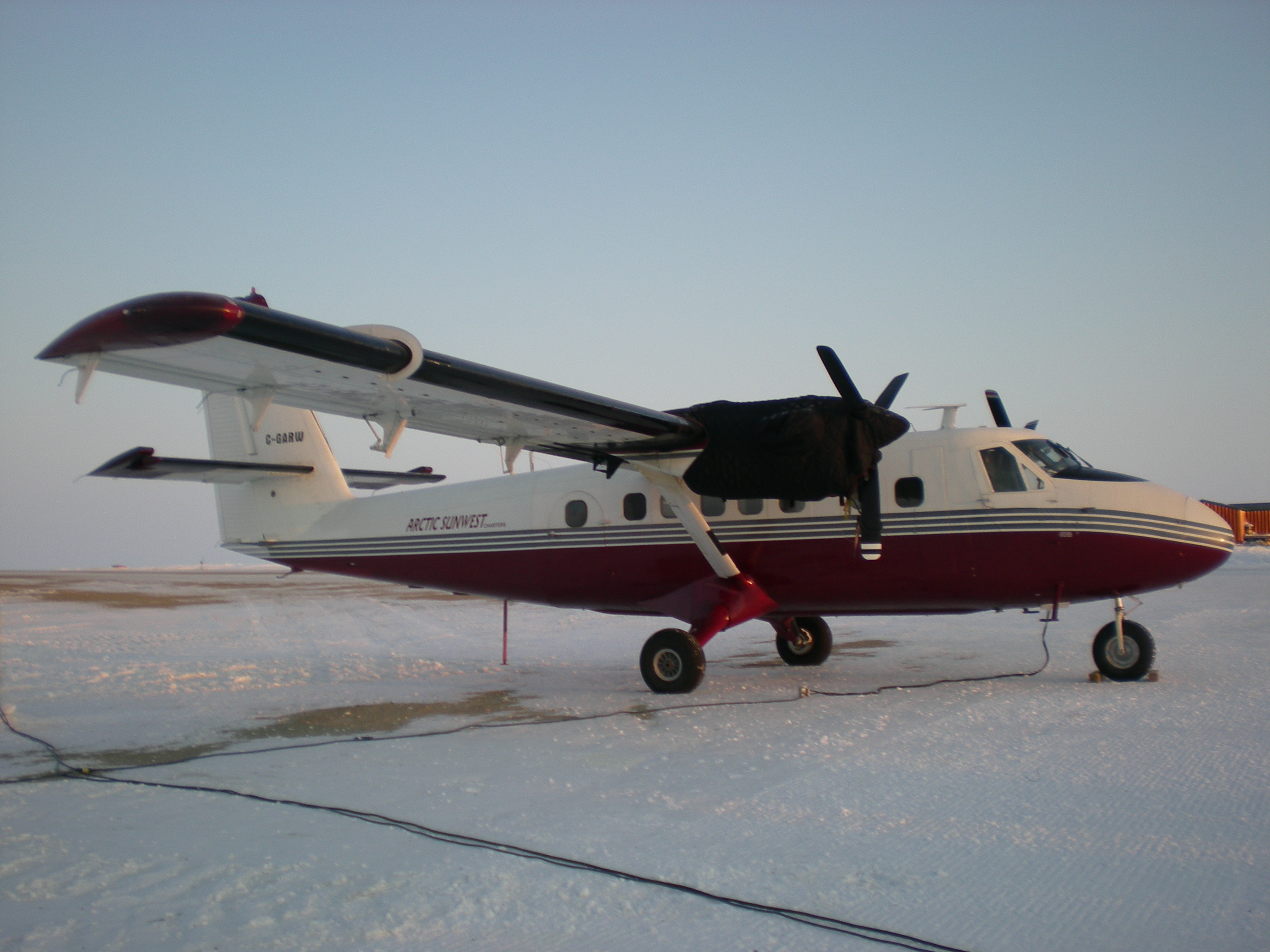
Arctic Sunwest Charters de Havilland Canada DHC-6 Twin Otter GARW at Cambridge Bay Airport

On 22 September 2011, a float equipped Arctic Sunwest Twin Otter, that had been charted by Avalon Rare Metals, crashed while landing at Yellowknife Water Aerodrome. The Twin Otter, GARW, was inbound from Thor Lake and carried seven passengers and two crew. All seven of the passengers were injured and both pilots were killed.

== See also ==
- List of defunct airlines of Canada
