= Fort Chipewyan Airport =

- IATA: YPY; ICAO: CYPY; WMO: 71933

Summary
- Airport type: Public
- Operator: Regional Municipality of Wood Buffalo
- Location: Wood Buffalo, near Fort Chipewyan, Alberta
- Time zone: Alberta Time (UTC−06:00)
- Elevation AMSL: 761 ft / 232 m
- Coordinates: 58°46′02″N 111°07′02″W

Map
- Location in Alberta

Runways
Direction	Length		Surface
Direction	ft	m	Surface
04/22	5,000	1,524	Asphalt
- Source: Canada Flight Supplement; Environment Canada

Fort Chipewyan Airport (IATA: YPY, ICAO: CYPY) is located 3 nautical miles (5.6 km; 3.5 mi) northeast of Fort Chipewyan, Alberta, Canada.

== Airlines and destinations ==
=== Passenger ===
Airlines	Destinations
Air Tindi	Edmonton, Fort Smith, Yellowknife
McMurray Aviation	Fort McMurray

== See also ==
- Fort Chipewyan/Small Lake Water Aerodrome
