= Summit Helicopters =

Canadian aviation company

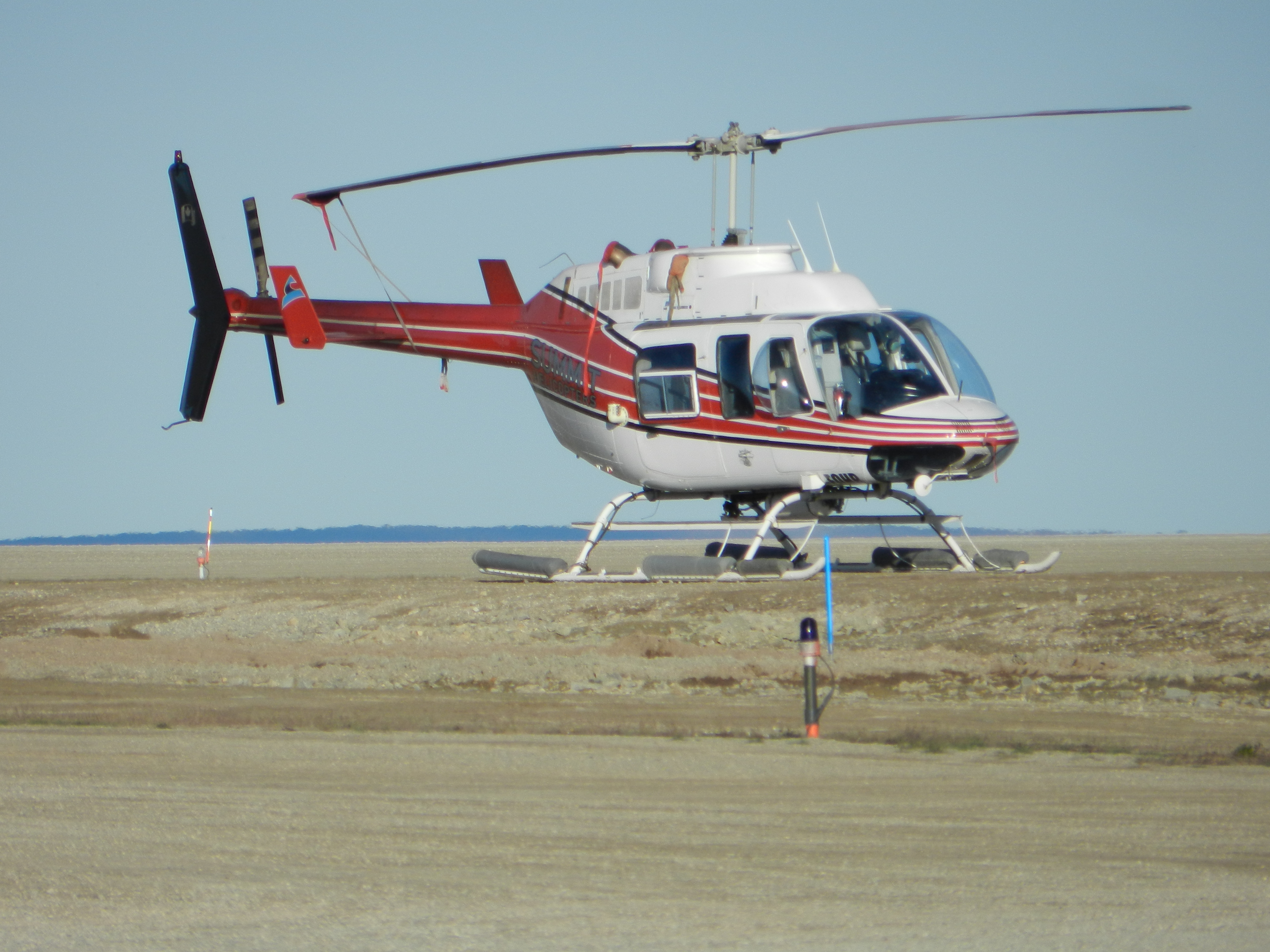
- A Bell 206 at Cambridge Bay Airport
IATA	CDD	Call sign
-	KM	KAMI
- Founded: 2013
- Hubs: Yellowknife Airport
- Fleet size: 10
- Parent company: Ledcor Group of Companies
- Headquarters: Yellowknife, Northwest Territories, Canada
- Website: summithelicopters.ca

Summit Helicopters is a Canadian aviation company that provides charter services throughout remote areas of western and northern Canada as well as the United Kingdom and Indonesia. Summit Helicopters is a member of the Ledcor Group of Companies and is a sister company to Summit Air.

Summit Helicopters operates two different types of helicopters, all equipped with "onboard satellite phone, portable phone, next generation satellite tracking, and Transport Canada approved medevac kit." Depending on the service, required optional equipment includes "wildlife antennae, camera mounts, utility baskets, and emergency and fixed floats".

== History ==
The Det'on Cho Corporation and three Yellowknife residents, Rob Carroll, Kevin Lang and Geoff Furniss, founded Trinity Helicopters in 2009. They quickly grew to a fleet of 17 helicopters operating in all three northern Canadian territories.

In January 2013, Ledcor Air Limited, a member of the Ledcor Group of Companies, purchased Trinity Helicopters and subsequently renamed the company Summit Helicopters.

Summit acquired CC Helicopters of Kamloops in 2014. CC Helicopters had over 30 years of experience in the British Columbia Interior and operated a fleet of light, intermediate, and medium helicopters with instrument flight rules (IFR) and visual flight rules (VFR) crews based at Kamloops Airport and Lillooet Airport. CC Helicopters also specialized in BC Air Ambulance medevac, oil and gas exploration and support, forestry survey and protection, environmental and wildlife survey, and power line support.

In addition to its headquarters in Yellowknife, Summit Helicopters now operates out of five bases: Kamloops, Terrace (Northwest Regional Airport Terrace-Kitimat), Fort McMurray (Fort McMurray International Airport), Lillooet, and Norman Wells (Norman Wells Airport).

== Fleet ==
As of September 2024, Summit Helicopters has the following aircraft registered with Transport Canada (TC).

Summit Helicopters
Aircraft	No. of Aircraft	Variants	Notes
Bell 407	6		Seats six plus pilot, has a cruise speed of 150 mph (240 km/h; 130 kn) and can carry 1,900 lb (860 kg) internally and 2,550 lb (1,160 kg) externally.
Bell 412	4	Bell 412EP	Seats fourteen plus pilot, has a cruise speed of 150 mph (240 km/h; 130 kn) and can carry 4,200 lb (1,900 kg) internally and 3,000 lb (1,400 kg) externally. Listed at Summit Helicopters as a Bell 412SP and by TC as a Bell 412EP
Total	10		
