= Avalon Advanced Materials =

Canadian mineral extraction company

Avalon Advanced Materials Inc
- Type: Public
- Traded as: TSX: AVL OTCQB: AVLNF
- Industry: Metals & mining
- Headquarters: Toronto, Ontario, Canada
- Key people: Scott Monteith (CEO) Jim Andersen (VP Finance, Corporate Secretary & CFO); Zeeshan Syed (President); Rickardo Welyhorsky (VP Operations); Andrew Ramcharan (VP Corporate Development); Cindy Hu (Controller) Amiel Blajchman (Sustainability Manager)
- Products: lithium, petalite, tin, neodymium, praseodymium, dysprosium, tantalum, cesium, calcium feldspar, rare-earth elements
- Website: avalonadvancedmaterials.com

Avalon Advanced Materials Inc. is a Canadian mineral development company with a primary focus on the rare metals and minerals, headquartered in Toronto, Ontario, Canada. Avalon's principal assets are its Nechalacho Project (Yellowknife, Northwest Territories), Separation Rapids (near Minaki, Ontario), East Kemptville, Nova Scotia, Lilypad Cesium (near Ignace, Ontario), and Warren Township (Ontario).

Avalon is listed on the Toronto Stock Exchange under the symbol "AVL" and on the OTCQB market under the symbol "AVLNF". The company changed its name from Avalon Rare Metals to Avalon Advanced Materials in February 2016.

== Projects ==
=== Nechalacho Rare Earth Elements and Zirconium Project ===
Avalon's Nechalacho REE and Zirconium Project is located 100 km southeast of Yellowknife in the Northwest Territories, Canada. Avalon completed a Feasibility Study in April 2013, focused on defining high-grade resources in the large basal zone of the deposit.

On July 29, 2013, the Mackenzie Valley Environmental Impact Review Board completed its Report of Environmental Assessment and recommended approval of the Nechalacho Project. On November 4, 2013, the Federal government approved the project, allowing the company to proceed with formal applications for the required land use permits and water licenses.

As rare earth prices fell, the project become largely inactive. In May 2018, Avalon announced it was re-activating the project on the global demand for neodymium and praseodymium and in January 2019 it was announced that Avalon and private Australian company Cheetah Resources Pty Ltd would be collaborating to develop the T-Zone and Tardiff Zones of the project. Cheetah is focused on the small-scale development of rare earth resources enriched in the magnet rare earths—neodymium and praseodymium—presently in short supply and high demand for clean technology applications.

The Nechalacho Project at Thor Lake is situated in an area known as the Akaitcho Territory, which is subject to a comprehensive land claim negotiation between several communities of the Dene Nation and Canada's federal government. In 2012, Avalon completed an Accommodation Agreement with the Deninu Kue First Nation. The Accommodation Agreement provides business and employment opportunities for the Deninu Kue related to the project and contains measures to mitigate environmental and cultural impacts that may result from the project development. In February 2014, the company signed a Participation Agreement with the Northwest Territory Metis Nation.

=== Lake Superior Lithium Inc. ===
Lake Superior Lithium Inc. (LSLi) is a 100% wholly owned subsidiary of Avalon Advanced Materials Inc., focused on developing Ontario’s first lithium hydroxide processing facility. The project aims to support North America's growing electric vehicle (EV) and battery supply chains by producing battery-grade lithium hydroxide from multiple lithium concentrate sources.

=== Separation Rapids Lithium Project ===
Avalon is also developing a lithium (petalite) deposit, located 70 km north of Kenora in Ontario, Canada. The Separation Rapids property is host to a large "complex-type" pegmatite; it is the fourth example in the world of a rare-metal pegmatite with the size required to be of major economic importance. The strike length of the deposit is over 1.5 km, and the width ranges from 10 to 70 metres. The mineralized zone is well exposed at surface in a low dome-shaped hill. This part of the deposit will be readily amenable to mining by low-cost quarrying methods. Avalon has demonstrated it is able to produce high-purity petalite from the deposit, for use in the glass-ceramics industry, as well as battery-grade lithium chemicals for use in the lithium-ion battery sector.

The property lies within the traditional land use area of the Wabaseemoong Independent Nations of Whitedog, Ontario. In August 1999, Avalon signed a Memorandum of Understanding with WIN which was renewed in May 2013.

=== Lilypad Cesium-Tantalum Project ===
The Lilypad property consists of 14 claims covering 3,108 hectares located approximately 350 kilometres north of Thunder Bay, near the community of Fort Hope in the traditional territory of the Eabametoong First Nation. Work at Lilypad in 2001–2002 focused on defining tantalum resources, but was also successful in identifying widespread occurrences of the cesium ore mineral pollucite in a field of highly fractionated lithium-cesium-tantalum pegmatite dykes. In October 2020, Avalon carried out a short field program to collect 200 kilograms of cesium mineralized pegmatite rock for study on how to efficiently concentrate the pollucite mineralization which is found widely distributed throughout the many LCT pegmatite dykes on the property.

=== East Kemptville Tin Project ===
The East Kemptville Tin Project is located approximately 45 km northeast of Yarmouth, Nova Scotia in the vicinity of the former East Kemptville Tin Mine. In May 2014, Avalon entered into an agreement with the surface rights holder to secure access to lands held under the Special Licence for a limited drilling program, to confirm historic estimates of tin-copper-zinc resources remaining in the ground after production ceased at the East Kemptville mine in 1992, and bring them into compliance with NI 43–101 for reporting purposes. In July 2018, Avalon announced the completion of a positive Preliminary Economic Assessment on the project. The company's re-development model, as presently conceived, is an environmental remediation project that will be financed through the sale of tin concentrates recovered in large part from previously mined mineralized material on the site.

== Corporate sustainability ==
In 2011, Avalon produced its first full corporate sustainability report, entitled Journey to a Sustainable Future, prepared within the framework of the GRI version G3.1. A 2020 Sustainability Report was released in November 2020.
