= Lutselk'e Airport =

Airport in Canada

- IATA: YSG; ICAO: CYLK; WMO: 71529

Summary
- Airport type: Public
- Operator: Government of the Northwest Territories
- Location: Lutselk'e, Northwest Territories
- Time zone: Northwest Territories Time (UTC−06:00)
- Elevation AMSL: 586 ft (179 m)
- Coordinates: 62°25′06″N 110°40′56″W

Map
- Location in the Northwest Territories

Runways
Direction	Length		Surface
Direction	ft	m	Surface
08/26	3,003	915	Gravel

Statistics (2010)
- Aircraft movements: 1,817
- Sources: Canada Flight Supplement; Environment Canada; Movements from Statistics Canada.

Lutselk'e Airport (IATA: YSG, ICAO: CYLK) is located 1.1 nautical miles (2.0 km; 1.3 mi) northeast of Lutselk'e, Northwest Territories, Canada. Caribou may be found on the runway and the local terrain makes this a difficult aerodrome to use at night.

== Airlines and destinations ==
Airlines	Destinations
Air Tindi	Yellowknife

== See also ==
- Lutselk'e Water Aerodrome
