= Summit Air =

Canadian airline

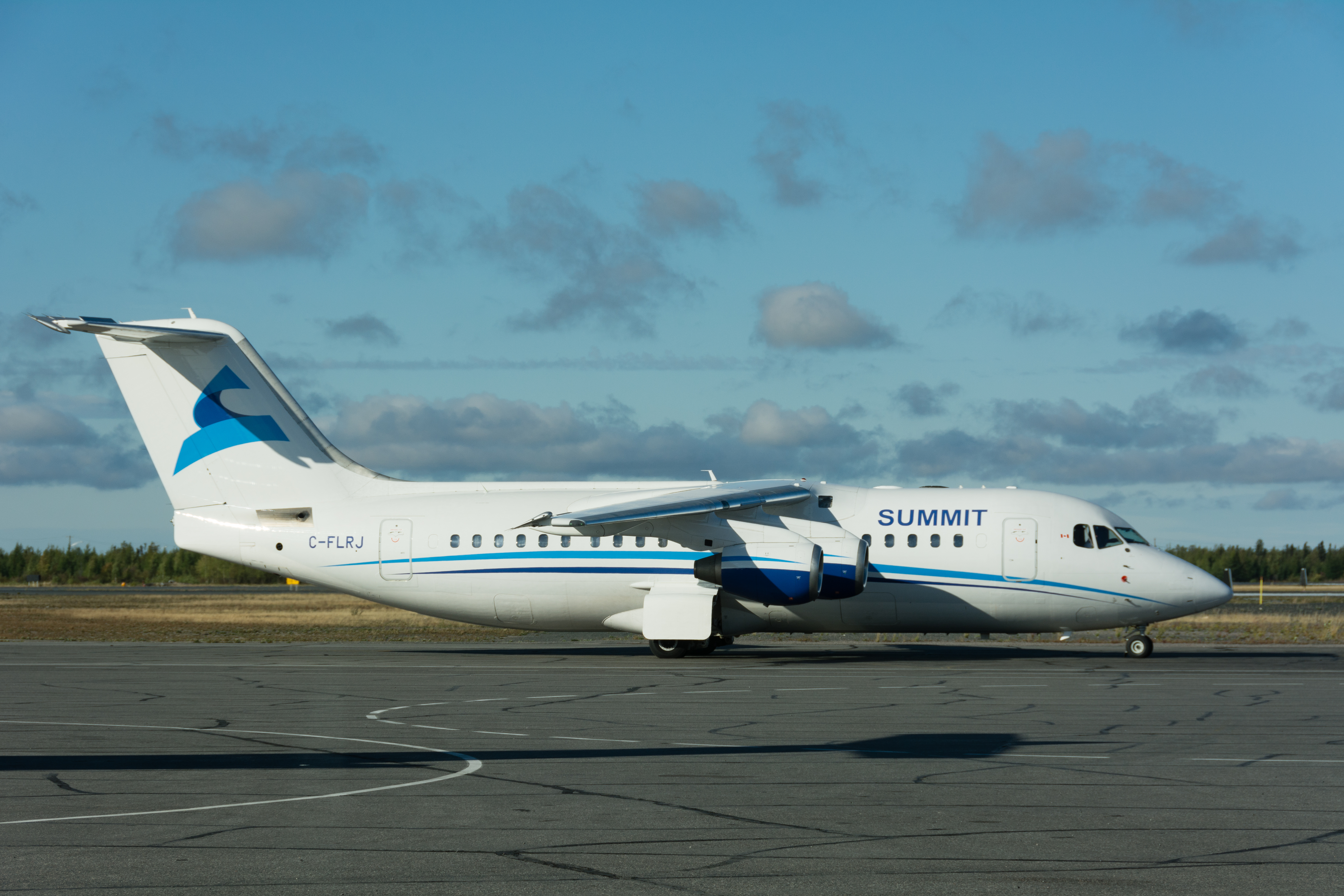
- Summit Air BAe 146 Avro RJ85
IATA	ICAO	Call sign
-	SUT	SUMMIT
- Founded: 1987
- AOC #: Canada: 17940; United States: RM7F460F
- Fleet size: 29
- Parent company: Ledcor Group of Companies
- Headquarters: Yellowknife, Northwest Territories, Canada
- Website: www.flysummitair.com

Summit Air (8199400 Canada Inc. is a Canadian airline headquartered in Yellowknife that operates scheduled, charter and cargo aviation throughout the Northwest Territories, Nunavut, and Yukon. Summit Air is a member of the Ledcor Group of Companies and operates in partnership with several other companies and communities including the Haisla Nation (Summit Kitamaat Aviation Limited Partnership), Air Baffin (Summit Air Baffin), the Det'on Cho Corporation (Det’on Cho Summit Aviation LP), and businesses in the Kitikmeot Region (Summit Air Kitikmeot).

Summit's head office is in Yellowknife and they operate in most of Western Canada with bases in Terrace, Lillooet, and Kamloops in British Columbia, and Fort McMurray, Edmonton, and Calgary in Alberta. In the Northwest Territories, their bases include Yellowknife and Norman Wells. They also operate out of the United Kingdom for the Ministry of Defence and the Falcon Demonstration Team, a parachute team of the Royal Air Force.

== History ==
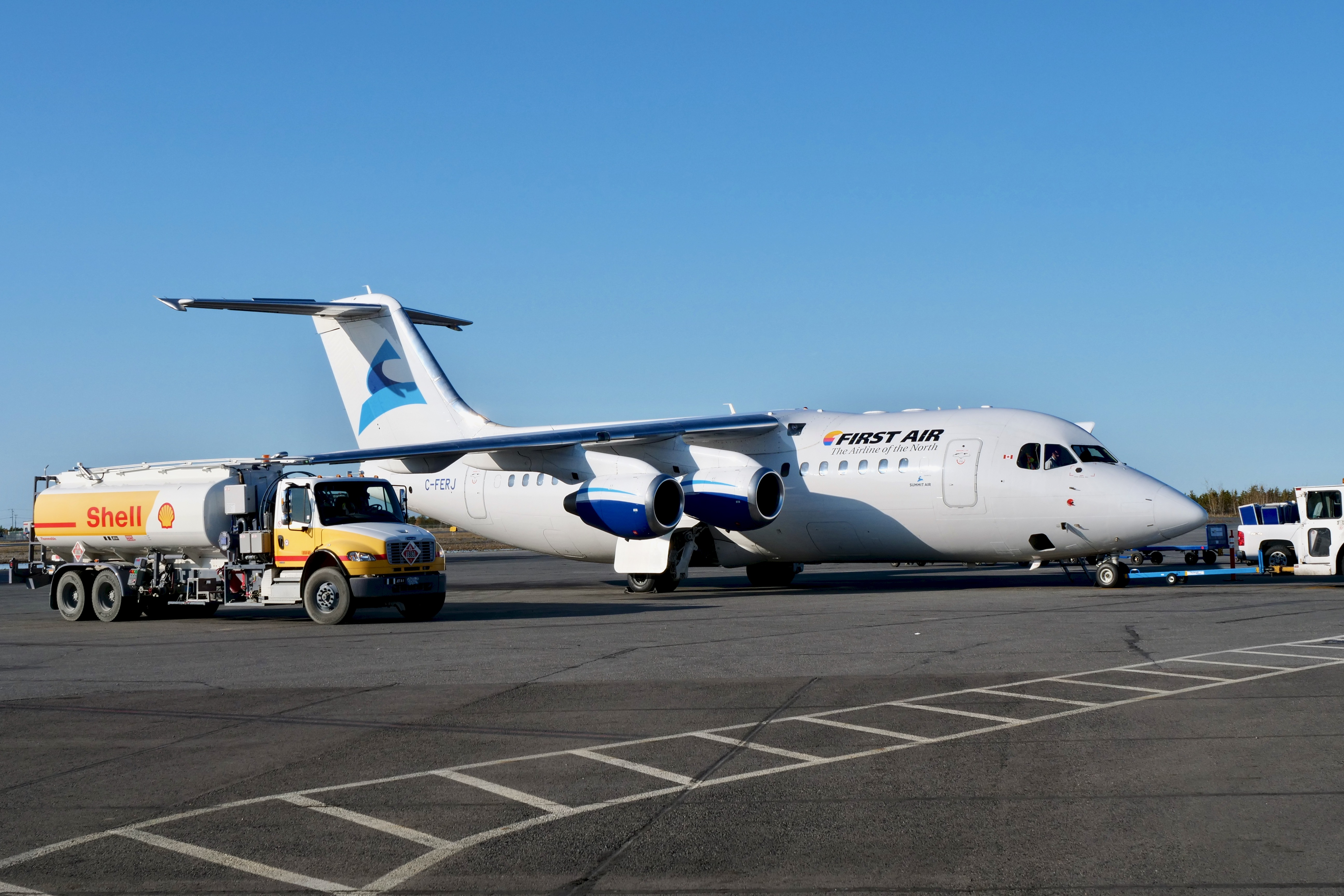
Summit Air Avro RJ85 operating for First Air (now Canadian North)

Summit Air started in Atlin, British Columbia in 1987. In January 2001, the base of operations was moved to Yellowknife. The Ledcor Group of Companies became a partner on June 1, 2009. In August, 2012 Summit acquired Arctic Sunwest Charters and all aircraft operated by them were re-branded as Summit.

In January 2015, the airline acquired an Avro RJ85 jet aircraft which is being operated by Summit for Canadian North for use on services from Yellowknife and Edmonton. A second Avro RJ85 has since been ordered and Summit Air has now added larger Avro RJ100 jet aircraft as well.

== Fleet ==
As of October 4, 2026, Summit Air has the following aircraft registered with Transport Canada:

Summit Air fleet
Aircraft	No. of aircraft	Variants	Notes
ATR 72	7	ATR 72–202	According to the Summit Air website they have four ATR-72, of which two are 68 seat passenger with two being dedicated cargo freighters. According to Transport Canada two are ATR-GIE and the rest are ATR.
British Aerospace 146 (Avro)	11	2 - Avro RJ85; 9 - Avro RJ100	The Summit website lists the RJ85 in a 90 seats configuration, and the RJ100 with 111 seats.
De Havilland Canada Dash 8	4	3 - DHC-8-102; 1 - DHC-8-311	Summit lists one DHC8-100 as a Combi aircraft, 20, 28 or 37 passengers. The DHC8-300 can accommodate 50 passengers.
Dornier 228	5	202	Combi aircraft, up to 19 passengers, STOL capable.
Short SC.7 Skyvan	2	Series 3	Up to 4,500 lb (2,000 kg) cargo freighter but may carry 9 passengers with the payload reduced by 1,000 lb (450 kg).
Total	29		

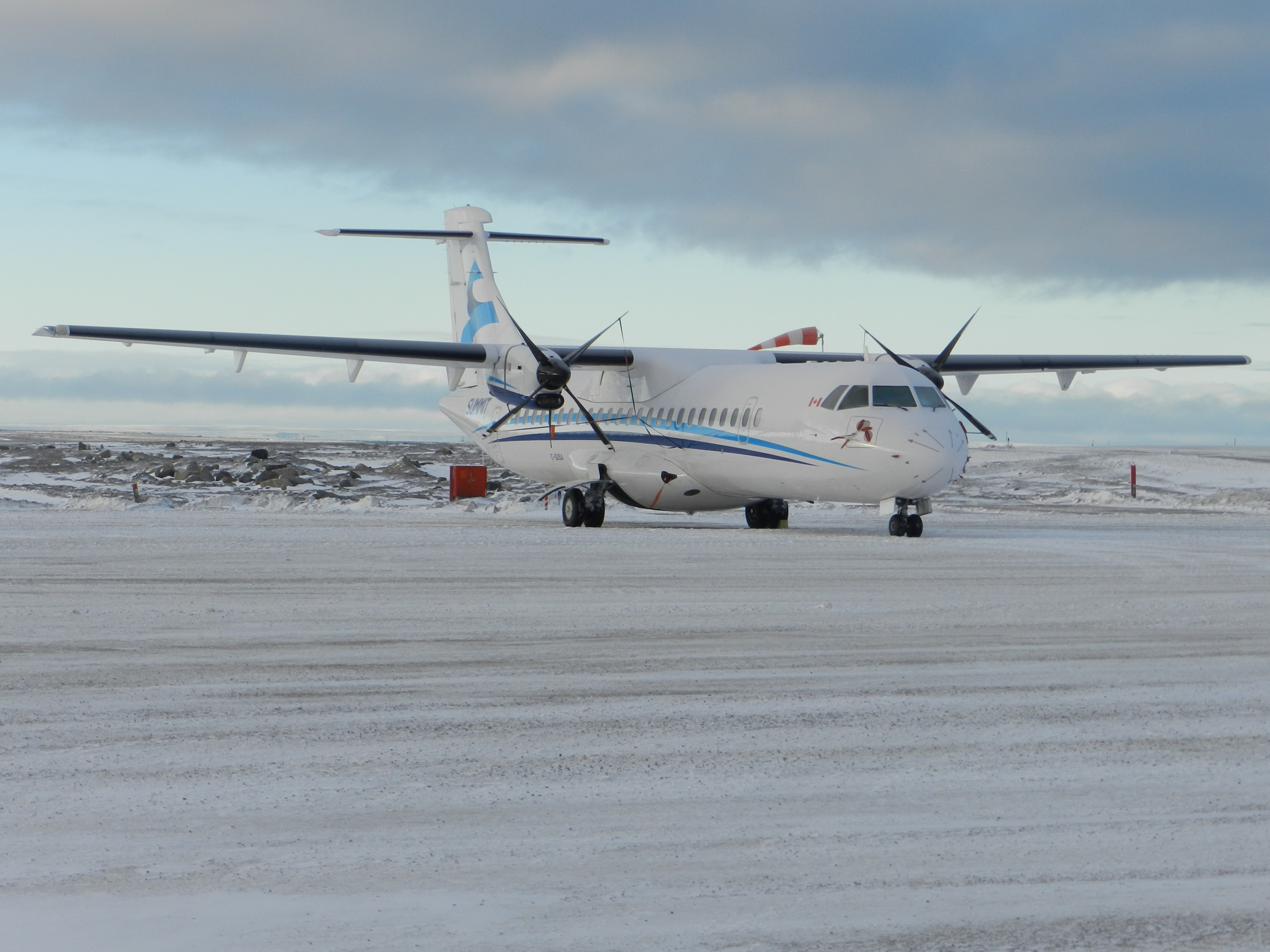
ATR 72

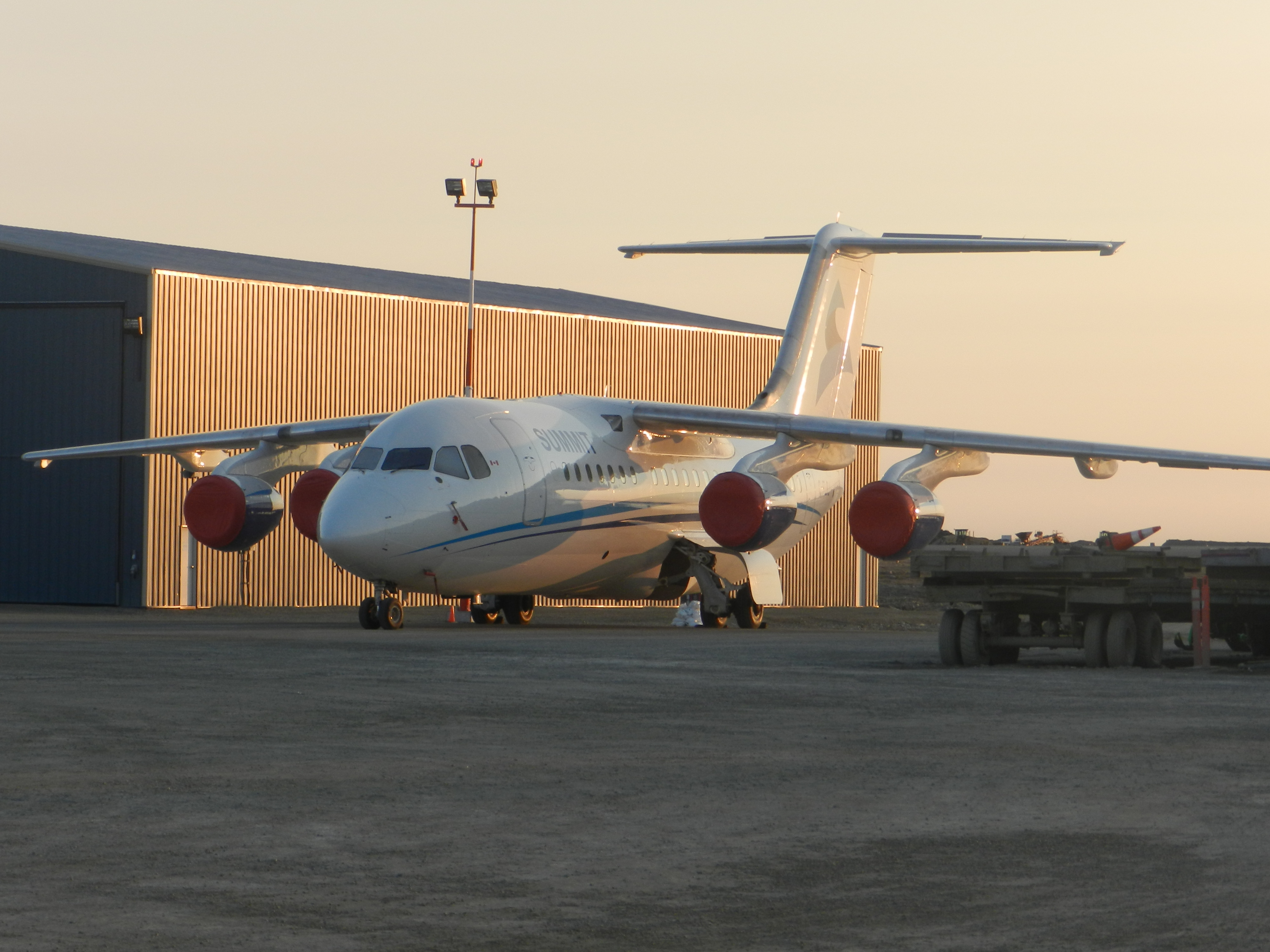
British Aerospace 146

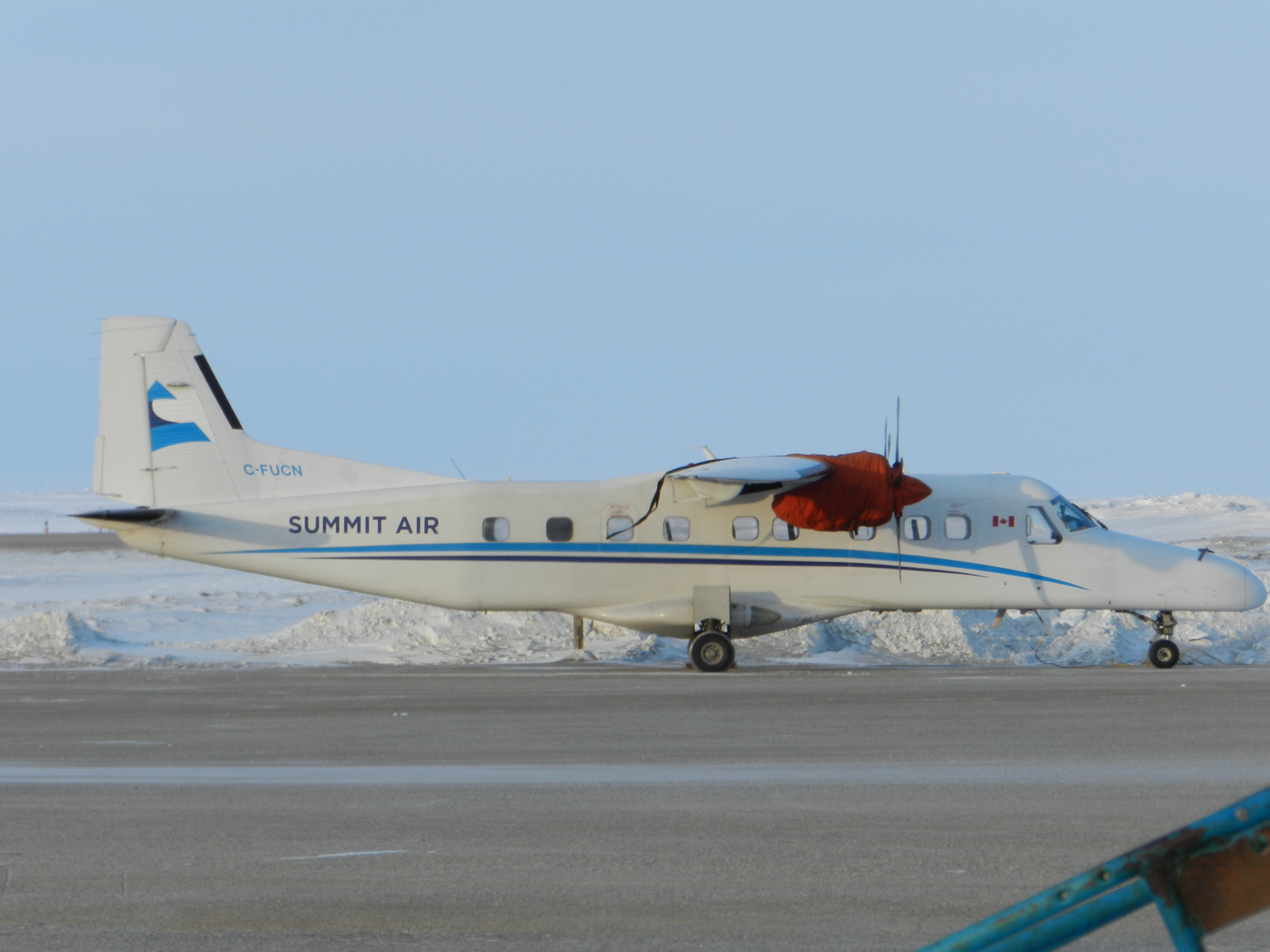
Dornier 228

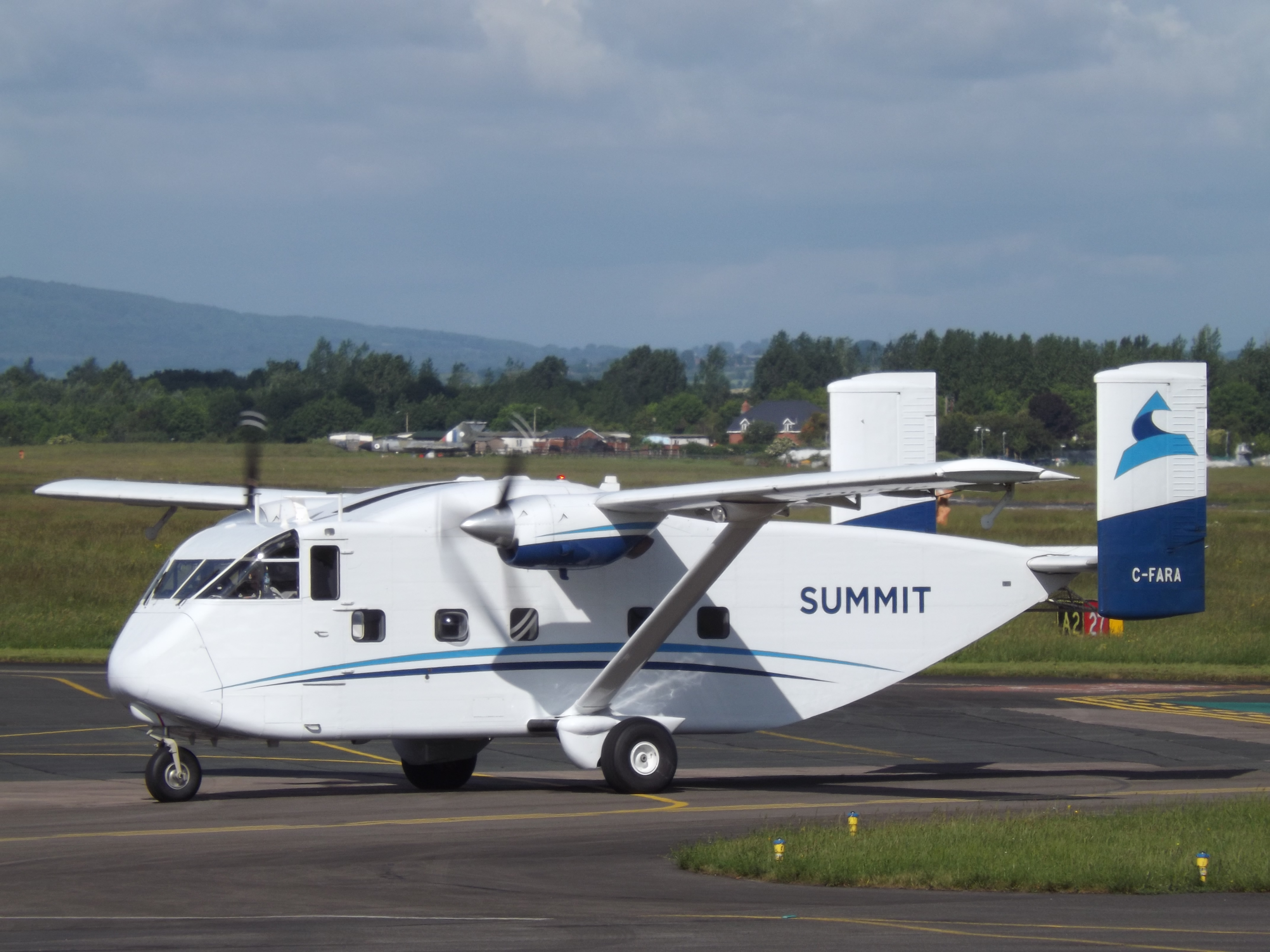
Short SC.7 Skyvan

== See also ==
- Summit Helicopters
