= Fort Smith Airport =

Public airport near Fort Smith, Northwest Territories, Canada

- IATA: YSM; ICAO: CYSM; WMO: 71934

Summary
- Airport type: Public
- Operator: Government of the Northwest Territories
- Location: Fort Smith, Northwest Territories
- Time zone: Northwest Territories Time (UTC−06:00)
- Elevation AMSL: 673 ft (205 m)
- Coordinates: 60°01′13″N 111°57′43″W

Map
- Location in the Northwest Territories

Runways
| Direction | Length | | Surface |
| Direction | ft | m | Surface |
|---|---|---|---|
| 12/30 | 6,001 | 1,829 | Asphalt |
| 03/21 | 1,797 | 548 | Gravel/asphalt |

Statistics (2010)
- Aircraft movements: 1,944
- Sources: Canada Flight Supplement; Environment Canada; Movements from Statistics Canada

Fort Smith Airport (IATA: YSM, ICAO: CYSM) is located near Fort Smith, Northwest Territories, Canada. Runway 03/21 has no winter service.

The Fort Smith (District) Heliport is located southeast of the airport.

== Airlines and destinations ==
=== Passenger ===
| Airlines | Destinations |
|---|---|
| Air Tindi | Edmonton, Fort Chipewyan, Yellowknife |

== Accidents and incidents ==
- On January 23, 2024, Northwestern Air Flight 738, a British Aerospace Jetstream operated by Northwestern Air as a charter flight to the Diavik Diamond Mine crashed shortly after takeoff, killing six people and injuring one.
