= Ledcor Group of Companies =

Construction company

- Type: Private
- Industry: Construction
- Founded: 1947
- Founder: William Lede
- Headquarters: Vancouver, British Columbia, Canada
- Number of locations: 30 offices
- Area served: Global
- Key people: Dave Lede, Chairman and CEO, Ledcor Group of Companies Ron Stevenson, President and CEO, Ledcor Industries Inc.
- Number of employees: Approximately 8,000 (as of March 2023)
- Divisions: Building, Environmental, Forestry, Heavy Civil, Infrastructure, Power, Marine, Properties, Oil and Gas, and Communications.
- Website: www.ledcor.com

Ledcor Group of Companies is a construction company operating primarily in Canada and United States. Ledcor operates in a wide range of industries, including the construction of buildings and civil infrastructure, technical services such as communication networks, forestry, mining, property development and management, transportation, marine operations, and several energy projects, including oil, gas, and Liquefied Natural Gas.

Ledcor has built several of Canada's large-scale construction projects. In 2012, construction of The Bow was completed - at the time Alberta's largest building. Ledcor also completed the construction of British Columbia's largest building, Vancouver's Shangri-La Hotel, in 2008.

Ledcor is also a founding member of the Canada Green Building Council and a longtime member of the U.S. Green Building Council. In 2014, the VanDusen Botanical Garden Visitors Centre, a Ledcor project, was named Sustainable Building of the Year by the World Architecture News.

In 2011, 2014, 2017, and 2021, Ledcor was named to Canada's 10 "Most Admired Corporate Cultures" list, securing a seat in the Hall of Fame as a four-time winner, and is consistently ranked as one of the top Canadian employers.

== History ==
William (Bill) Lede was born in 1925 to farming parents near Hay Lakes, Alberta. In 1945, he started a modest coal stripping and gravel operation with his brother-in-law, Ralph Stebner. In 1945, Bill secured a new contract with Black Nugget and officially started displaying the words "Leduc Construction" on a reconditioned Allis-Chalmers HD14. In early 1947, he became owner and president of Leduc Construction after officially incorporating the name. Their first contract was to prepare the drilling site for Imperial Oil's Leduc No. 1. In 1953, after the purchase of two Caterpillar Inc. D7 tractors, the company started to make plans for expansion and diversification.

William Lede died on September 25, 1980, when a large gravel pile collapsed upon him at a job site. Upon William's death, Dave Lede became President and Herb Lede took over as Chairman.

In 1982, Leduc Construction was renamed Ledcor, an abbreviation of Leduc Construction, and began expanding across Canada and into the United States. With that, the company diversified its construction projects into seven different sectors - building, civil, industrial, mining, pipeline, telecommunications, and highway construction.

In the 2000s, Ledcor's diversification continued, including divisions in the construction, environmental, forestry, infrastructure, mining, transportation, power, properties, oil and gas, and communications sectors. Ledcor has also acquired Summit Air Charters and Arctic Sunwest Charters which provide transport to remote areas of the Yukon, Northwest Territories, and Nunavut. They are also a part of a joint venture that owns and operates the Vancouver Harbour Flight Centre seaplane terminal. Ledcor's marine division is now one of the largest of its kind, serving southwest British Columbia with six tugboats and 13 barges.

Ledcor's electrical technicians in British Columbia voted to unionize in 2017 under the International Brotherhood of Electrical Workers, but were not recognized by the company. In 2022, the Canada Industrial Relations Board (CIRB) found that Ledcor had used unfair labor practices and had failed to engage in good faith bargaining. The CIRB then imposed a collective agreement on the parties.

== Divisions ==
The Ledcor Group of Companies operates several divisions and subsidiaries that operate in a diverse range of industries across North America.

=== Building ===
Founded in 1987, the building division of Ledcor provides full-service construction for commercial, residential, institutional, and light industrial projects. They offer specialized services in project and construction management, pre-construction services, design-build, general contracting, and Public Private Partnership (P3) delivery models for a variety of clientele. Each year, Ledcor's building division is responsible for the construction of hundreds of projects in North America.

=== Environmental ===
Ledcor has experience providing energy-efficient retrofits and wastewater treatment for clients in many sectors along with a suite of other sustainable services.

Ledcor was one of the first companies to offer green retro-fitting services to clients. Several Ledcor projects have reached Leadership in Energy and Environmental Design (LEED) accredited status. Some of Ledcor's clients have included Syncrude, Suncor, and Cadillac Fairview.

In 2014, Ledcor was the recipient of the Sustainable Building of the Year award by the World Architecture News. They were also awarded the Vancouver Regional Construction Association (VRCA) 2013 Gold Award in Sustainable Construction for the UBC Pharmaceutical Sciences building. In 2013, they won the Canadian Green Building Award for the SFU UniverCity Childcare Centre project. They also won 11 awards, including Gold, at the 24th Annual VCRA awards of Excellence gala in 2012.

=== Forestry ===
Ledcor operates a vertically-integrated supply chain that includes constructing mills, brokering logs, and processing timber into exportable wood products (cants), chips, and biofuel. They also utilize their transportation capabilities to deliver products by both land and sea.

The company is licensed to operate in the Cariboo/Chilcotin, Vanderhoof, Kamloops, and Princeton forest districts of British Columbia. The forestry division turns logging waste and residuals into biomass products that are used to produce electricity and offset the use of natural gas.

=== Infrastructure ===
Founded in 1960, Ledcor's infrastructure division undertakes both public and private infrastructure construction and maintenance projects. This includes highways, bridges, airports, and underground utilities. Ledcor offers services in all aspects of infrastructure construction including project management, procurement, design-build services, and constructability reviews.

Some of Ledcor's major projects have included the construction of the Coquihalla BC Highway 5, TransCanada Highway 1, Alberta's Highway 63, and the South Fraser Perimeter Road (SFPR) in Vancouver, British Columbia.

=== Mining ===
Since its founding in 1985, Ledcor's mining division has operated in tandem with its other divisions to cover the complete range of operations. This includes facility preparation and construction, contract mining of coal, minerals, and metals, and reclamation activities.

Ledcor has reclaimed land in a diverse range of geographic terrains and under various municipal and federal regulations. This includes erosion control, revegetation, soil and slope stabilization, topsoil reclamation, construction and closure of tailings storage facilities, demolition, equipment removal, placing soil overburden over exposed mine tailings, and regarding areas to match the contours of the surrounding terrain.

=== Transportation ===
Ledcor has subsidiaries in both the airline and marine transportation industries. Summit Air and Summit Helicopters offer both commercial flights and specialized aviation services and operate in remote regions of the Yukon, Northwest Territories, and Nunavut. Ledcor's marine fleet includes a tug and barge service that provides transportation for industrial clients in several sectors. It is one of the largest marine operations of its kind in British Columbia.

Vancouver Harbour Flight Centre is also owned and operated by Ledcor. It consists of an open facility for seaplanes servicing the Pacific Northwest's coastal communities and gives customers close access to the center of Vancouver, British Columbia.

Ledcor's transportation services are integrated with their forestry and energy services.

=== Power ===
Ledcor provides various services in the energy sector including power generation, transmission, both underground and overhead distribution, and renewables. Ledcor has contributed to the development of renewable energy forms and has constructed projects such as solar energy farms in Reno, Nevada, and wind power in Alberta.

Some of Ledcor's green energy projects include the Fitzsimmons Creek Hydroelectric Project, the Ashlu Creek Green Power Project, Barrick Solar Farm, and the Wintering Hills Wind Power Project.

=== Properties ===
Founded in 1996, Ledcor Properties now manages the development and operation of a large portfolio of commercial, residential, and light industrial real estate in North America. They have contributed to over 60 projects with a value exceeding $2.5 billion.

=== Oil and Gas ===
The oil industry was one of the first that Ledcor began operating in. They now participate in a range of activities including earthworks, foundations, construction, maintenance, pipe fabrication, and module assembly. Since the 1940s, Ledcor has constructed some of North America's largest resource projects, often in challenging locations including the Arctic and offshore. Pipeline construction is a major part of the oil and gas division.

Ledcor's clients have included TransCanada, Suncor, Imperial Oil, Shell, Syncrude, Apache, Encana, and Nova. They are also active in the oil and gas research and development field, having invested heavily in the Northern Alberta Institute of Technology (NAIT) and are a founding partner for the Pipeline Integrity Institute (PII) at UBC.

=== Communications ===
In operation since 1979, Ledcor Technical Services designs build and maintains both wired and wireless networks across North America. This division is responsible for building the first coast-to-coast fiber optic cable in Canada and installing the first undersea cable in the United States.

Some of Ledcor's communications clients have included Fonorola Inc, Bell Canada, Telus, Suncor, and CNRL.

== Safety ==
Ledcor has received several major awards for achieving a high performance in safety. In 2014, this included the Construction Owners Association of Alberta's Safety Leadership Award and Imperial Oil/Exxon Mobil's Exemplary Safety Performance Award. In 2012, Ledcor won the Chevron Product Company Safety Excellence Award and in 2010 won the Shell Goal Zero Award for reaching 365 days without medical aid on the Shell Albian Sands Expansion project.

== Community impact ==
Over the past 10 years, Ledcor and its employees have invested over $24.1 million in more than 150 charities across North America, as well as supporting communities through various professional development, sustainability, research, and initiatives.

Ledcor has been a consistent supporter of children's charities including BC Children's Hospital, Kids Help Phone, and Ronald McDonald House.

Each year, Ledcor's annual employee campaign provides funding for pediatric hospitals, Make-A-Wish Foundation, United Way chapters, and other local charities focused on children's health.

Ledcor's community investment also includes industry, apprenticeship, and scholarship programs that aim to teach skills and give experience to individuals. Some of the major organizations they support include the Northern Alberta Institute of Technology (NAIT), the University of Alberta, Junior Achievement BC, and Junior Achievement Northern Alberta.

Ledcor has built partnerships and pursued opportunities with several Aboriginal communities including the Haisla Nation, McLeod Lake Indian Band, Squamish Nation and Lil-wat First Nation, West Moberly First Nations, Fort Nelson First Nation, Tsawwassen First Nation, and the Tahltan Nation.
