= Fort Chipewyan =

- Hamlet / designated place
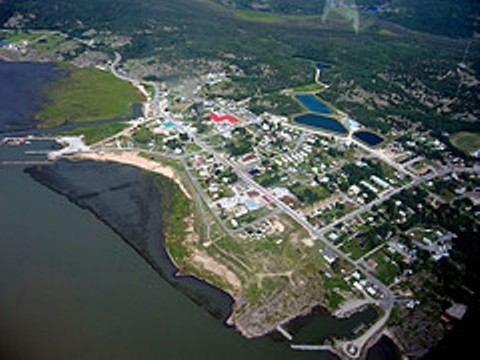
- Aerial view of Fort Chipewyan

- Location of Fort Chipewyan
- Coordinates: 58°42′52″N 111°09′30″W
- Country: Canada
- Province: Alberta
- Region: Northern Alberta
- Census division: 16
- Specialized municipality: RM of Wood Buffalo
- Settled: 1788

Government
  - Type: Unincorporated
  - Mayor: Sandy Bowman
  - Governing body: Wood Buffalo Municipal Council: Mike Allen; Ty Brandt; Lance Bussieres; Luana Bussieres; Don Scott; Jennifer Vardy; Kendrick Cardinal; Greg "Cowboy" Marcel; Stu Wigle; Kyle Vandecasteyen

Area
  - Land: 9.93 km^{2} (3.83 sq mi)
- Elevation: 221 m (725 ft)

Population (2021)
  - Total: 798
  - Density: 80.4/km^{2} (208/sq mi)
- Time zone: UTC−06:00 (Alberta Time)
- Postal code: T0P 1B0
- Area code: +1-780
- Climate: Dfc

Fort Chipewyan /ˈtʃɪpəwaɪən, -pwaɪ-, ˈtʃɪpəwən/, commonly referred to as Fort Chip, is an unincorporated hamlet in northern Alberta, Canada, within the Regional Municipality (RM) of Wood Buffalo. It is located on the northwest shore of Lake Athabasca, which flows into the Slave River, thence to the Mackenzie River and the Arctic Ocean. First built as fur trading post in the late 1700s, Fort Chipewyan is one of the oldest European settlements in the Province of Alberta.

== History ==
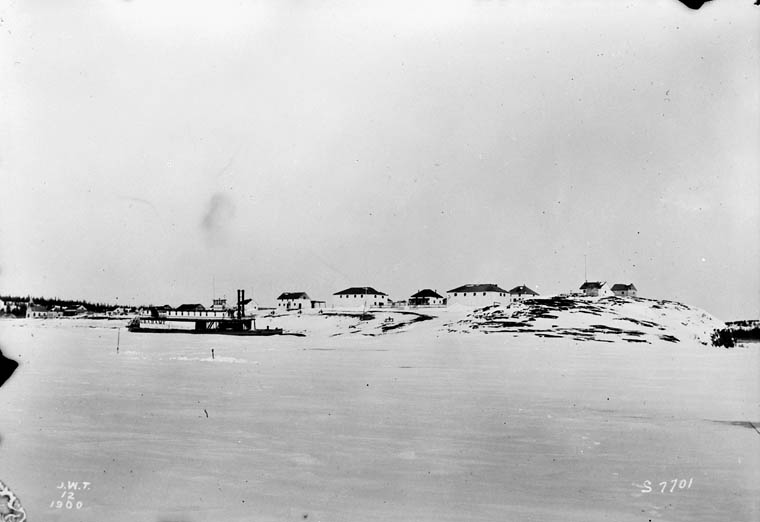
Fort Chipewyan 1900 and SS Grahame

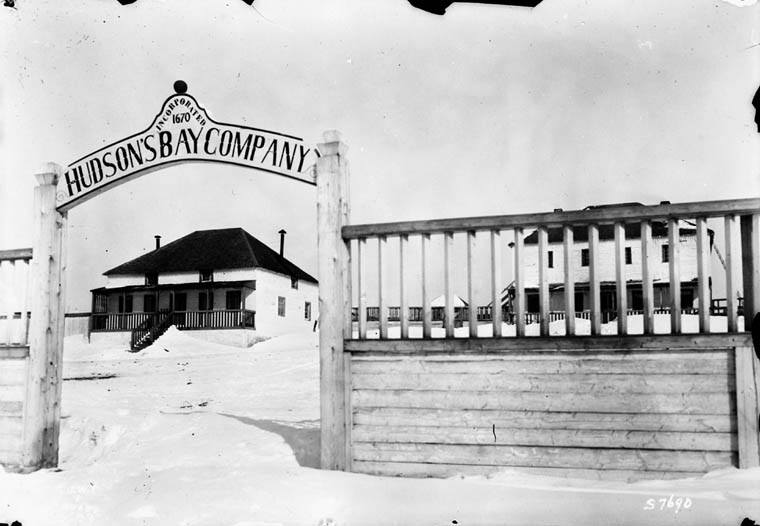
Fort Chipewyan HBC post in 1900

Fort Chipewyan is one of the oldest European settlements in the Province of Alberta. It was one of Canada's important fur trading posts in the late 1700s and early 1800s, serving as a distribution and collection point for furs, goods and men trading in the Peace, Slave, Athabasca and Mackenzie river basins. It was established as a trading post of the North West Company in 1788. It is named after the Chipewyan living in the area. Its original location was Old Fort Point, on the southwest shore of Lake Athabasca, west of the Old Fort River. The first fur trading post in the area was the NWC's Pond House, or Pond's Fort on the Athabasca River, about 48 to 64 km (30 to 40 mi) from its mouth, established in 1778. Fort Chipewyan on the shore of Lake Athabasca was founded in 1788. It was built on a prominent peninsula, now known as Old Fort Point, on the south shore of Lake Athabasca, about 9 km (5.6 mi) to the east of the Athabasca River delta.

Alexander Mackenzie set out from Fort Chipewyan on his expeditions down the Mackenzie River and to the west coast.

One of the founders of Fort Chipweyan in 1788, Roderick Mackenzie of Terrebonne served as its administrator until 1794. He had a taste for the written word. He opened correspondence with traders all over the north and west, asking for descriptions of scenery, adventure, folklore and history. He also founded a library at the fort that served the residents of Fort Chipewyan, as well as traders and clerks of the whole Lake Athabasca region. He hoped it would be what he called, in an imaginative and somewhat jocular vein, "the little Athens of the Arctic regions." This library, started in 1790, held more than 2000 books. It became one of the most famous in the whole extent of Rupert's Land.

In 1798, the NWC's Fort Chipewyan was relocated to a site on the north shore, the site of today's hamlet. A new post, now known as Fort Chipewyan III, was built in 1803, not far away.

In 1802, the Hudson's Bay Company (HBC) set up a post, Nottingham House, on English Island at the mouth of Slave River, the outlet of Lake Athabasca. It was abandoned in 1806. From about 1815 to 1821 the HBC operated a competing Fort Wedderburn (named after Andrew Colvile's family) on Coal or Potato Island 2.4 km (1 1/2 mi) from the North West Company's fort. This fort was established by John Clarke. Sir George Simpson stayed here 1820–1821, during which time he reorganized the fur trade. When the HBC and NWC merged in 1821, Fort Wedderburn was abandoned and all HBC's fur-trade operations on the lake moved to Fort Chipewyan.

Sir John Franklin used Fort Chipewyan as a way-station on his overland Arctic Coppermine expedition in July 1820.

In 1887–1888 there was a great famine in the Fort Chipewyan area.

Electricity and electric lights arrived in Fort Chipewyan in 1959.

In 2023 about a thousand people were evacuated from the centre due to threat by a wildfire.

=== Historic sites ===
Old Fort Point, the site of the first Fort Chipewyan, established in 1788 southeast of the present site of Fort Chipewyan, was designated a National Historic Site of Canada in 1930.

Historic places in the community include the site of the third Fort Chipewyan, established in 1803, the Anglican Church built in 1880 and Day School built in 1874, and the Roman Catholic Mission Church built in 1909.

== Geography ==
It is located on the western tip of Lake Athabasca, adjacent to Wood Buffalo National Park, approximately 223 km (139 mi) north of Fort McMurray.

=== Climate ===
Fort Chipewyan has a subarctic climate (Köppen Dfc) with long, very cold, dry winters and short, warm, wetter summers. The highest temperature ever recorded in Fort Chipewyan was 39.3 °C (102.7 °F) on 30 June 2021. The coldest temperature ever recorded was −51.1 °C (−60 °F) on 1 February 1917.

Climate data for Fort Chipewyan (Fort Chipewyan Airport) Climate ID: 3072658; coordinates 58°46′N 111°07′W; elevation: 232.0 m (761.2 ft); 1981–2010 normals, extremes 1883–present (Note: Climate data was recorded at Fort Chipewyan from October 1883 to October 1967 and at Fort Chipewyan Airport from November 1967 to present.)
Month	Jan	Feb	Mar	Apr	May	Jun	Jul	Aug	Sep	Oct	Nov	Dec	Year
Record high humidex	7.3	10.6	15.0	26.4	32.4	38.3	37.7	40.6	32.1	26.0	14.1	8.4	40.6
Record high °C (°F)	10.5 (50.9)	11.0 (51.8)	15.5 (59.9)	27.1 (80.8)	32.4 (90.3)	39.3 (102.7)	36.1 (97.0)	34.1 (93.4)	31.2 (88.2)	26.5 (79.7)	14.4 (57.9)	8.8 (47.8)	39.3 (102.7)
Mean daily maximum °C (°F)	−15.8 (3.6)	−12.3 (9.9)	−4.8 (23.4)	5.4 (41.7)	14.5 (58.1)	21.0 (69.8)	23.4 (74.1)	21.3 (70.3)	14.6 (58.3)	5.2 (41.4)	−5.7 (21.7)	−13.1 (8.4)	4.5 (40.1)
Daily mean °C (°F)	−21.0 (−5.8)	−18.4 (−1.1)	−11.7 (10.9)	−0.9 (30.4)	7.9 (46.2)	14.5 (58.1)	17.2 (63.0)	15.2 (59.4)	9.0 (48.2)	1.0 (33.8)	−10.0 (14.0)	−17.9 (−0.2)	−1.3 (29.7)
Mean daily minimum °C (°F)	−26.2 (−15.2)	−24.5 (−12.1)	−18.5 (−1.3)	−7.3 (18.9)	1.2 (34.2)	8.1 (46.6)	10.9 (51.6)	9.1 (48.4)	3.4 (38.1)	−3.2 (26.2)	−14.2 (6.4)	−22.8 (−9.0)	−7.0 (19.4)
Record low °C (°F)	−50.0 (−58.0)	−51.2 (−60.2)	−43.8 (−46.8)	−34.1 (−29.4)	−21.8 (−7.2)	−7.0 (19.4)	−0.9 (30.4)	−4.2 (24.4)	−12.2 (10.0)	−30.0 (−22.0)	−39.8 (−39.6)	−47.8 (−54.0)	−51.2 (−60.2)
Record low wind chill	−57.6	−58.6	−52.4	−41.0	−25.3	−6.7	0.0	−6.2	−16.5	−33.1	−47.1	−59.1	−59.1
Average precipitation mm (inches)	18.1 (0.71)	16.6 (0.65)	17.8 (0.70)	12.8 (0.50)	26.5 (1.04)	42.8 (1.69)	64.0 (2.52)	57.7 (2.27)	51.0 (2.01)	25.8 (1.02)	17.9 (0.70)	20.1 (0.79)	370.9 (14.60)
Average rainfall mm (inches)	0.2 (0.01)	0.0 (0.0)	0.2 (0.01)	—	23.8 (0.94)	42.7 (1.68)	—	54.6 (2.15)	51.8 (2.04)	—	—	—	—
Average snowfall cm (inches)	12.4 (4.9)	14.2 (5.6)	14.9 (5.9)	—	2.4 (0.9)	0.0 (0.0)	0.0 (0.0)	0.0 (0.0)	0.7 (0.3)	—	—	—	—
Average precipitation days (≥ 0.2 mm)	12.9	12.1	12.3	7.5	11.3	13.5	14.2	13.9	13.8	12.5	13.9	14.3	152.1
Average rainy days (≥ 0.2 mm)	0.2	0.1	0.3	—	10.3	12.1	—	12.9	13.3	—	—	—	—
Average snowy days (≥ 0.2 cm)	10.3	9.9	9.6	—	1.4	0.1	0.0	0.0	0.4	—	—	—	—
Average relative humidity (%) (at 1500 LST)	73.4	66.1	54.7	47.0	42.8	46.3	50.8	55.3	59.4	67.5	78.9	77.1	59.9
Source: Environment and Climate Change Canada (February minimum) (June maximum) (July maximum)

== Demographics ==
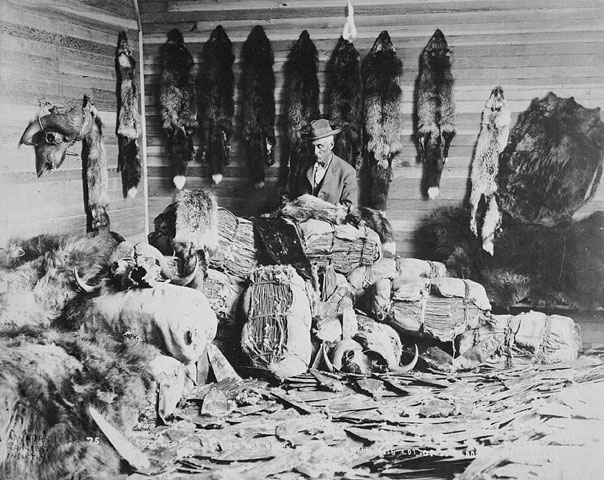
Fort Chipewyan fur trader 1890s with $35,000 worth of furs

Population history of Fort Chipewyan

Year	Pop.	±%
1941	441	—
1951	466	+5.7%
1956	304	−34.8%
1961	717	+135.9%
1966	1,026	+43.1%
1971	1,122	+9.4%
1976	1,179	+5.1%
1981	944	−19.9%
1986	922	−2.3%

Year	Pop.	±%
1991	537	−41.8%
1991A	1,004	+87.0%
1996	935	−6.9%
2001	902	−3.5%
2006	756	−16.2%
2011	847	+12.0%
2016	852	+0.6%
2021	798	−6.3%

Source: Statistics Canada

In the 2021 Census of Population conducted by Statistics Canada, Fort Chipewyan had a population of 798 living in 309 of its 387 total private dwellings, a change of −6.3% from its 2016 population of 852. With a land area of 9.93 km^{2} (3.83 sq mi), it had a population density of 80.4/km^{2} (208.1/sq mi) in 2021.

The population of Fort Chipewyan according to the 2018 municipal census conducted by the Regional Municipality of Wood Buffalo is 918, a decrease from its 2012 municipal census population count of 1,008.

As a designated place in the 2016 Census of Population conducted by Statistics Canada, Fort Chipewyan had a population of 852 living in 295 of its 372 total private dwellings, a change of 0.6% from its 2011 population of 847. With a land area of 10.7 km^{2} (4.1 sq mi), it had a population density of 79.6/km^{2} (206.2/sq mi) in 2016.

The hamlet's population is predominantly made up of Cree and Chipewyan (Dene) First Nations and Métis.

== Transportation ==
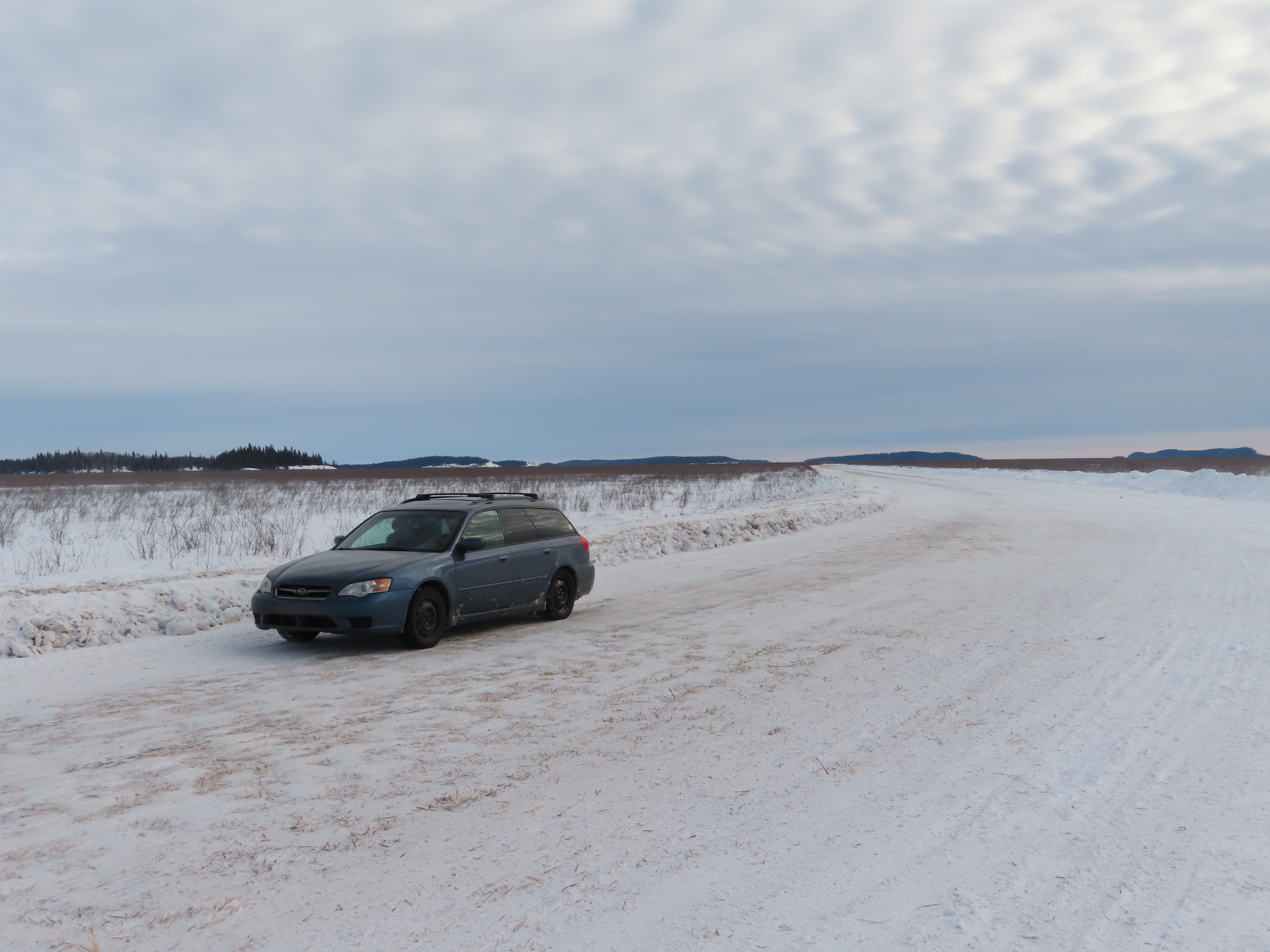
The Fort Chipewyan Winter Road traverses the Peace-Athabasca Delta

=== Air ===
The hamlet is served by the Fort Chipewyan Airport, opened on June 18, 1966. Air is one of two methods of access to Fort Chipewyan in the summer.

=== Water ===
In the summer, the hamlet also can be accessed by boat from Fort McMurray via the Athabasca River.

=== Road ===
There are no all-weather roads to Fort Chipewyan, but it can be reached via winter roads in the winter. These include roads from Fort Smith to the north and from Fort McMurray to the south. In June 1998, and as part of the Northwestern Canadian Integrated Road Network Plan, the Alberta government conducted studies on all-weather road access by extending the existing Highway 63 from Fort McMurray. As of 2008 Highway 63 has been extended from Fort McMurray to Syncrude; there are currently no plans on extending it further to Fort Chipewyan. In December 2005, one-third of Fort Chipewyan's residents signed a petition to request the government to build a 50 km (31 mi) all-weather road to connect with existing roads to the northwest that provide access to Fort Smith, Northwest Territories. The major expenditure would be a bridge over the Slave River.

== Solar energy ==
In September 2014, the community of Fort Chipewyan in collaboration with Keepers of the Athabasca installed a 1.8 kW solar array on the roof of the Elder Lodge to be used for emergency backup power. An energy baseline study was completed for Fort Chipewyan by the Pembina Institute in 2012.

The table below shows the mean daily global insolation (kWh/m^{2}) in Fort Chipewyan for each month of the year using five different fixed solar array orientations and one which tracks the sun. The data was provided by Natural Resources Canada's Municipality database of photovoltaic potential and insolation which used data collected over 50 years from 144 locations compiled from Environment Canada's CERES CD.

Mean daily global insolation (kWh/m^{2}) in Fort Chipewyan
Month	South facing (tilt = vertical)	South facing (tilt = latitude)	South facing (tilt = lat+15^{o}	South facing (tilt = lat-15^{o}	Two-axis sun-tracking	Horizontal (tilt=0^{o})
January	2.64	2.46	2.63	2.14	2.86	0.56
February	4.23	4.17	4.33	3.77	5.02	1.42
March	5.48	5.92	5.88	5.65	7.74	3.02
April	4.95	6.26	5.78	6.41	9.38	4.71
May	3.82	5.55	4.84	6.02	9.59	5.82
June	3.38	5.2	4.43	5.78	9.76	6.23
July	3.38	5.09	4.37	5.61	9.26	5.82
August	3.66	5.04	4.51	5.34	8.19	4.5
September	3.35	4.04	3.82	4.03	5.56	2.8
October	2.68	2.85	2.86	2.69	3.51	1.49
November	2.16	2.07	2.18	1.84	2.42	0.65
December	1.98	1.82	1.96	1.56	2.09	0.34
Annual	3.47	4.2	3.96	4.24	6.29	3.12

=== Fort Chipewyan Solar Farm ===
The Fort Chipewyan Solar Farm was developed by Three Nations Energy LP, and constructed in 2019 through 2020. ATCO was the designer and builder, and operates the system. The Athabasca Chipewyan First Nation, Mikisew Cree First Nation, and Fort Chipewyan Métis Local 125 own the project. The solar farm is expected to supply approximately 25 percent of Fort Chipewyan's energy and annually replace 800,000 litres of diesel fuel. A battery storage system will store 1.5 MWh of power.

Phase 1 was planned to include 1,500 panels (400 kW) but was reported at the project completion as a 600 kW facility, while phase 2 was planned include 6,000 panels and was reported at the project completion to include 5,760 panels with the planned output of 2,200 kW. The Government of Canada provided $4.5M and the Government of Alberta provided $3.3M of the project's $7.8M cost.

ATCO will buy the solar farm's energy under a long-term purchase agreement and supply it to the local power grid, which is disconnected from the province-wide grid. ATCO stated that with the completion of the 2.2 MW-capacity project, about 25 fewer tanker trucks will trek across the winter ice road connecting the community with Fort McMurray, 220 km (140 mi) to the south. In the summer, the community is only accessible by air or barge.

== See also ==
- List of communities in Alberta
- List of designated places in Alberta
- List of hamlets in Alberta
