= Stanton Territorial Hospital =

Hospital in Yellowknife, Northwest Territories, Canada

- Northwest Territories Health and Social Services Authority
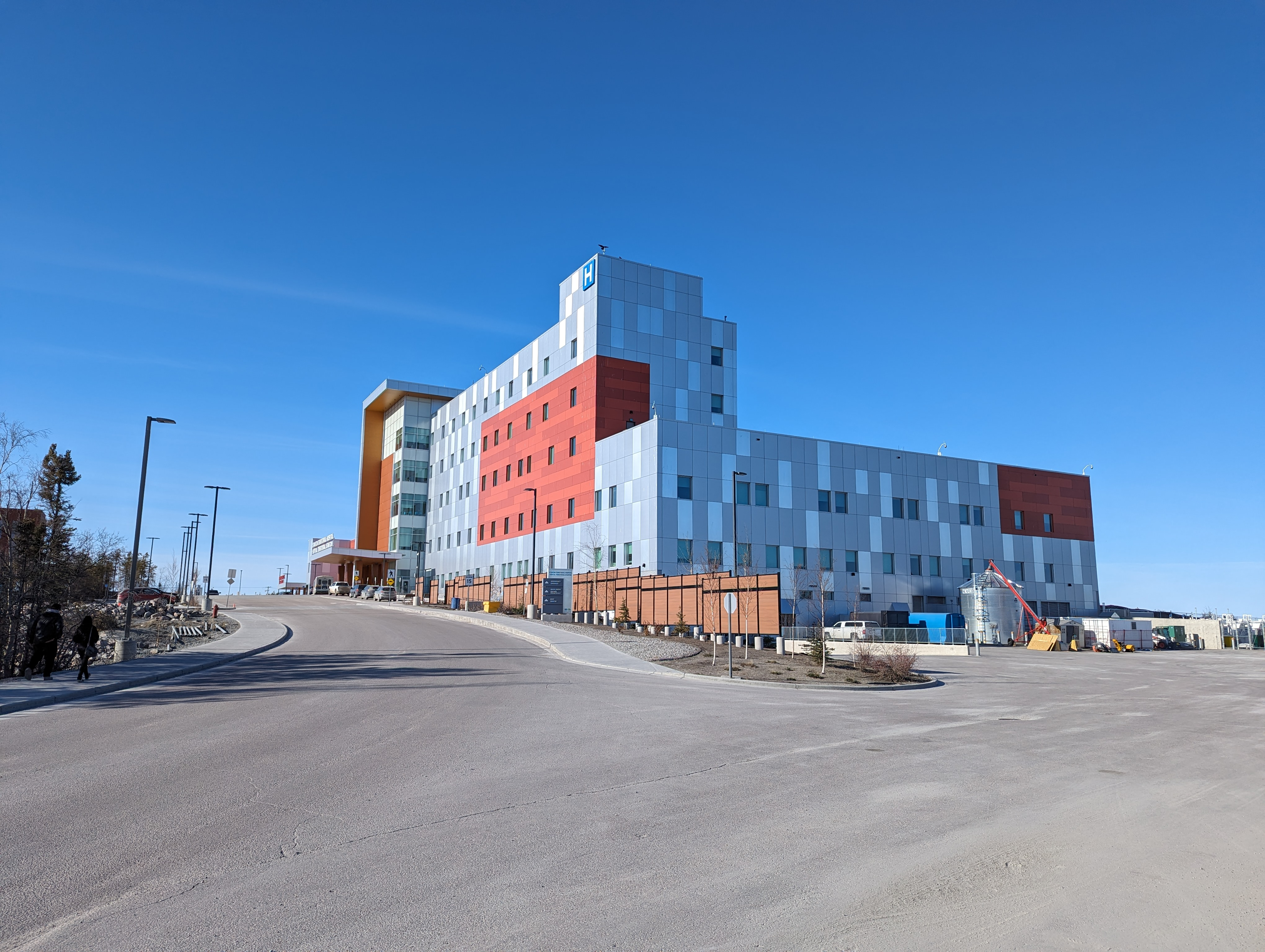

Geography
- Location: 548 Byrne Rd, Northwest Territories, Canada
- Coordinates: 62.4479°N 114.4024°W

Organization
- Care system: Medicare (Canada)
- Type: General

Services
- Emergency department: Yes
- Beds: 100

Helipads
- Helipad: No, demolished 2016

History
- Former name: Stanton Yellowknife Hospital
- Opened: 1967

Links
- Website: www.nthssa.ca/en/stanton-territorial-hospital
- Lists: Hospitals in Canada

Stanton Territorial Hospital, formerly Stanton Yellowknife Hospital, is a hospital located in Yellowknife, Northwest Territories, Canada. The current 100-bed hospital building opened in 2019, the largest hospital in the territory, and is under the jurisdiction of the Northwest Territories Health and Social Services Authority. The hospital provides 24/7 emergency care along with extended care, obstetrics, surgery (with three operating theatres), psychiatry, pediatrics, and a 6-bed intensive care unit. Outpatient services include numerous specialties.

== Notable staff ==
- Courtney Howard

== Naming ==
Stanton Territorial Hospital is named after Dr. Oliver L. Stanton for his contributions to medicine in the city and the territory more widely. Dr. Stanton was the first doctor in Yellowknife after being brought to the city in 1937 to run a four-bed company hospital, which was located in a cottage near the Con mine gold camp for Cominco Mine. The first Yellowknife hospital was built in Yellowknife with his assistance. The first building to bear his name was the Yellowknife Stanton Hospital located on 50th Avenue.

== History ==
In 1988, a brand new Stanton Territorial Hospital was opened, with 100-bed capacity in a ward-based configuration and acute care capability matching the current hospital completed in 2019. Throughout the three decades it was operational, bed capacity was reduced to 80 beds due to changing needs and renovations converting ward space into semi-private rooms for enhanced patient comfort.

Upon the 2015 announcement of a new 100-bed facility to replace the building constructed in 1988, it was revealed the name of the current hospital (a legacy that had continued since the first medical building in the city) would continue on to the new building.

The old Stanton Territorial Hospital (1988–2019) was temporarily given a placeholder name of "Legacy Stanton" by the Government of the Northwest Territories (GNWT), and was often referred to by locals as the "old Stanton".

On the evening of May 25, 2019 signs notifying the impending transfer of emergency care were posted, the cover was removed from the new Stanton Territorial Hospital, and the blue "H" on the top floor of the building was illuminated. On May 26, 2019 all patients of the former hospital were transferred and the emergency room of the new building began operations at 6:00 am local time.

=== Legacy Stanton Territorial Hospital ===
On October 13, 2023 the legacy Stanton building was officially renamed to the Łıwegǫ̀atì building (formerly known by the placeholder project name of Legacy Stanton) after a months-long naming process that received 150 submissions. Currently houses long-term care patients, and will house extended care, long-term care, a primary care clinic, and rehabilitation services including physiotherapy and occupational therapy upon its complete re-opening, planned for May of 2024. It is one of three buildings on the health campus, and is located between Stanton Territorial Hospital and the Stanton Medical Clinic.

== Construction ==
The new Stanton Territorial Hospital was announced on September 25, 2015 via a contract awarded to Boreal Health Partnership for a new hospital building and was first published by CBC News. Originally the legacy Stanton building (opened in 1988) was designed with expansion in mind, but due to complexities of keeping the hospital operational during a proposed expansion and the need for renovations, it was decided to build an entirely new building to replace it.

The construction of the new Stanton Territorial Hospital commenced on October 8, 2015 with a groundbreaking ceremony. The construction was a Public-Private Partnership (P3) between the GNWT and Boreal Health Partnership – a consortium of Bird Construction and Clark Builders Ltd for construction, Kasian Architects for design, and construction and facilities management firm Carillion Canada Inc. as a services provider and financial backer, as well as several secondary firms. The project's construction was the largest and most expensive undertaken by the GNWT to date at an initial up-front cost of $350 million CAD and additional $18 million per year for 30 years after the hospital is opened, at which point the government takes complete ownership of the building.

Carillion Canada held 50% equity shares in the Stanton project and had a 30-year facility maintenance contract that was set to start once the hospital became operational. Less than 3 years after construction commenced, Carillion Canada's parent company Carillion plc of the UK entered liquidation after ceasing operation on January 15, 2018. Boreal Health Partnership remained liable for the operational obligations, and when Carillion Canada's support services division was purchased by Fairfax Financial Holdings in March 2018, the maintenance contract was retained by the company, which became Dexterra Group Inc.

Construction of the new Stanton Hospital building was completed in May of 2018, and all patients were transferred to the new building on May 26, 2019, the same day it operationally opened.

On July 12, 2019 the new Stanton Territorial Hospital officially opened with an opening ceremony. Dexterra was announced as the Facility Manager for the 30-year contract in a government press release the same day. The role includes cleaning and catering for the cafeteria.

=== Features ===
The new Stanton Territorial Hospital building is 27,500 m² - over twice the footprint of the previous structure - and stands 31 metres tall.

A list of features as mentioned on a GNWT Quick Facts handout:

- "A significant expansion of Emergency Department, Ambulatory Care Centre and Intensive Care Unit;
- Operating rooms that are double the size and equipped with surgical booms;
- A secure outdoor space for mental health patients;
- A designated multi-denominational Sacred Space for spiritual ceremonies;
- An expanded cafeteria featuring northern artwork and a living wall;
- System upgrades including a pneumatic tube system, patient lifts, surgical booms, nurse call, integrated beside terminals and wi-fi;
- Therapeutic gardens complete with a ceremonial fire pit, playground and natural flora and fauna;
- Pellet boilers for an energy-efficient design;
- Dedicated elevators for patients and staff separate from public, to protect privacy;
- 375 free parking stalls for staff and public."

It is the largest health facility - and the largest capital project - ever undertaken by the territory.

== Parking ==
Stanton Territorial Hospital has 375 free parking stalls in a single, central lot for use by both staff and the general public. The lot is also used by the adjacent Łıwegǫ̀atì building.
