= List of airports in Canada (T–Z) =

This is an list of all Nav Canada certified and registered water and land airports, aerodromes and heliports in the provinces and territories of Canada. The list is sorted alphabetically as shown in the Canada Flight Supplement (and the name as used by the airport if different) and airports names in italics are part of the National Airports System.

They are listed in the format:

- Airport name as listed by either the Canada Flight Supplement (CFS) or the airport authority, alternate name, International Civil Aviation Organization (ICAO) code, Transport Canada Location identifier (TC LID) International Air Transport Association (IATA) code, community and province.

== T ==
Airport name	ICAO	TC LID	IATA	Community	Province or territory
Taber Airport		CED5		Taber	Alberta
Taber (Health Centre) Heliport		CTB7		Taber	Alberta
Tadoule Lake Airport	CYBQ		XTL	Tadoule Lake	Manitoba
Tahsis Water Aerodrome		CAL9		Tahsis	British Columbia
Takla Landing Water Aerodrome		CAZ3		Takla Landing	British Columbia
Taloyoak Airport	CYYH		YYH	Taloyoak	Nunavut
Taltheilei Narrows Airport		CFA7		Great Slave Lake	Northwest Territories
Taltheilei Narrows Water Aerodrome		CED9		Great Slave Lake	Northwest Territories
Taltson River Airport		CFW5		Taltson River	Northwest Territories
Tanquary Fiord Airport		CJQ6	JQ6	Tanquary Fiord	Nunavut
Tasiujaq Airport	CYTQ		YTQ	Tasiujaq	Quebec
Teepee Airport		CFM6		Teepee	Alberta
Teeswater (Dent Field) Aerodrome		CDF2		Teeswater	Ontario
Teeswater (Thompson Field) Airport		CPC6		Teeswater	Ontario
Telegraph Creek Water Aerodrome		CAH9	YXT	Telegraph Creek	British Columbia
Temagami/Mine Landing Water Aerodrome		CTM2		Temagami	Ontario
Temagami Water Aerodrome		CNC8		Temagami	Ontario
Témiscouata-sur-le-Lac Water Aerodrome		CTM8		Témiscouata-sur-le-Lac	Quebec
Terrace Airport (Northwest Regional Airport Terrace-Kitimat)	CYXT		YGB	Terrace / Kitimat	British Columbia
Teslin Airport	CYZW		YZW	Teslin	Yukon
Tête-à-la-Baleine Airport		CTB6	ZTB	Tête-à-la-Baleine	Quebec
Texada/Gillies Bay Airport	CYGB			Texada Island	British Columbia
The Pas Airport	CYQD		YQD	The Pas	Manitoba
The Pas/Grace Lake Airport		CJR3		The Pas	Manitoba
Thetford Mines Airport		CSM3		Thetford Mines	Quebec
Thetford Mines/Lac Bécancour Water Aerodrome		CLB4		Thetford Mines (Lac Bécancour)	Quebec
Thicket Portage Airport	CZLQ		YTD	Thicket Portage	Manitoba
Thompson Airport	CYTH		YTH	Thompson	Manitoba
Thompson Heliport		CKM7		Thompson	Manitoba
Thompson Water Aerodrome		CKD6		Thompson	Manitoba
Thorburn Airport		CCZ5		Thorburn	Nova Scotia
Thorburn Lake Water Aerodrome		CCW5		Thorburn Lake	Newfoundland and Labrador
Thornbury/Fossil Beach (Blue Mountain) Heliport		CFB9		Thornbury	Ontario
Three Hills Airport		CEN3		Three Hills	Alberta
Three Hills (Hospital) Heliport		CFA8		Three Hills	Alberta
Thunder Bay/Eldorado Aerodrome		CED8		Thunder Bay	Ontario
Thunder Bay (Health Science Centre) Heliport		CTB2		Thunder Bay	Ontario
Thunder Bay International Airport	CYQT		YQT	Thunder Bay	Ontario
Thunder Bay (Martin's Landing) Aerodrome		CML5		Thunder Bay	Ontario
Thunder Bay/Two Island Lake Water Aerodrome		CTI2		Thunder Bay	Ontario
Thunder Bay Water Aerodrome		CKE6		Thunder Bay	Ontario
Tillsonburg Airport	CYTB			Tillsonburg	Ontario
Timmins (Timmins & District Hospital) Heliport		CTM6		Timmins	Ontario
Timmins Victor M. Power Airport	CYTS		YTS	Timmins	Ontario
Tincup Lake Water Aerodrome		CEF9		Tincup Wilderness Lodge	Yukon
Tisdale Airport		CJY3	YTT	Tisdale	Saskatchewan
Toad River/Mile 422 (Alaska Highway) Airport		CBK7		Toad River	British Columbia
Tobermory Airport		CNR4		Tobermory	Ontario
Tofield Airport		CEV7		Tofield	Alberta
Tofield (Health Centre) Heliport		CTF2		Tofield	Alberta
Tofino (General Hospital) Heliport		CBC8		Tofino	British Columbia
Tofino Harbour Water Aerodrome		CAB4		Tofino Harbour	British Columbia
Tofino Lifeboat Station Heliport		CBR7	YAZ	Tofino	British Columbia
Tofino-Long Beach Airport	CYAZ			Tofino	British Columbia
Toronto/Billy Bishop Toronto City Airport (Billy Bishop Toronto City Airport, Toronto Island Airport)	CYTZ		YTZ	Toronto	Ontario
Toronto/Chartright Polson Pier Heliport		CPP4		Toronto	Ontario
Toronto (Hospital For Sick Children) Heliport		CNW8		Toronto	Ontario
Toronto Island Airport (Billy Bishop Toronto City Airport, Toronto/Billy Bishop Toronto City Airport)	CYTZ		YTZ	Toronto	Ontario
Toronto/Markham Airport (Markham Airport)		CNU8		Markham	Ontario
Toronto/Markham Stouffville Heliport		CPH7		Toronto	Ontario
Toronto (Mississauga Credit Valley Hospital) Heliport		CPK6		Toronto	Ontario
Toronto/Oshawa Executive Airport (Oshawa Executive Airport)	CYOO		YOO	Oshawa	Ontario
Toronto Pearson International Airport	CYYZ		YYZ	Toronto	Ontario
Toronto (St. Michael's Hospital) Heliport		CTM4		Toronto	Ontario
Toronto (Sunnybrook Health Science Centre) Heliport		CNY8		Toronto	Ontario
Toronto/Tarten Heliport		CPA5		Toronto	Ontario
Toronto/Wilson's Heliport		CPY5		Toronto	Ontario
Torrence/Walkers Point Aerodrome		CWP5		Torrance	Ontario
Tottenham/Mardon Aerodrome		CMA6		Tottenham	Ontario
Tottenham/Ronan Aerodrome		CTR3		Tottenham	Ontario
Tottenham/Volk Airport		CPM5		Tottenham	Ontario
Trail Airport		CAD4		Trail	British Columbia
Trail (Kootenay Boundary Regional Hospital) Heliport		CKB3		Trail	British Columbia
Treherne Airport		CKU2		Treherne	Manitoba
Treherne (South Norfolk Airpark) Aerodrome		CTN6		Treherne	Manitoba
Trenton Aerodrome	CYTN			Trenton	Nova Scotia
Trenton Airport (CFB Trenton)	CYTR		YTR	Trenton	Ontario
Trenton/Mountain View Airport (CFD Mountain View)		CPZ3		Mountain View	Ontario
Trois-Rivières Airport	CYRQ		YRQ	Trois-Rivières	Quebec
Trout Lake Aerodrome		CFB4		Trout Lake	Alberta
Truro (Colchester Health Centre) Heliport		CEH9		Truro	Nova Scotia
Tsay Keh Airport		CBN9		Tsay Keh	British Columbia
Tsetzi Lake (Pan Phillips) Airport		CBT3		Tsetzi Lake	British Columbia
Tsuniah Lake Lodge Airport		CAF4		Tsuniah Lake Lodge	British Columbia
Tuktoyaktuk/James Gruben Airport	CYUB		YUB	Tuktoyaktuk	Northwest Territories
Tulita Airport	CZFN		ZFN	Tulita	Northwest Territories
Tumbler Ridge Airport		CBX7		Tumbler Ridge	British Columbia
Tundra Mine/Salamita [sic] Mine Aerodrome		CTM7		Tundra Mine / Salmita Mine	Northwest Territories
Tungsten (Cantung) Airport		CBX5		Tungsten	Northwest Territories
Twin Creeks Airport		CFS7		Twin Creeks	Yukon
Two Hills Airport		CEL6		Two Hills	Alberta
Two Hills (Health Centre) Heliport		CTH4		Two Hills	Alberta
Tyendinaga (Mohawk) Airport		CPU6		Tyendinaga	Ontario

== U ==
Airport name	ICAO	TC LID	IATA	Community	Province or territory
List of airports in British Columbia#TUcluelet Water Aerodrome		CAN3		Ucluelet	British Columbia
Ullswater Aerodrome		CLW2		Ullswater	Ontario
Ulukhaktok Airport	CYHI		YHI	Ulukhaktok	Northwest Territories
Umiujaq Airport	CYMU		YUD	Umiujaq	Quebec
Unity Aerodrome		CKE8		Unity	Saskatchewan
Upper Kent Aerodrome		CCH2		Upper Kent	New Brunswick
Upsala Heliport		CKL8		Upsala	Ontario
Uranium City Airport	CYBE		YBE	Uranium City	Saskatchewan
Uranium City Water Aerodrome		CKG6		Uranium City	Saskatchewan
Utik Lake/Dennis G Punches Field Aerodrome		CDP3		Utik Lake	Manitoba
Uxbridge (Cottage Hospital) Heliport		CNA5		Uxbridge	Ontario

== V ==
Airport name	ICAO	TC LID	IATA	Community	Province or territory
Valcartier (W/C J.H.L. (Joe) Lecomte) Heliport (CFB Valcartier)	CYOY		YOY	Saint-Gabriel-de-Valcartier	Quebec
Valcourt Airport		CSQ3		Valcourt	Quebec
Val-d'Or Airport	CYVO		YVO	Val-d'Or	Quebec
Val-d'Or (Huard) Water Aerodrome		CVB6		Val-d'Or	Quebec
Val-d'Or/Lac Stabell Water Aerodrome		CLS2		Val-d'Or	Quebec
Val-d'Or/Rivière Piché Water Aerodrome		CTA5		Val-d'Or	Quebec
Val-d'Or (St-Pierre) Heliport		COR2		Val-d'Or	Quebec
Val-d'Or (St-Pierre) Water Aerodrome		CSP7		Val-d'Or	Quebec
Valemount Airport		CAH4		Valemount	British Columbia
Valemount (CMH) Heliport		CMH6		Valemount	British Columbia
Valemount (Yellowhead Helicopters) Heliport		CBV7		Valemount	British Columbia
Valleyview Airport		CEL5		Valleyview	Alberta
Valleyview (Health Centre) Heliport		CVV2		Valleyview	Alberta
Vancouver/Boundary Bay Airport (Boundary Bay Airport)	CZBB		YDT	Delta	British Columbia
Vancouver (Children & Women's Health Centre) Heliport		CAK7		Vancouver	British Columbia
Vancouver/Coquitlam Fire and Rescue Heliport		CFR6		Vancouver	British Columbia
Vancouver (General Hospital) Heliport		CBK4		Vancouver	British Columbia
Vancouver Harbour Flight Centre (Vancouver Harbour Water Airport, Vancouver Coal Harbour Seaplane Base)	CYHC		CXH	Vancouver	British Columbia
Vancouver/Harbour (Public) Heliport		CBC7		Vancouver	British Columbia
Vancouver International Airport	CYVR		YVR	Vancouver	British Columbia
Vancouver International Water Airport		CAM9		Vancouver	British Columbia
Vancouver/New Westminster (Royal Columbian Hospital) Heliport		CNW9		New Westminster	British Columbia
Vancouver (Surrey Memorial Hospital) Heliport		CVS3		Surrey	British Columbia
Vanderhoof Airport		CAU4		Vanderhoof	British Columbia
Vanderhoof Water Aerodrome		CVH3		Vanderhoof	British Columbia
Vauxhall Airport		CEN6		Vauxhall	Alberta
Vegerville (St. Joseph's General Hospital) Heliport		CVG8		Vegreville	Alberta
Vegreville Airport		CEV3		Vegreville	Alberta
Vermilion Airport	CYVG			Vermilion	Alberta
Vermilion Bay Airport		CKQ7		Machin	Ontario
Vermilion Bay Water Aerodrome		CKH6		Vermilion Bay	Ontario
Vermilion Health Centre Heliport		CVH2		Vermilion	Alberta
Vernon Regional Airport	CYVK		YVE	Vernon	British Columbia
Vernon/Wildlife Water Aerodrome		CVW2		Vernon	British Columbia
Victoria Airport Water Aerodrome		CAP5		Victoria	British Columbia
Victoria (General Hospital) Heliport		CBW7		Victoria	British Columbia
Victoria Harbour (Camel Point) Heliport		CBF7		Victoria	British Columbia
Victoria Harbour (Shoal Point) Heliport		CBZ7		Victoria	British Columbia
Victoria Inner Harbour Airport (Victoria Harbour Water Airport)	CYWH		YWH	Victoria	British Columbia
Victoria International Airport	CYYJ		YYJ	Victoria	British Columbia
Victoria (Royal Jubilee Hospital) Heliport		CBK8		Victoria	British Columbia
Victoriaville Airport		CSR3		Victoriaville	Quebec
Viking Airport		CEE8		Viking	Alberta
Viking Health Centre (George H. Roddick) Heliport		CGR5		Viking	Alberta
Villeneuve Airport (Edmonton/Villeneuve Airport)	CZVL	CZVL		Villeneuve	Alberta
Virden (Gabrielle Farm) Airport		CKR7		Virden	Manitoba
Virden/R.J. (Bob) Andrew Field Regional Aerodrome	CYVD			Virden	Manitoba
Vittoria/Heli-Lynx Heliport		CHL4		Vittoria	Ontario
Voisey's Bay Aerodrome		CVB2		Voisey's Bay Mine	Newfoundland and Labrador
Voyageur Channel Water Aerodrome		CVC2		Killarney	Ontario
Vulcan/Agro 1 Aerodrome		CAG4		Vulcan	Alberta
Vulcan Airport		CFX6		Vulcan	Alberta
Vulcan (Hospital) Heliport		CVH7		Vulcan	Alberta
Vulcan/Kirkcaldy Aerodrome (RCAF Station Vulcan)		CVL2		Vulcan	Alberta
Vulcan/Wlid Rose Aerodrome		CWR2		Vulcan	Alberta

== W ==
Airport name	ICAO	TC LID	IATA	Community	Province or territory
Wabasca Airport		CEE5		Wabasca	Alberta
Wabush Airport	CYWK		YWK	Wabush	Newfoundland and Labrador
Wabush Water Aerodrome		CCX5		Wabush	Newfoundland and Labrador
Wadena Airport		CKS7		Wadena	Saskatchewan
Wainwright Aerodrome	CYWV		YWV	Wainwright	Alberta
Wainwright/Camp Wainwright Field Heliport (CFB Wainwright) (Note: Wainwright/Camp Wainwright Field Airport is a 5,036 ft (1,535 m) grass strip located at the base, and Wainwright/Wainwright (Field 21) Airport is a 7,349 ft (2,240 m) asphalt runway approximately 7 NM (13 km; 8.1 mi) west of the base.)		CFF7		Wainwright	Alberta
Wainwright/Wainwright (Field 21) Airport (CFB Wainwright)	CYWN			Wainwright	Alberta
Wakaw Airport		CKT7		Wakaw	Saskatchewan
Walkerton (County Of Bruce General Hospital) Heliport		CNG6		Walkerton	Ontario
Wallaceburg/Chatham-Kent Health Alliance (Wallaceburg) Heliport		CSY7		Wallaceburg	Ontario
Walsingham/Ceilidh Aerodrome		CCL7		Walshingham	Ontario
Walter's Falls (Piper Way) Aerodrome		CWF2		Walter's Falls	Ontario
Warburg/Zajes Airport		CFH8		Warburg	Alberta
Warner Airport		CEP6		Warner	Alberta
Washago/Clearwater Lake North Heliport		CLK6		Washago	Ontario
Washago/Clearwater Lake North Water Aerodrome		CLK5		Washago	Ontario
Washago/Clearwater Lake Water Aerodrome		CCW6		Washago	Ontario
Waskaganish Airport	CYKQ		YKQ	Waskaganish	Quebec
Watrous Airport		CKU7		Watrous	Saskatchewan
Watson Lake Airport		CYQH	YQH	Watson Lake	Yukon
Watson Lake Water Aerodrome		CEJ9		Watson Lake	Yukon
Wawa Airport	CYXZ		YXZ	Wawa	Ontario
Webequie Airport	CYWP		YWP	Webequie First Nation	Ontario
Wekweètì Airport	CYWE			Wekweètì	Northwest Territories
Welland/Niagara Central Dorothy Rungeling Airport (Niagara Central Dorothy Rungeling Airport)		CNQ3		Welland	Ontario
Welland (Niagara Health System) Heliport		CPB3		Welland	Ontario
Wemindji Airport	CYNC		YNC	Wemindji	Quebec
West Guilford/Redstone Lake Water Aerodrome		CRL6		West Guilford	Ontario
West Kootenay Regional Airport (Castlegar Airport)	CYCG		YCG	Castlegar	British Columbia
Westlock Airport		CES4		Westlock	Alberta
Westlock (Healthcare Centre) Heliport		CAA3		Westlock	Alberta
Westlock (Hnatko Farms) Aerodrome		CHF3		Westlock	Alberta
Westport/Rideau Lakes Airport		CRL2		Westport	Ontario
Wetaskiwin (Hospital & Care Centre) Heliport		CWC4		Wetaskiwin	Alberta
Wetaskiwin Regional Airport		CEX3		Wetaskiwin	Alberta
Weyburn Airport		CJE3		Weyburn	Saskatchewan
Weyman Airpark		CCG3		Keswick River	New Brunswick
Weymontachie Airport		CSU5		Wemotaci	Quebec
Whale Cove Airport	CYXN		YXN	Whale Cove	Nunavut
Whaletown Water Aerodrome		CAW9		Whaletown	British Columbia
Whatì Airport		CEM3		Whatì	Northwest Territories
Whatì Water Aerodrome		CEQ8		Whatì	Northwest Territories
Wheatland/Spud Plains Aerodrome		CRS5		Wheatland	Manitoba
Wheatley (Robinson Motorcycles) Aerodrome		CRM5		Wheatley	Ontario
Whistler/Green Lake Water Aerodrome		CAE5		Whistler	British Columbia
Whistler (Hospital) Heliport		CAW4		Whistler	British Columbia
Whistler (Municipal) Heliport		CBE9	YWS	Whistler	British Columbia
Whitecourt Airport	CYZU		YZU	Whitecourt	Alberta
Whitefish/Lake Panache Water Aerodrome		CPN9		Whitefish	Ontario
Whitehorse/Cousins Airport		CFP8		Whitehorse	Yukon
Whitehorse Water Aerodrome		CEZ5		Whitehorse (Schwatka Lake)	Yukon
White Lake Water Aerodrome		CWL2		White Lake	Ontario
White River Water Aerodrome		CNJ8	YWR	White River	Ontario
White Saddle Ranch Heliport		CBD9		White Saddle Ranch	British Columbia
Whitewood Airport		CKY2		Whitewood	Saskatchewan
Wiarton Airport	CYVV		YVV	Wiarton	Ontario
Wiarton/Beattie Lake Water Aerodrome		CBT2		Wiarton	Ontario
Wiarton/Hay Island Aerodrome		CHA4		Wiarton	Ontario
Wiebenville Aerodrome		CXX2		Kenora District	Ontario
Wildwood/Loche Mist Farms Aerodrome		CJJ3		Wildwood	Alberta
Wiley Aerodrome		CAJ2		Eagle Plains	Yukon
Williams Lake Airport	CYWL			Williams Lake	British Columbia
Williams Lake (Frontline Helicopters) Heliport		CFH2	YWL	Williams Lake	British Columbia
Windermere/Rostrevor Heliport		CRS6		Windermere	Ontario
Windsor International Airport	CYQG		YQG	Windsor	Ontario
Winfield (Wood Lake) Water Aerodrome		CAY9		Winfield	British Columbia
Wingham (Inglis Field) Aerodrome		CWH5		Wingham	Ontario
Wingham/Richard W. LeVan Aerodrome		CPR7		Wingham	Ontario
Winkler Aerodrome		CKZ7		Winkler	Manitoba
Winnipeg (City of Winnipeg) Heliport		CWG2		Winnipeg	Manitoba
Winnipeg (Health Sciences Centre) Heliport		CWH7		Winnipeg	Manitoba
Winnipeg James Armstrong Richardson International Airport (CFB Winnipeg)	CYWG		YWG	Winnipeg	Manitoba
Winnipeg/Lyncrest Airport		CJL5		Lyncrest	Manitoba
Winnipeg/St. Andrews Airport (St. Andrews Airport)	CYAV			St. Andrews	Manitoba
Winterland Airport		CCC2		Winterland	Newfoundland and Labrador
Wollaston Lake Airport	CZWL		ZWL	Hatchet Lake Denesuline First Nation	Saskatchewan
Woodcock Airport		CBQ8		Woodcock	British Columbia
Woodland/Kendall Farm Aerodrome		CWL4		Woodland	Manitoba
Woodstock Aerodrome		CCD3		Woodstock	New Brunswick
Woodstock (Hospital) Heliport		CWH3		Woodstock	Ontario
Woodstock (Norm Beckham/Bob Hewitt Field) Aerodrome		CPR5		Woodstock	Ontario
Woodstock/Snokist Heliport		CSN4		Woodstock	New Brunswick
Wrigley Airport	CYWY		YWY	Wrigley	Northwest Territories
Wrong Lake Airport		CJG4		Wrong Lake	Manitoba
Wroxeter/Harkes Field Aerodrome		CHF5		Wroxeter	Ontario
Wunnumin Lake Airport		CKL3	WNN	Wunnumin Lake First Nation	Ontario
Wynyard/W. B. Needham Field Aerodrome	CYYO			Wynyard	Saskatchewan

== Y ==
Airport name	ICAO	TC LID	IATA	Community	Province or territory
Yarmouth Airport	CYQI		YQI	Yarmouth	Nova Scotia
Yarmouth (Regional Hospital) Heliport		CDU3		Yarmouth	Nova Scotia
Yellowknife Airport	CYZF		YZF	Yellowknife	Northwest Territories
Yellowknife Water Aerodrome		CEN9		Yellowknife	Northwest Territories
York Landing Airport	CZAC		ZAC	York Factory First Nation	Manitoba
Yorkton Regional Airport (RCAF Station Yorkton)	CYQV		YQV	Yorkton	Saskatchewan
YYC Calgary International Airport (Calgary/YYC Calgary International Airport)	CYYC	CYYC	YYC	Calgary	Alberta

== Z ==
Airport name	ICAO	TC LID	IATA	Community	Province or territory
Zeballos Water Aerodrome		CAA5		Zeballos	British Columbia
Zephyr/Dillon Field Aerodrome	CZF2			Zephyr	Ontario
Zhoda Airport		CKA4		Zhoda	Manitoba
