= List of airports in the Northwest Territories =

Northwest Territories

This is a list of airports in the Northwest Territories. It includes all Nav Canada certified and registered water and land airports, aerodromes and heliports in the Canadian territory of the Northwest Territories. Airport names in italics are part of the National Airports System.

== List of airports and heliports ==
The list is sorted by the name of the community served; click the sort buttons in the table header to switch listing order.

Community	Airport name	PU PR MI	AOE (Note: An airport of entry has four different categories. An AOE which can accept "all classes of scheduled and non-scheduled aircraft (passenger and cargo)." An AOE/# which can handle aircraft in the previous category but up to maximum number. This number can be exceeded if done in stages as shown in parentheses. An AOE/15 that can accept general aviation aircraft with a maximum of 15 passengers. An AOE/CAN which can handle aircraft subject to the CANPASS regulations.)	Operator	Elevation	ICAO	TC LID	IATA	Image	Coordinates
Aklavik	Aklavik/Freddie Carmichael Airport	PU		Govt of Northwest Territories	21 ft (6.4 m)	CYKD		LAK		68°13′24″N 135°00′21″W
Aklavik	Aklavik Water Aerodrome	PU		K & D Contracting	7 ft (2.1 m)		CER6			68°13′21″N 134°59′30″W
Behchokǫ̀	Rae/Edzo Airport	PU		Til Cho Construction	587 ft (179 m)		CRE2			62°46′00″N 116°05′01″W
Colville Lake	Colville Lake/Tommy Kochon Aerodrome	PU		Govt of Northwest Territories	899 ft (274 m)	CYVL		YCK		67°02′00″N 126°05′00″W
Colville Lake	Colville Lake Water Aerodrome	PU		Kapami Co-op Association	801 ft (244 m)		CED7			67°02′29″N 126°06′02″W
Délı̨nę	Déline Airport	PU		Govt of Northwest Territories	702 ft (214 m)	CYWJ		YWJ		65°12′40″N 123°26′11″W
Délı̨nę	Déline Water Aerodrome	PU		Charter Community of Déline	512 ft (156 m)		CEN7			65°11′00″N 123°25′00″W
Diavik Diamond Mine	Diavik Airport	PR		Diavik Diamond Mines	1,416 ft (432 m)		CDK2			64°30′41″N 110°17′22″W
Ekati Diamond Mine	Ekati Airport	PR		Arctic Canadian Diamond Company	1,536 ft (468 m)	CYOA		YOA		64°41′56″N 110°36′53″W
Ford Bay, Great Bear Lake	Ford Bay Airport	PR		Trophy Lodge	673 ft (205 m)		CBC2			66°02′15″N 124°42′54″W
Ford Bay, Great Bear Lake	Ford Bay Water Aerodrome	PR		Trophy Lodge	512 ft (156 m)		CEL7			66°02′00″N 124°41′00″W
Fort Good Hope	Fort Good Hope Airport	PU		Govt of Northwest Territories	267 ft (81 m)	CYGH		YGH		66°14′27″N 128°39′03″W
Fort Liard	Fort Liard Airport	PU		Govt of Northwest Territories	708 ft (216 m)	CYJF		YJF		60°14′08″N 123°28′12″W
Fort McPherson	Fort McPherson Airport	PU		Govt of Northwest Territories	115 ft (35 m)	CZFM		ZFM		67°24′27″N 134°51′38″W
Fort Providence	Fort Providence Airport	PU		Govt of Northwest Territories	525 ft (160 m)	CYJP				61°19′09″N 117°36′22″W
Fort Reliance	Fort Reliance Water Aerodrome	PU		Lutselk'e Dene Council	514 ft (157 m)		CJN8			62°42′00″N 109°10′00″W
Fort Resolution	Fort Resolution Airport	PU		Govt of Northwest Territories	527 ft (161 m)	CYFR		YFR		61°10′51″N 113°41′23″W
Fort Simpson	Fort Simpson Airport	PU		Govt of Northwest Territories	556 ft (169 m)	CYFS		YFS		61°45′37″N 121°14′11″W
Fort Simpson	Fort Simpson (Great Slave No. 1) Heliport	PR		Govt of Northwest Territories	500 ft (150 m)		CFS2			61°50′18″N 121°19′35″W
Fort Simpson	Fort Simpson (Great Slave No. 2) Heliport	PR		Govt of Northwest Territories	48 ft (15 m)		CFD8			61°50′12″N 121°19′30″W
Fort Simpson	Fort Simpson Island Airport	PR		Simpson Air; South Nahanni Airways	405 ft (123 m)		CET4			61°52′00″N 121°21′58″W
Fort Simpson	Fort Simpson Island Water Aerodrome	PR		Wolverine Air / Simpson Air	375 ft (114 m)		CEZ7			61°52′00″N 121°22′00″W
Fort Smith	Fort Smith Airport	PU		Govt of Northwest Territories	673 ft (205 m)	CYSM		YSM		60°01′13″N 111°57′43″W
Fort Smith	Fort Smith (District) Heliport	PR		Department of Environment & Climate Change, Govt of Northwest Territories	665 ft (203 m)		CEC5			60°00′11″N 111°54′34″W
Frank Channel	Frank Channel (Forestry) Heliport	PR		Department of Environment & Climate Change, Govt of Northwest Territories	520 ft (160 m)		CFB2			62°47′10″N 115°56′45″W
Gahcho Kue Diamond Mine	Gahcho Kue Aerodrome	PR		De Beers Canada	1,429 ft (436 m)		CGK2			63°26′07″N 109°08′41″W
Gamèti	Gamètì/Rae Lakes Airport	PU		Govt of Northwest Territories	724 ft (221 m)	CYRA		YRA		64°06′58″N 117°18′35″W
Graham Lake	Graham Lake (Yellow Dog Lodge) Water Aerodrome	PR		Yellow Dog Lodge	725 ft (221 m)		CYD2			62°53′28″N 113°52′04″W
Great Bear Lake	Great Bear Lake Airport	PR		Plummers Great Bear Lake Lodge	551 ft (168 m)		CFF4	DAS		66°42′11″N 119°43′02″W
Great Bear Lake	Great Bear Lake Water Aerodrome	PU		Plummers Great Bear Lake Lodge	512 ft (156 m)		CES9			66°42′30″N 119°41′00″W
Great Slave Lake	Taltheilei Narrows Airport	PR		Plummers Great Slave Lake Lodge	617 ft (188 m)		CFA7			62°35′50″N 111°32′28″W
Great Slave Lake	Taltheilei Narrows Water Aerodrome	PR		Plummers Great Slave Lake Lodge	514 ft (157 m)		CED9			62°36′00″N 111°31′00″W
Hay River	Hay River/Merlyn Carter Airport	PU		Govt of Northwest Territories	541 ft (165 m)	CYHY		YHY		60°50′23″N 115°46′58″W
Hay River	Hay River (District) Heliport	PR		Department of Environment & Natural Resources, Govt of Northwest Territories	550 ft (170 m)		CET5			60°47′04″N 115°49′33″W
Hay River	Hay River Water Aerodrome	PR		Carter Air Service	514 ft (157 m)		CEF8			60°51′07″N 115°43′50″W
Inuvik	Inuvik (Mike Zubko) Airport	PU	15	Govt of Northwest Territories	223 ft (68 m)	CYEV		YEV		68°18′14″N 133°28′59″W
Inuvik	Inuvik/Shell Lake Water Aerodrome	PU	15 (Note: Seaplanes only.)	North-Wright Airways	57 ft (17 m)		CEE3			68°19′28″N 133°38′04″W
Jean Marie River	Jean Marie River Airport	PU		Govt of Northwest Territories	457 ft (139 m)		CET9			61°31′21″N 120°37′30″W
Kasba Lake	Kasba Lake Airport	PR		Kasba Lake Lodge	1,143 ft (348 m)		CJL8			60°17′27″N 102°30′11″W
Kasba Lake	Kasba Lake Water Aerodrome	PR		Kasba Lake Lodge	1,089 ft (332 m)		CJP5			60°17′00″N 102°31′00″W
Łutselk'e	Lutselk'e Airport	PU		Govt of Northwest Territories	586 ft (179 m)	CYLK				62°25′06″N 110°40′56″W
Łutselk'e	Lutselk'e Water Aerodrome	PU		Łutselk'e Dene Council	514 ft (157 m)		CEB9			62°24′00″N 110°45′00″W
Nahanni Butte	Nahanni Butte Airport	PU		Govt of Northwest Territories	598 ft (182 m)		CBD6			61°01′47″N 123°23′20″W
Nahanni National Park Reserve	Náįlįcho Water Aerodrome	PR		Nahanni National Park Reserve	2,200 ft (670 m)		CFV5			61°36′27″N 125°45′24″W
Namushka Lodge (Harding Lake)	Namushka Lodge Water Aerodrome	PR		Namuska Lodge	670 ft (200 m)		CEP9			62°25′00″N 113°21′00″W
Norman Wells	Norman Wells Airport	PU		Govt of Northwest Territories	237 ft (72 m)	CYVQ		YVQ		65°16′54″N 126°47′54″W
Norman Wells	Norman Wells Water Aerodrome	PR		Northwright Air Ltd.	200 ft (61 m)		CEU8			65°15′29″N 126°41′29″W
North of Sixty Fishing Camps	Obre Lake/North of Sixty Airport	PR		North of Sixty Fishing Camps	1,202 ft (366 m)		CKV4	YDW		60°18′56″N 103°07′54″W
North of Sixty Fishing Camps	Obre Lake/North of Sixty Water Aerodrome	PR		North of Sixty Fishing Camps	1,150 ft (350 m)		CKP8			60°19′13″N 103°07′36″W
Paulatuk	Paulatuk (Nora Aliqatchialuk Ruben) Airport	PU		Govt of Northwest Territories	15 ft (4.6 m)	CYPC		YPC		69°21′38″N 124°04′33″W
Paulatuk	Paulatuk Water Aerodrome	PU		Hamlet	0 ft (0 m)		CEW8			69°21′00″N 124°04′00″W
Prairie Creek	Prairie Creek Airport	PR		Canadian Zinc Corp.	2,950 ft (900 m)		CBH4			61°33′53″N 124°48′54″W
Sachs Harbour	Sachs Harbour (David Nasogaluak Jr. Saaryuaq) Airport	PU		Govt of Northwest Territories	283 ft (86 m)	CYSY		YSY		71°59′38″N 125°14′33″W
Sambaa K'e	Sambaa K'e Aerodrome	PU		Govt of Northwest Territories	1,666 ft (508 m)		CEU9			60°25′25″N 121°16′11″W
Sambaa K'e	Sambaa K'e Water Aerodrome	PU		Sambaa K'e First Nation	1,623 ft (495 m)		CEG9			60°26′32″N 121°14′10″W
Snare River	Snare River Airport	PR		Northwest Territories Power Corporation	700 ft (210 m)		CEV9			63°26′00″N 116°11′00″W
Taltson River	Taltson River Airport	PR		Northwest Territories Power Corporation	875 ft (267 m)		CFW5			60°23′39″N 111°20′50″W
Tuktoyaktuk	Tuktoyaktuk/James Gruben Airport	PU	15	Govt of Northwest Territories	14 ft (4.3 m)	CYUB		YUB		69°26′00″N 133°01′35″W
Tulita	Tulita Airport	PU		Govt of Northwest Territories	329 ft (100 m)	CZFN		ZFN		64°54′35″N 125°34′21″W
Tundra Mine / Salmita Mine	Tundra Mine/Salamita [sic] Mine Aerodrome	PR		Indigenous and Northern Affairs Canada	1,382 ft (421 m)		CTM7			64°04′22″N 111°09′48″W
Tungsten	Tungsten (Cantung) Airport	PR		North American Tungsten Corp	3,651 ft (1,113 m)		CBX5			61°57′25″N 128°12′10″W
Ulukhaktok	Ulukhaktok Airport	PU		Govt of Northwest Territories	118 ft (36 m)	CYHI		YHI		70°45′46″N 117°48′22″W
Wekweètì	Wekweètì Airport	PU		Govt of Northwest Territories	1,208 ft (368 m)	CYWE				64°11′27″N 114°04′36″W
Whatì	Whatì Airport	PU		Govt of Northwest Territories	882 ft (269 m)		CEM3			63°07′54″N 117°14′46″W
Whatì	Whatì Water Aerodrome	PU		Whatì Hamlet	870 ft (270 m)		CEQ8			63°09′00″N 117°16′00″W
Wrigley	Wrigley Airport	PU		Govt of Northwest Territories	490 ft (150 m)	CYWY		YWY		63°12′34″N 123°26′12″W
Yellowknife	Yellowknife Airport	PU	15	Govt of Northwest Territories	675 ft (206 m)	CYZF		YZF		62°27′46″N 114°26′25″W
Yellowknife	Yellowknife Water Aerodrome	PU		Ahmic Air; Air Tindi	514 ft (157 m)		CEN9			62°28′00″N 114°21′00″W

== Defunct airports ==
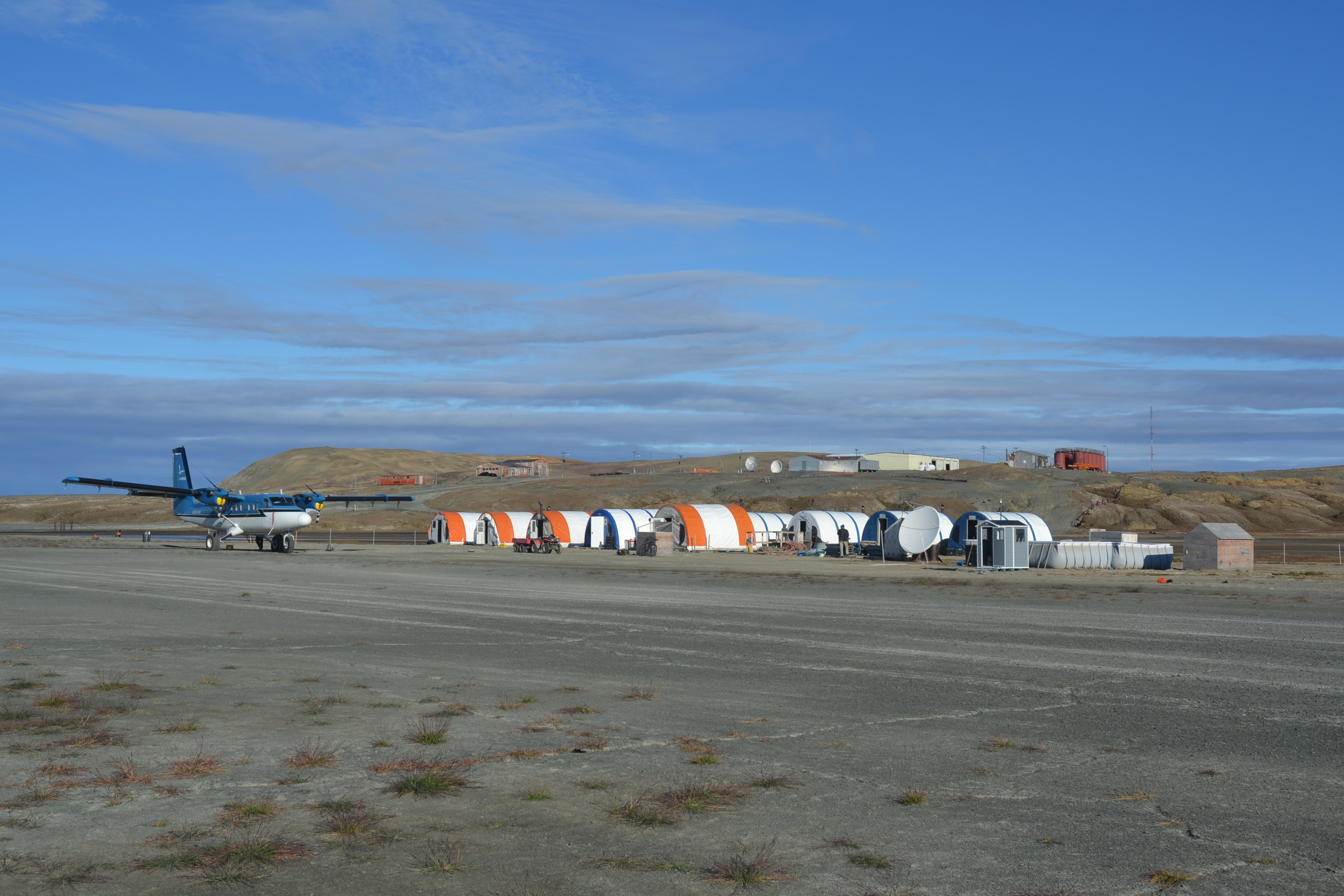
Mould Bay Airport

Community	Airport name	ICAO	TC LID	IATA	Coordinates
Colomac Mine	Colomac Airport		CFY8		64°23′06″N 115°07′29″W
Fort McPherson	Fort McPherson Water Aerodrome		CEU7		67°27′00″N 134°53′00″W
Fort Providence	Fort Providence Water Aerodrome		CEX7		61°21′00″N 117°40′00″W
Fort Smith	Fitzgerald (Fort Smith) Water Aerodrome		CEJ7		59°51′00″N 111°36′00″W
Hay River	Hay River/Brabant Lodge Water Aerodrome		CEA8		61°03′00″N 116°36′00″W
Nahanni Butte	Nahanni Butte Water Aerodrome		CET8		61°02′00″N 123°21′00″W
Prince Patrick Island	Mould Bay Airport			YMD	76°14′21″N 119°19′07″W
Snap Lake Diamond Mine	Snap Lake Airport		CSK6		63°35′37″N 110°54′20″W
Thor Lake	Thor Lake Aerodrome	CYMD	CTH2		62°06′03″N 112°37′32″W
Tsiigehtchic	Arctic Red River Water Aerodrome		CES6		67°27′00″N 133°45′00″W

== See also ==
- List of airports in the Fort Simpson area
