= YGH =

YGH may refer to:

- Fort Good Hope Airport (IATA code: YGH), in the Northwest Territories, Canada
- Yangon General Hospital, a major public hospital in Yangon, Myanmar
