= CYFS =

CYFS may refer to:

- CYFS - New Zealand Department of Child, Youth and Family Services.
- CYOA - Fort Simpson Airport in the Northwest Territories.
