= Yellowknife Airport =

Airport in Yellowknife, Northwest Territories, Canada

Yellowknife Airport Aéroport de Yellowknife
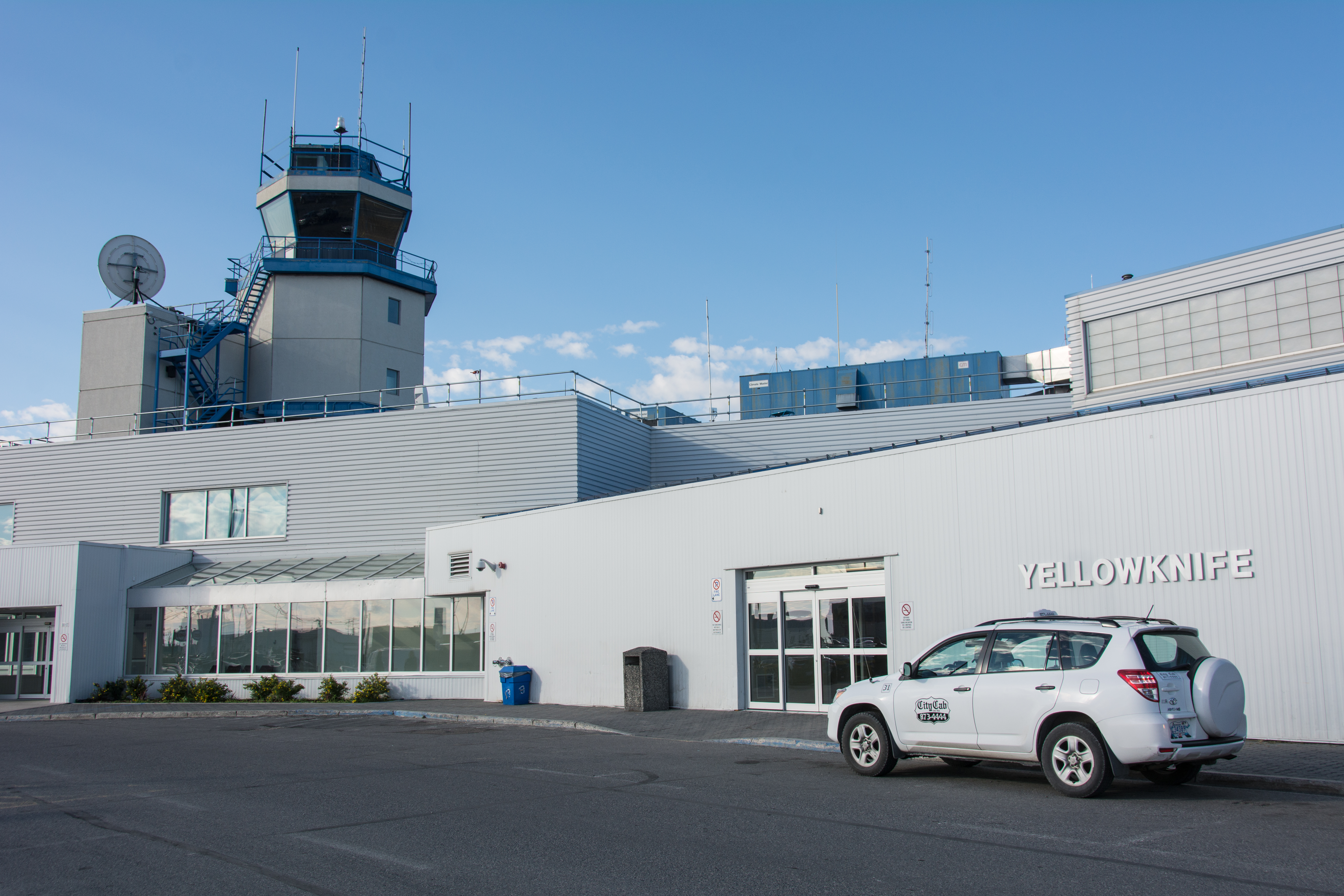
- IATA: YZF; ICAO: CYZF; WMO: 71936

Summary
- Airport type: Public
- Owner/Operator: Government of the Northwest Territories
- Location: Yellowknife, Northwest Territories
- Opened: 1944
- Hub for: Adlair Aviation, Air Tindi, Buffalo Airways, Canadian North, Northwestern Air, Summit Air
- Time zone: Northwest Territories Time (UTC−06:00)
- Elevation AMSL: 675 ft (206 m)
- Coordinates: 62°27′47″N 114°26′25″W
- Website: flyyzf.ca

Map
- Location within Northwest Territories Location within Canada

Runways
Direction	Length		Surface
Direction	ft	m	Surface
16/34	7,503	2,287	Asphalt
10/28	5,001	1,524	Asphalt

Statistics (2025)
- Passengers: 618,177
- Aircraft movements: 45,737
- Sources: Canada Flight Supplement; Environment Canada; Passenger traffic and Movements from Government of NWT

Yellowknife Airport (IATA: YZF, ICAO: CYZF) is located in Yellowknife, Northwest Territories, Canada. The airport is part of the National Airports System, and is operated by the Government of the Northwest Territories. The airport has regular scheduled passenger service and a number of freight services. In 2025, the airport handled 618,177 passengers and 45,737 aircraft movements.

In 2008, the airport's passenger terminal underwent an expansion to the departure/check-in section, roughly doubling the size of the terminal. The airport is classified as an airport of entry by Nav Canada and is staffed by the Canada Border Services Agency (CBSA). CBSA officers at this airport can handle general aviation aircraft only, with no more than 15 passengers.

The Royal Canadian Mounted Police (RCMP) "G" Division maintains a hangar for its air section just south of the passenger terminal. It is adjacent to a hangar used by the Royal Canadian Air Force (RCAF) to house the CC-138 Twin Otter and other utility aircraft operated by 440 Transport Squadron, a subsidiary of 8 Wing.

Canadian NORAD Region Forward Operating Location Yellowknife is located south-west of the airstrip. It was built for forwarding deployment of the McDonnell Douglas CF-18 Hornet in times of conflict.

== History ==
Yellowknife Airport was initially built by Canadian Pacific Airlines in 1944, then sold to the federal Department of Transport in 1946. A new terminal building was built in 1963 and control tower in 1972. Renovation to these facilities were completed in 1967, 1998 and 2005−2006.

During the 2023 Canadian wildfires the city of Yellowknife was evacuated, and so the airport served as a means for evacuees to leave the city. Air Canada added extra flights to assist with the evacuation before suspending service to Yellowknife due to the fires.

== Airlines and destinations ==
=== Passenger ===
Airlines	Destinations
Air Canada	Edmonton (begins October 25, 2026)
Air Canada Express	Edmonton (ends October 24, 2026), Vancouver
Air North	Edmonton (begins December 3, 2026), Toronto–Pearson, Whitehorse; Seasonal: Ottawa, Vancouver
Air Tindi	Edmonton, Fort Chipewyan, Fort Simpson, Fort Smith, Gamèti, Hay River, Lutselk'e, Wekweètì
Canadian North	Cambridge Bay, Edmonton, Fort Simpson, Gjoa Haven, Hay River, Inuvik, Iqaluit, Kugaaruk, Kugluktuk, Norman Wells, Ottawa, Rankin Inlet, Taloyoak, Ulukhaktok
North-Wright Airways	Colville Lake, Déline, Fort Good Hope, Norman Wells, Tulita
WestJet	Calgary
WestJet Encore	Calgary, Edmonton

=== Cargo ===
Airlines	Destinations
Buffalo Airways	Cambridge Bay, Déline, Edmonton, Fort Good Hope, Hay River, Kugluktuk, Norman Wells, Tulita

== Emergency services ==
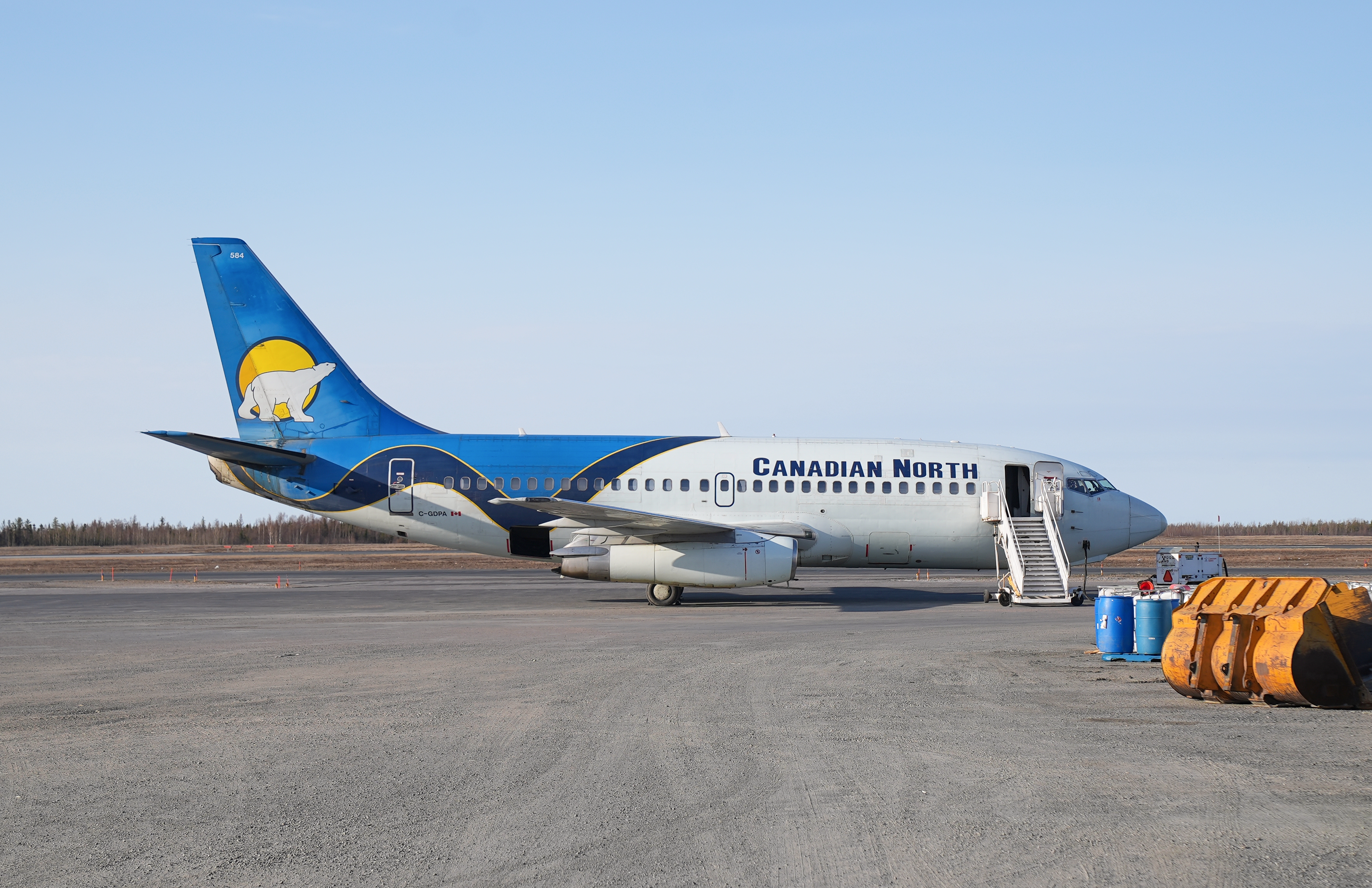
Canadian North's last 737-200, parked in Yellowknife a day before its retirement

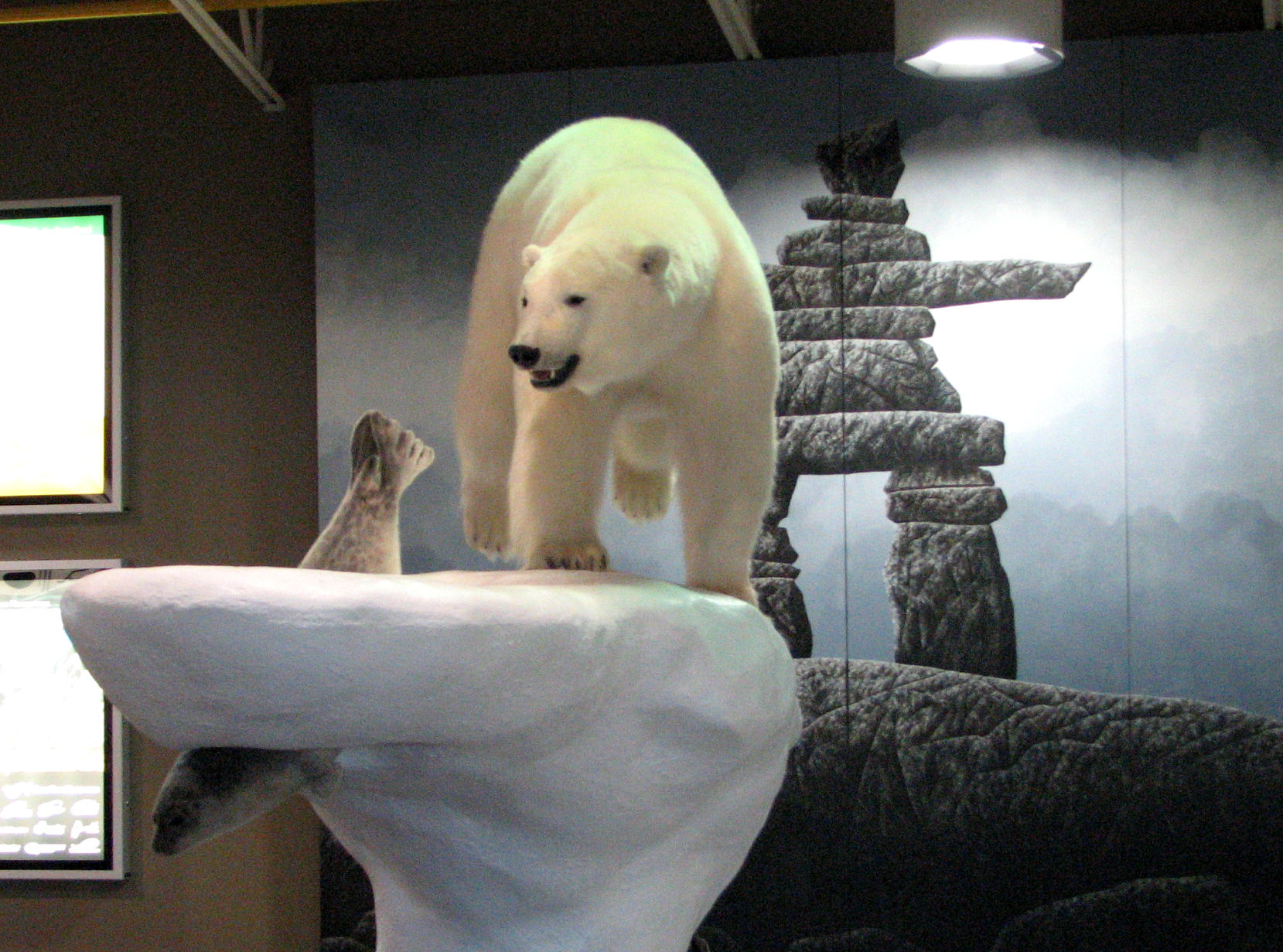
Polar bear and seal sculpture, in airport lobby

The airport has its own fire and rescue service. The department has ten firefighters, but requires only two or three firefighters on shift to operate a single crash tender. Ambulance and additional fire response are provided by the Yellowknife Fire Department.

== See also ==
- Yellowknife Water Aerodrome
