= ZFN =

ZFN is an acronym that may refer to:

- Tulita Airport, an airport in Canada
- Zinc finger nuclease, a nuclease enzyme coupled to a zinc finger-based DNA-binding domain
- The Zero-Configuration File Network, an open-source network program
