= Norman Wells Airport =

Airport in the Northwest Territories, Canada

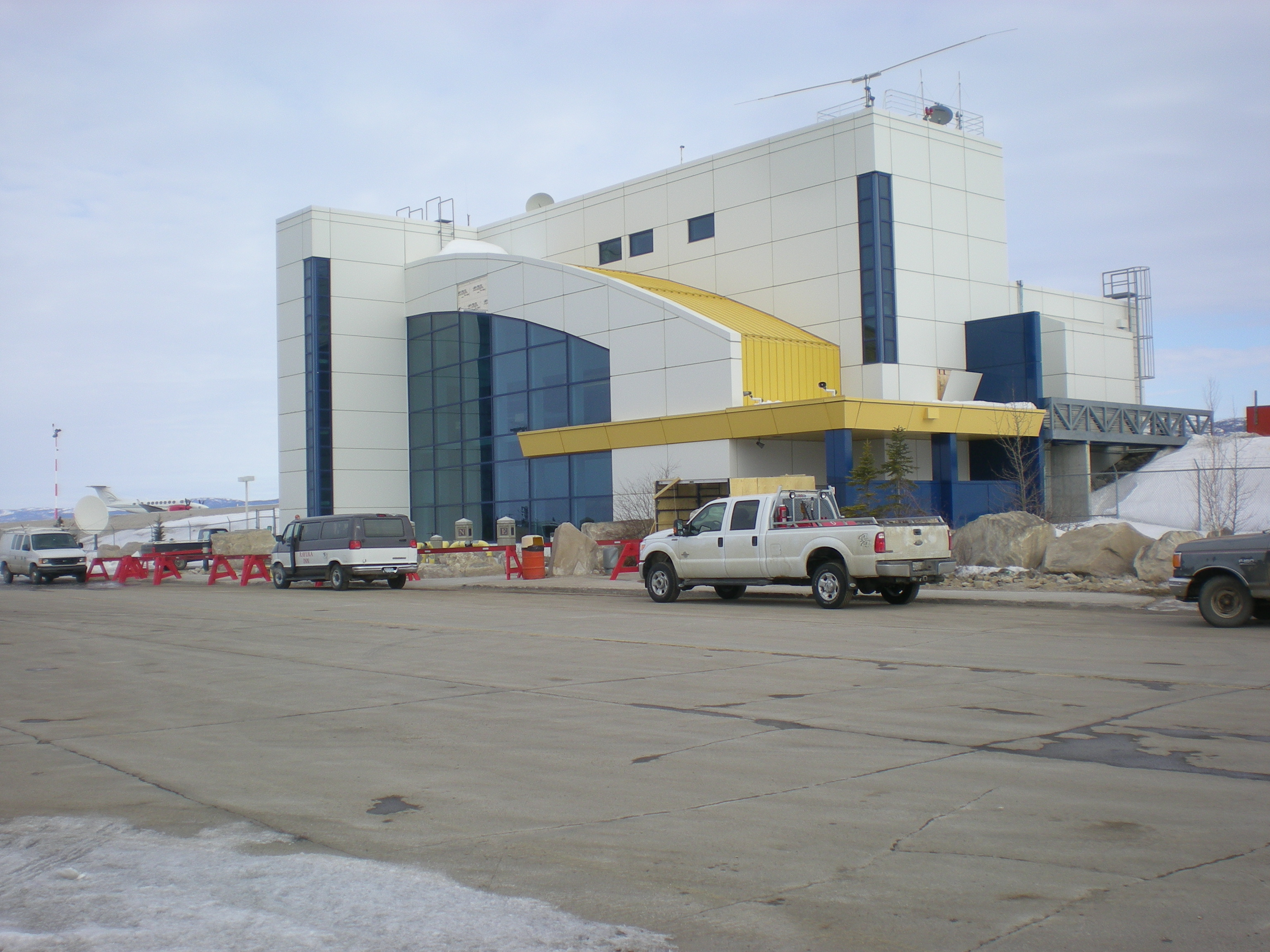
- IATA: YVQ; ICAO: CYVQ; WMO: 71043

Summary
- Airport type: Public
- Operator: Government of Northwest Territories
- Location: Norman Wells, Northwest Territories
- Hub for: North-Wright Airways
- Time zone: Northwest Territories Time (UTC−06:00)
- Elevation AMSL: 237 ft (72 m)
- Coordinates: 65°16′53″N 126°47′55″W

Map
- Location in the Northwest Territories CYVQ (Canada)

Runways
Direction	Length		Surface
Direction	ft	m	Surface
10/28	5,998	1,828	Concrete / asphalt

Statistics (2010)
- Aircraft movements: 13,885
- Sources: Canada Flight Supplement; Environment Canada; Movements from Statistics Canada

Norman Wells Airport (IATA: YVQ, ICAO: CYVQ) is located adjacent to Norman Wells, Northwest Territories, Canada. North-Wright Airways has its hangar and office adjacent to the airport.

== Airlines and destinations ==
Airlines	Destinations
Canadian North	Inuvik, Yellowknife
North-Wright Airways	Colville Lake, Deline, Fort Good Hope, Inuvik, Tulita, Yellowknife

=== Cargo ===
Airlines	Destinations
Buffalo Airways	Yellowknife

== Accidents and incidents ==
On 5 January 1972, a Douglas C-47B (registered as CF-KAH) of Mackenzie Air was damaged beyond economic repair at the Norman Wells Airport.

== See also ==
- Norman Wells Water Aerodrome
