= CYOA =

CYOA may refer to:

- Ekati Airport, an airport at the Ekati Diamond Mine, Canada, ICAO code CYOA
- Gamebook, or choose your own adventure books (CYOA), a fiction book that allows the reader to participate in the story
  - Choose Your Own Adventure, a series of children's gamebooks
