= Déline Airport =

Airport in the Northwest Territories, Canada

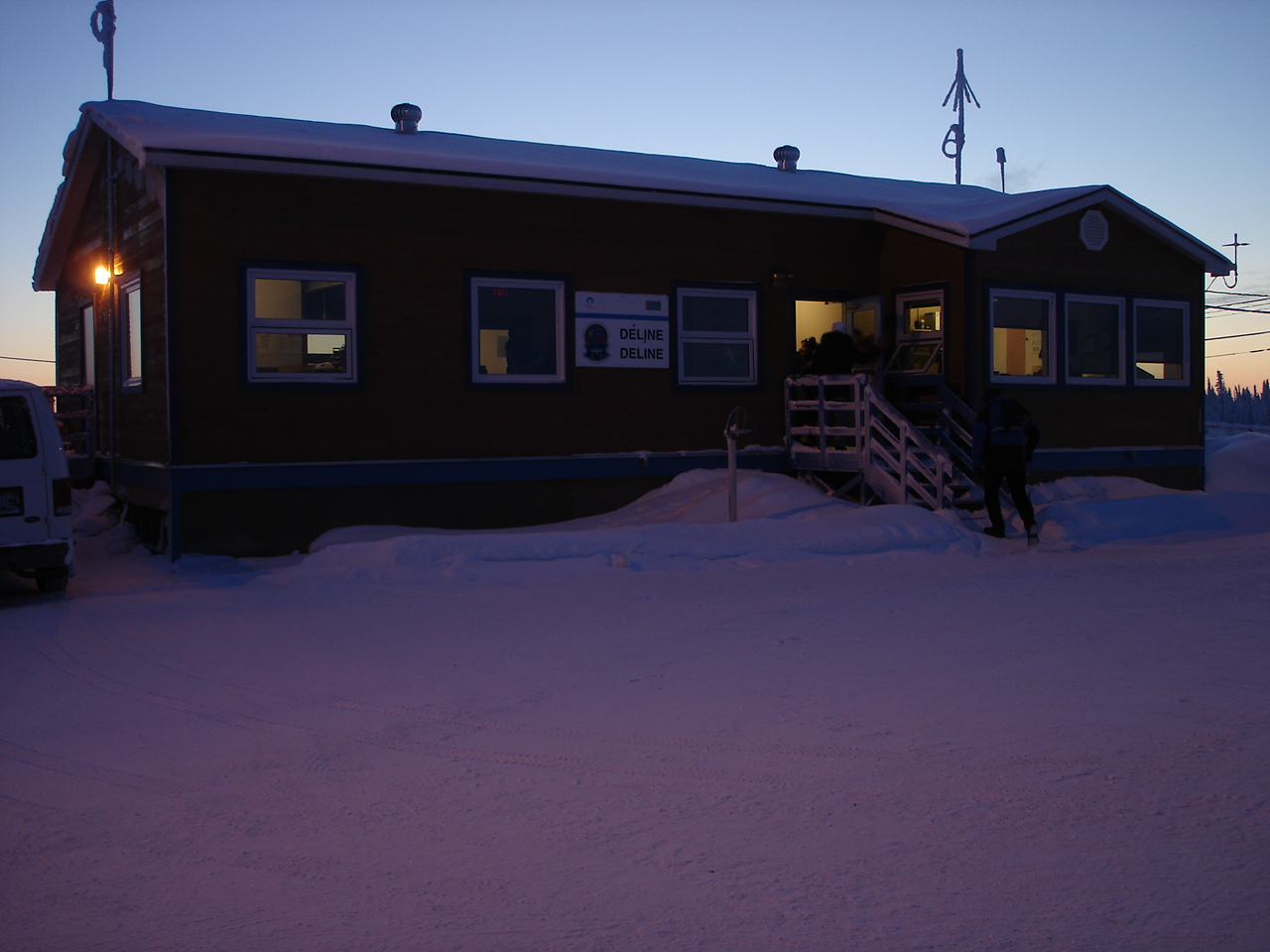
- IATA: YWJ; ICAO: CYWJ; WMO: 71503

Summary
- Airport type: Public
- Operator: Government of the Northwest Territories
- Location: Deline, Northwest Territories
- Time zone: Northwest Territories Time (UTC−06:00)
- Elevation AMSL: 702 ft (214 m)
- Coordinates: 65°12′40″N 123°26′11″W

Map
- Location in the Northwest Territories

Runways
Direction	Length		Surface
Direction	ft	m	Surface
08/26	3,933	1,199	Gravel

Statistics (2010)
- Aircraft movements: 1,966
- Sources: Canada Flight Supplement; Environment Canada; Movements from Statistics Canada.

Déline Airport (IATA: YWJ, ICAO: CYWJ) is an airport located 1.4 nautical miles (2.6 km; 1.6 mi) northwest of Deline, Northwest Territories, Canada. Caribou may be found on the runway. The airport was previously known as Fort Franklin Airport.

The passenger and cargo shelter was put to tender by the federal government in 1979, as was construction of the runway.

The airport played a role in the first episode of Arctic Air.

== Airlines and destinations ==
Airlines	Destinations
North-Wright Airways	Norman Wells, Tulita, Yellowknife

=== Cargo ===
Airlines	Destinations
Buffalo Airways	Yellowknife

== See also ==
- Deline Water Aerodrome
