= Bombing Hitler's Dams =

"Bombing Hitler's Dams" is an episode on NOVA in which Hugh Hunt enlists the help of Buffalo Airways and others in an attempt to recreate the bouncing bomb used in World War II's Operation Chastise.

== Design and testing ==
Hunt's goal was to create a small drum of steel, filled with concrete that could skip across water like the original bouncing bomb. The recreated "bouncing bomb" was not a live bomb (because it is illegal to drop live explosives from a civilian airplane) and weighed less than a tenth of the original. The real bouncing bomb's blueprints were lost in a 1960s flood, so Hunt's "bomb" was created from scratch.

In their tests Buffalo Airways pilot Arnie Schreder flew a Douglas DC-4, with the bomb attached underneath, towards a recreation of the Möhne dam, which was specially constructed on Lake Williston, Canada for the test. The DC-4 was flown along the lake, and the bomb released when they reached a floating marker. If a bomb (5 were made, so multiple attempts could be made) was to successfully hit the fake Möhne dam, a real bomb buried in the fake dam would be detonated, blowing apart the dam.

== Challenges ==
There were many difficulties and problems in "bombing Hitler's dams". One fake bouncing bomb was unbalanced (due to uneven application of paint). The fake Möhne dam leaked at the junction of the dam and the walls of the canal (that the dam was located in). The bomb did not spin for a long enough time and it was risky for a DC-4 to fly very low (60 feet) with an 800-pound object attached. The splash of the bomb hitting the water could damage the DC-4, and there was trouble telling how high the DC-4 was flying because the altimeter was not accurate enough to determine the altitude below 60 feet.

== Final test ==
In the final experiment, everything went fairly well. However the bomb that was chosen was unbalanced. All bombs had to be balanced to ensure they rotated without vibration being introduced into the aircraft. Bombs were balanced within 20g, and it was observed that even the presence of more yellow paint on one side than black paint on the opposite side caused the bomb to be out of balance. The selection of the single unbalanced bomb delayed the experiment. Also, when the aircraft dropped the bomb, it was at 40 ft rather than the planned 60 ft. The splash of the bomb hitting the water struck the tail of the aircraft (a Douglas DC-4), although there was no major damage. The bomb successfully struck the false dam on the first try and the dam was blown up by the internal bomb.
