= North-Wright Airways =

Airline based in Norman Wells, Northwest Territories, Canada

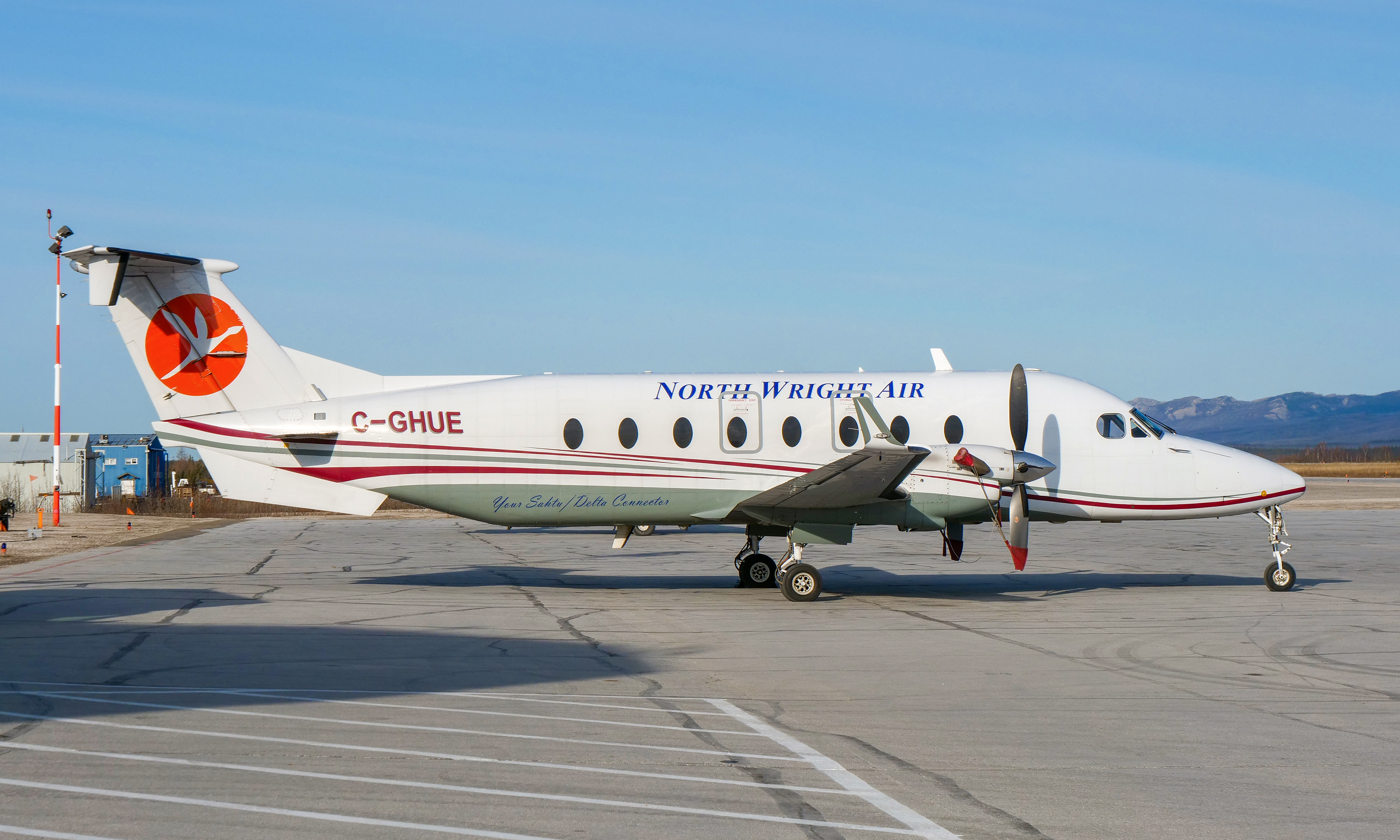
- North-Wright Airways Beechcraft 1900D ]
IATA	ICAO	Call sign
HW	NWL	NORTHWRIGHT
- Founded: 1986; 40 years ago
- AOC #: 5732
- Operating bases: Norman Wells Airport, Norman Wells Water Aerodrome
- Hubs: Norman Wells
- Focus cities: Inuvik
- Fleet size: 16, at least 11
- Destinations: 8
- Parent company: North Wright Air Limited
- Headquarters: Norman Wells, Northwest Territories
- Employees: 80
- Website: Official website

North-Wright Airways or North Wright Air is an airline based in Norman Wells, Northwest Territories, Canada. It operates commuter services to several communities in the Northwest Territories as well as charter services. Their main base is Norman Wells Airport and they also operate the Norman Wells Water Aerodrome which is used for floatplane operations.

== History ==
North-Wright Airways was established in 1986 and was previously known, since 1979, as Nahanni Air Services and North Wright Air.

== Destinations ==
As of July 2024, North-Wright Airways serves the following destinations:

- Aklavik (Aklavik/Freddie Carmichael Airport)
- Colville Lake (Colville Lake/Tommy Kochon Aerodrome)
- Deline (Déline Airport)
- Fort Good Hope (Fort Good Hope Airport)
- Inuvik (Inuvik (Mike Zubko) Airport)
- Norman Wells (Norman Wells Airport) - main base
- Tulita (Tulita Airport)
- Yellowknife (Yellowknife Airport)

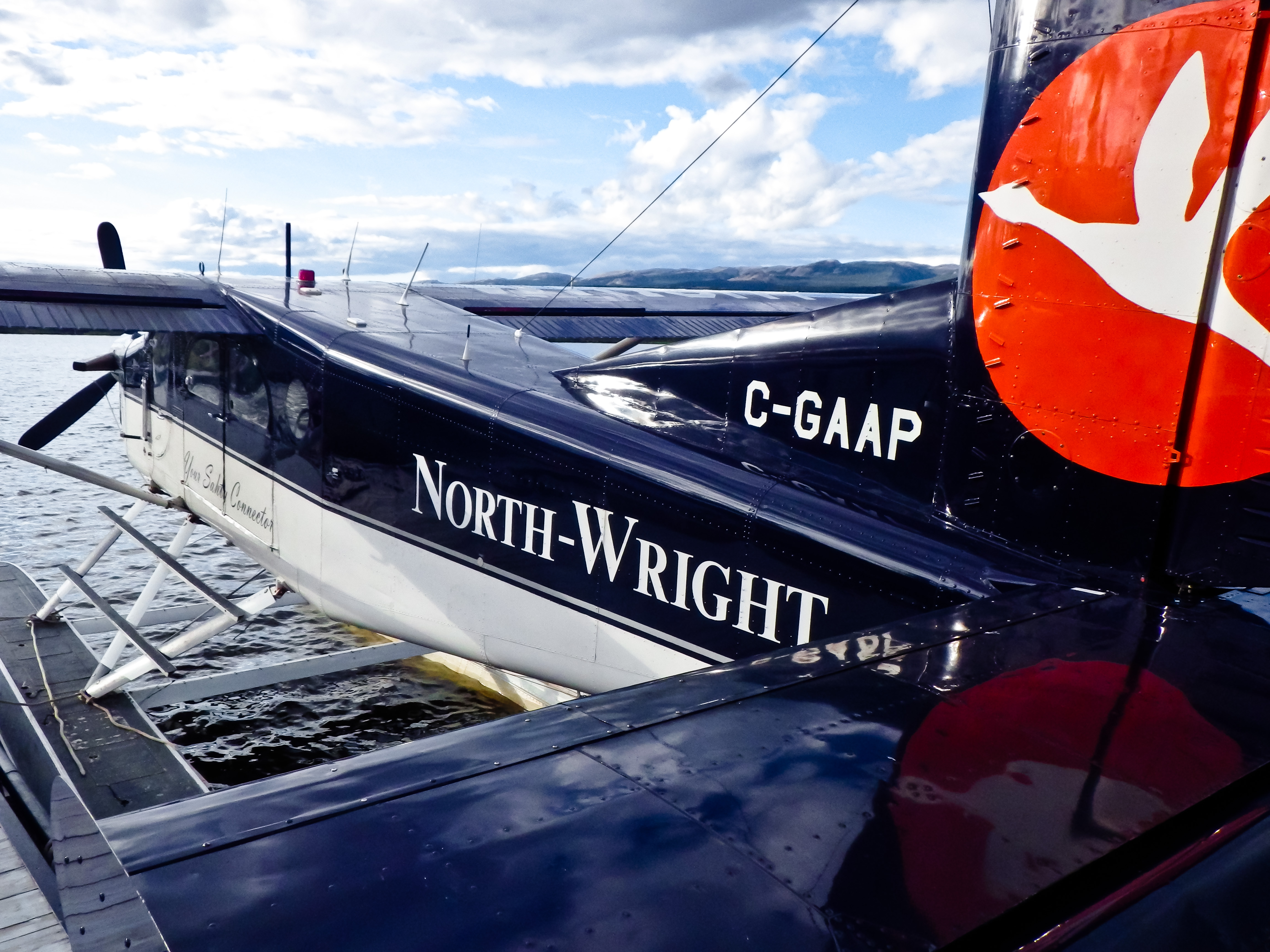
A Pilatus PC-6 Porter

== Fleet ==
As of July 2024, North-Wright operates at least nine aircraft and has sixteen registered with Transport Canada:

North-Wright Airways
Aircraft	No. of aircraft TC	No. of aircraft NWL	Variants	Notes
Beechcraft 1900	4	5	1900D	Up to 19 passengers
Cessna 185	1	—	185F	3 passengers, float and ski capable, not listed at North-Wright site
Cessna 206	2	n/a	U206 (F (Stationair), G (Stationair))	5 passengers ski/floats
Cessna 207	2	n/a	207A Skywagon/Stationair 8	5 or 6 passengers
Cessna 208 Grand Caravan	2	2	208B	9 passengers, scheduled service
de Havilland Canada DHC-6 Twin Otter	3	2	1 – Series 100; 1 – Series 300	16 to 18 passengers
Helio Courier	1	—	H-295	4 passengers, tundra tyres or wheel/skis, not listed at North-Wright site
Pilatus PC-6 Porter	1	1	PC-6/B-H2	Up to 10 passengers
Total	16	At least 11		

Several of the above aircraft types can be configured for floatplane operations from lakes or rivers in addition to being operated as landplanes using conventional runways or airstrips.

== Accidents ==
- On 16 August 2006, a Cessna 337, C-FWHP, was flying from Fort Good Hope Airport to Norman Wells with one pilot and five passengers. The wreckage was found about 26 NM (48 km; 30 mi) east of Fort Good Hope. All passengers and the pilot died.
- On 20 May 2010, the wing of a Cessna 207, that was flying at a low altitude at Fort Good Hope Airport hit another North-Wright pilot. The pilot on the ground, William Bleach, who was filming at the time, died three days later. Parker James Butterfield, who was flying the C207, was sentenced to nine months and suspended from flying for two years.
