= Wolverine Air =

- Founded: 1972
- Hubs: Fort Simpson Island Airport
- Fleet size: 5
- Parent company: Wolverine Air (1988) Ltd
- Headquarters: Fort Simpson, Northwest Territories, Canada
- Key people: Laverna Martel
- Website: http://209.160.2.171/about_us.html

Wolverine Air is a charter airline operating out of Fort Simpson, Northwest Territories, Canada. It operates ecotourism flights and government contract flights such as fire patrols in the summer. It also supports the search and extraction of natural resources in the area.

== History ==
Founded in 1972, the airline has since grown to include six aircraft including a recently purchased BN-2A Islander.

== Fleet ==
As of August 2020 the Wolverine Air fleet includes four aircraft:

- 1 Cessna 172S
- 1 Cessna A185E
- 1 Cessna U206G
- 1 Britten Norman BN.2A-26
