= Fort Simpson Airport =

Airport in the Northwest Territories, Canada

- IATA: YFS; ICAO: CYFS; WMO: 71946

Summary
- Operator: Government of the Northwest Territories
- Location: Fort Simpson, Northwest Territories
- Time zone: Northwest Territories Time (UTC−06:00)
- Elevation AMSL: 556 ft (169 m)
- Coordinates: 61°45′37″N 121°14′12″W

Map
- Location in the Northwest Territories CYS (Canada)

Runways
Direction	Length		Surface
Direction	ft	m	Surface
14/32	6,000	1,829	Asphalt

Statistics (2010)
- Aircraft movements: 2,373
- Sources: Canada Flight Supplement; Environment Canada; Movements from Statistics Canada.

Fort Simpson Airport (IATA: YFS, ICAO: CYFS) is located 7.4 nautical miles (13.7 km; 8.5 mi) east southeast of Fort Simpson, Northwest Territories, Canada.

== Airlines and destinations ==
Airlines	Destinations
Air Tindi	Yellowknife
Canadian North	Hay River, Yellowknife

== Accidents and incidents ==
- On 26 June 1994, Douglas C-47A C-FROD of Buffalo Airways crashed on approach due to fuel exhaustion. The aircraft was on a cargo flight from Trout Lake Airport. There were two crews on board at that time. There were no fatalities but the aircraft was written off.

== See also ==
- List of airports in the Fort Simpson area
