= Gamètì/Rae Lakes Airport =

Gamèti/Rae Lakes Airport
- IATA: YRA; ICAO: CYRA; WMO: 71165

Summary
- Airport type: Public
- Operator: Government of Northwest Territories
- Location: Gamèti, Northwest Territories
- Time zone: Northwest Territories Time (UTC−06:00)
- Elevation AMSL: 724 ft (221 m)
- Coordinates: 64°06′58″N 117°18′35″W

Map
- Location in the Northwest Territories

Runways
Direction	Length		Surface
Direction	ft	m	Surface
14/32	3,000	914	Gravel

Statistics (2010)
- Aircraft movements: 1,218
- Sources: Canada Flight Supplement; Environment Canada; Movements from Statistics Canada

Gamètì/Rae Lakes Airport (IATA: YRA, ICAO: CYRA) is located at Gamèti, Northwest Territories, Canada. Barren-ground caribou may be found on the runway. The airport has a small terminal building.

== Airlines and destinations ==
Airlines	Destinations
Air Tindi	Yellowknife
