= List of airports in the Fort Simpson area =

Location in the Northwest Territories

The following active airports serve the area around Fort Simpson, Northwest Territories, Canada:

Airport name	ICAO/TC LID/IATA	Location	Coordinates
Fort Simpson Airport	CYFS (YFS)	Fort Simpson	61°45′37″N 121°14′11″W
Fort Simpson/(Great Slave No. 1) Heliport	CFS2	Fort Simpson	61°50′18″N 121°19′35″W
Fort Simpson (Great Slave No. 2) Heliport	CFD8	Fort Simpson	61°50′12″N 121°19′30″W
Fort Simpson Island Airport	CET4	Fort Simpson	61°52′00″N 121°21′58″W
Fort Simpson Island Water Aerodrome	CEZ7	Fort Simpson	61°52′00″N 121°22′00″W

== See also ==
- List of airports in the Northwest Territories
