= Hay River/Merlyn Carter Airport =

Public airport in Northwest Territories, Canada

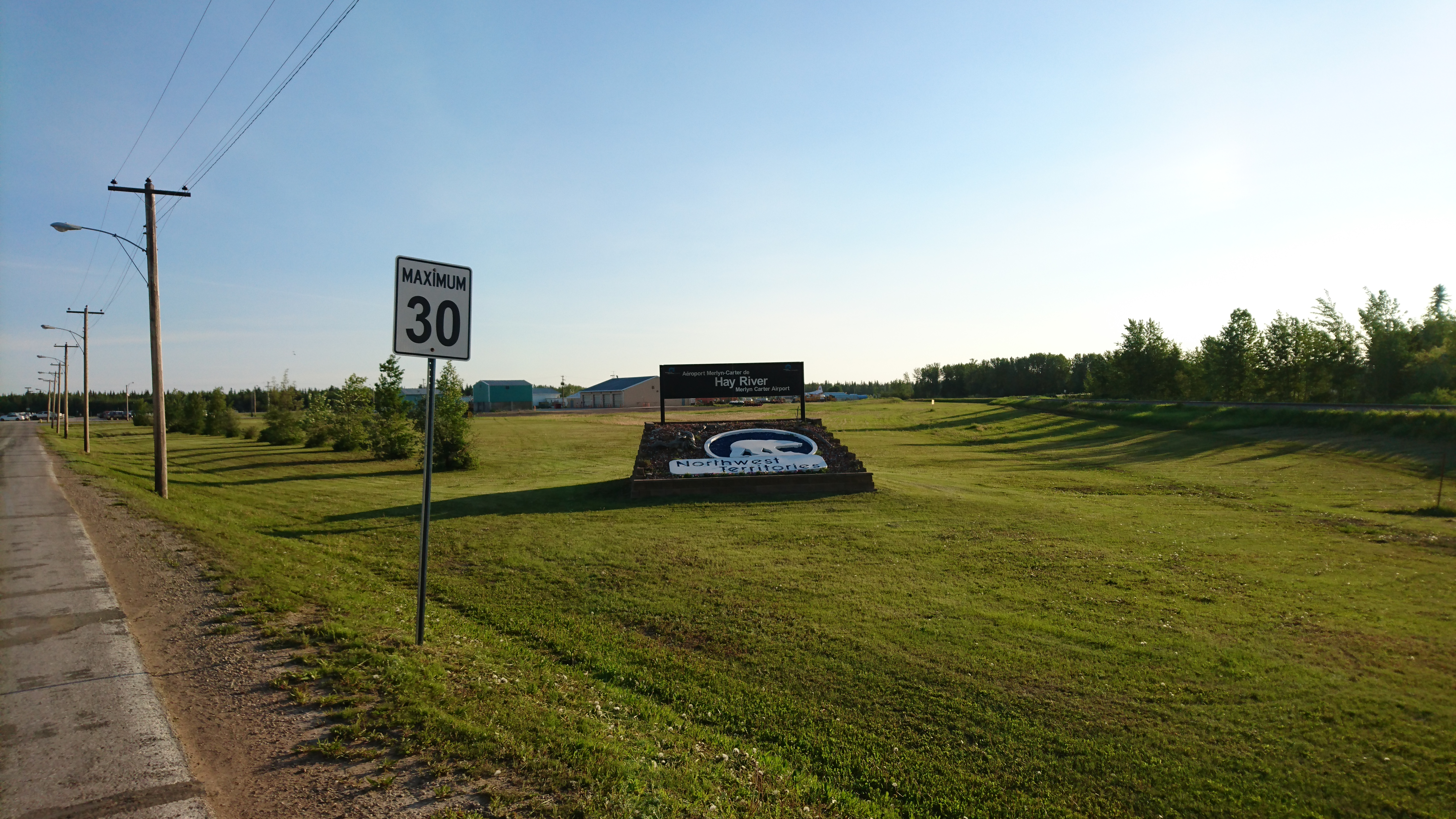
- Hay River Airport sign

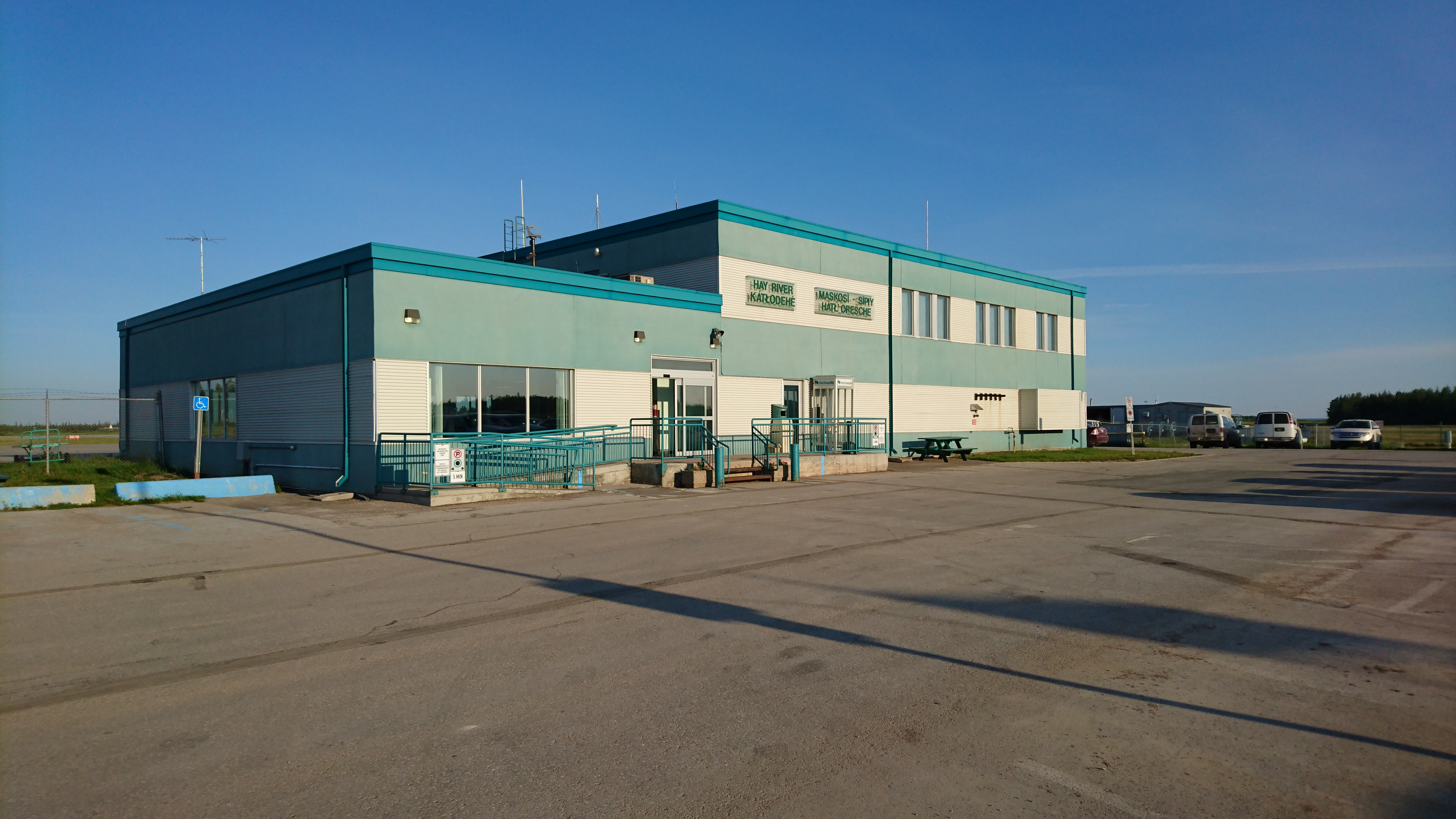
- Airport terminal
- IATA: YHY; ICAO: CYHY; WMO: 71935

Summary
- Airport type: Public
- Operator: Government of the Northwest Territories
- Location: Hay River, Northwest Territories
- Time zone: Northwest Territories Time (UTC−06:00)
- Elevation AMSL: 541 ft (165 m)
- Coordinates: 60°50′23″N 115°46′58″W

Map
- Location in the Northwest Territories CYHY (Canada)

Runways
Direction	Length		Surface
Direction	ft	m	Surface
14/32	6,000	1,829	Asphalt
05/23	4,001	1,220	Gravel/asphalt

Statistics (2010)
- Aircraft movements: 5,012
- Sources: Canada Flight Supplement; Environment Canada; Movements from Statistics Canada

Hay River/Merlyn Carter Airport (IATA: YHY, ICAO: CYHY) is located 1.5 nautical miles (2.8 km; 1.7 mi) north of Hay River, Northwest Territories, Canada.

The airport is named for former bush pilot Merlyn Carter, who was killed by a black bear in 2005.

Sandhill cranes may be found nesting on the airport from May until September.

== Airlines and destinations ==
Airlines	Destinations
Air Tindi	Edmonton, Fort Smith, Yellowknife
Canadian North	Yellowknife

=== Cargo ===
Airlines	Destinations
Buffalo Airways	Yellowknife

== See also ==
- Hay River Water Aerodrome
- Hay River/Brabant Lodge Water Aerodrome
