= Yellowknife Fire Department =

Fire division in Northwest Territories, Canada

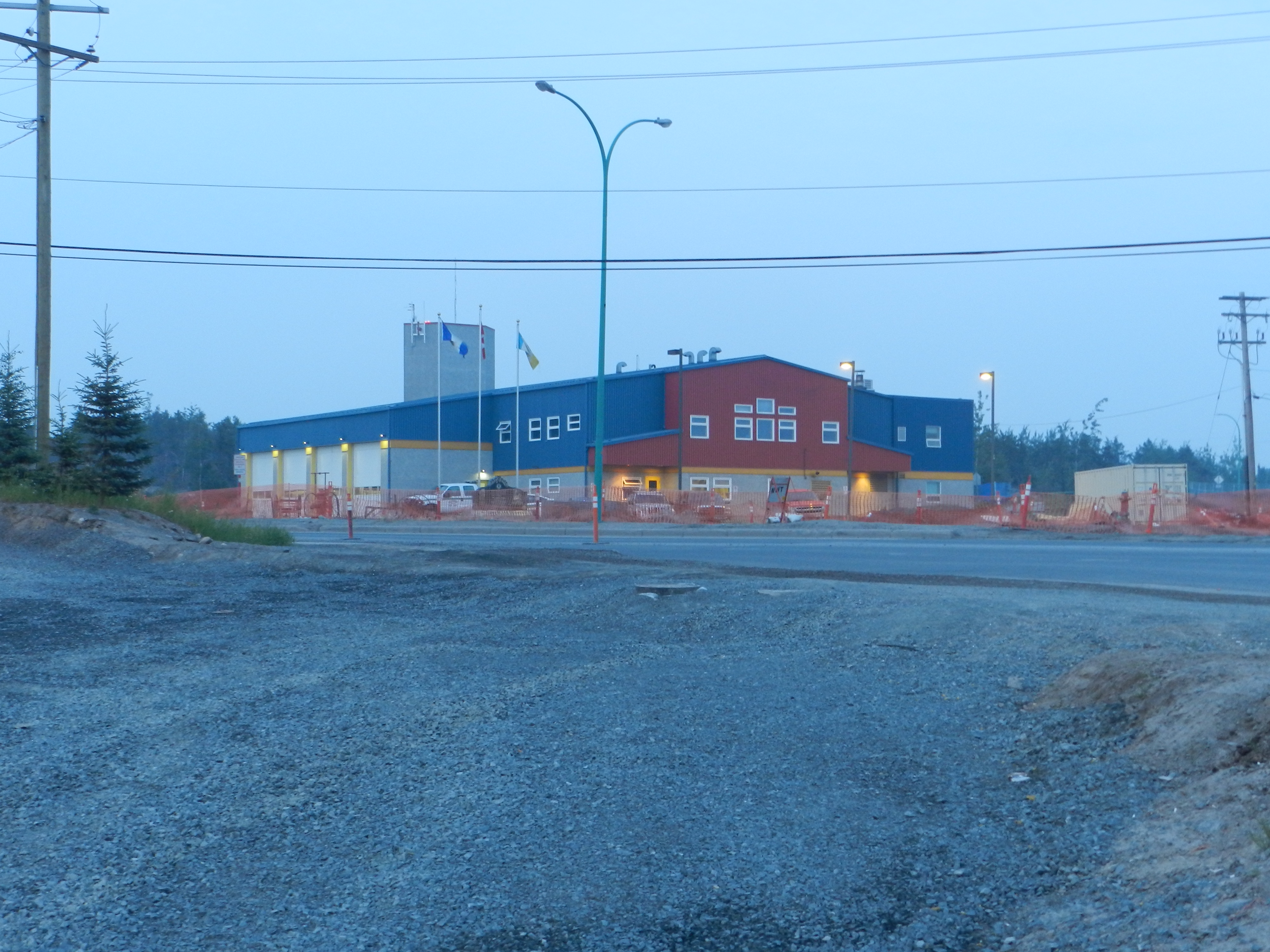

Operational area
- Country: Canada
- Territory: Northwest Territories
- City: Yellowknife
- Address: 100 Taylor Road
- Coordinates: 62°26′32″N 114°23′45″W

Agency overview
- Established: 1943
- Annual calls: 5,000 (approximately)
- Employees: 39
- Staffing: Full-time
- Fire chief: Rob Andrews (acting)
- EMS level: EMT Transport

Facilities and equipment
- Stations: 1
- Engines: 2
- Rescues: 1
- Tenders: 2
- USAR: 1

Website
- https://www.yellowknife.ca/en/living-here/fire-division.aspx#

Yellowknife Fire Division is a full-time fire department located in Yellowknife, Northwest Territories, Canada with full-time firefighters. The department was established in February 1943. Their staff consists of a fire chief, two deputy chiefs, and thirty-six full-time members, composed of four captains, four lieutenants and twenty-eight firefighters. They operate on a four-platoon system that consists of eight staff.

In 2022, the department responded to 5,982 calls, down 28.9 per cent from the average of 7,712 between 2017 and 2021. The services provided incorporate public education initiatives, fire inspections, preplanning, fire suppression, emergency medical response and additional specialized services in auto extrication, hazmat, confined space, water/ice rescue. The Fire Department provides important emergency services to the citizens of Yellowknife and the surrounding area.

According to the Yellowknife Fire Division the following are the minimum requirements to join:

- National Fire Protection Association (NFPA) 1001 Level 2
- Emergency Medical Technician (EMT) or Primary Care Paramedic (PCP)
- Cardio Pulmonary Resuscitation (CPR) Level C
- International Trauma Life Support (ITLS) Adult
- International Trauma Life Support (ITLS) Pediatric
- Northwest Territories Class 3 Driver's License with Air Brake Endorsement
- Physically fit with the ability to pass the Candidate Physical Ability Test (CPAT)
- The ability to positively interact with team members and the community we serve

— Yellowknife Fire Division

As of November 2023, the chief is Nelson Johnson, deputy chief of operations is Rob Andrews, and deputy chief of safety and training is Seann May.
