= Tulita Airport =

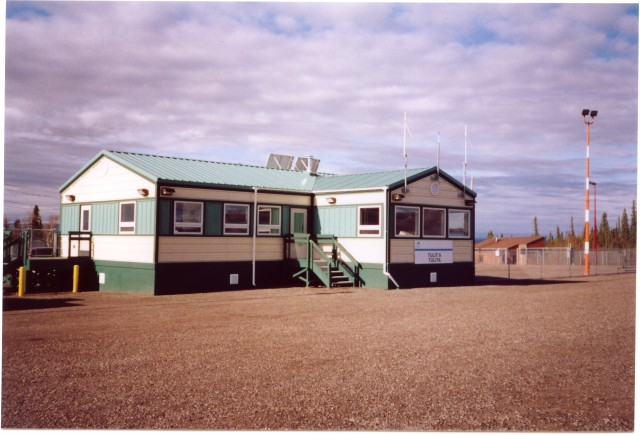
- IATA: ZFN; ICAO: CZFN

Summary
- Airport type: Public
- Operator: Government of the Northwest Territories
- Location: Tulita, Northwest Territories
- Time zone: Northwest Territories Time (UTC−06:00)
- Elevation AMSL: 329 ft (100 m)
- Coordinates: 64°54′35″N 125°34′10″W

Map
- Location in the Northwest Territories

Runways
Direction	Length		Surface
Direction	ft	m	Surface
06/24	3,935	1,199	Gravel

Statistics (2010)
- Aircraft movements: 2,291
- Source: Canada Flight Supplement; Movements from Statistics Canada

Tulita Airport (IATA: ZFN, ICAO: CZFN) is located adjacent to Tulita, Northwest Territories, Canada. Its hours of operation are Monday to Friday from 9 am to 5 pm. The airport does operate outside of its operational hours when responding to MEDIVAC (air ambulance) call out.

== Airlines and destinations ==
Airlines	Destinations
North-Wright Airways	Déline, Fort Good Hope, Norman Wells

=== Cargo ===
Airlines	Destinations
Buffalo Airways	Yellowknife
