= Buffalo Airways =

Airline based in Yellowknife, Canada

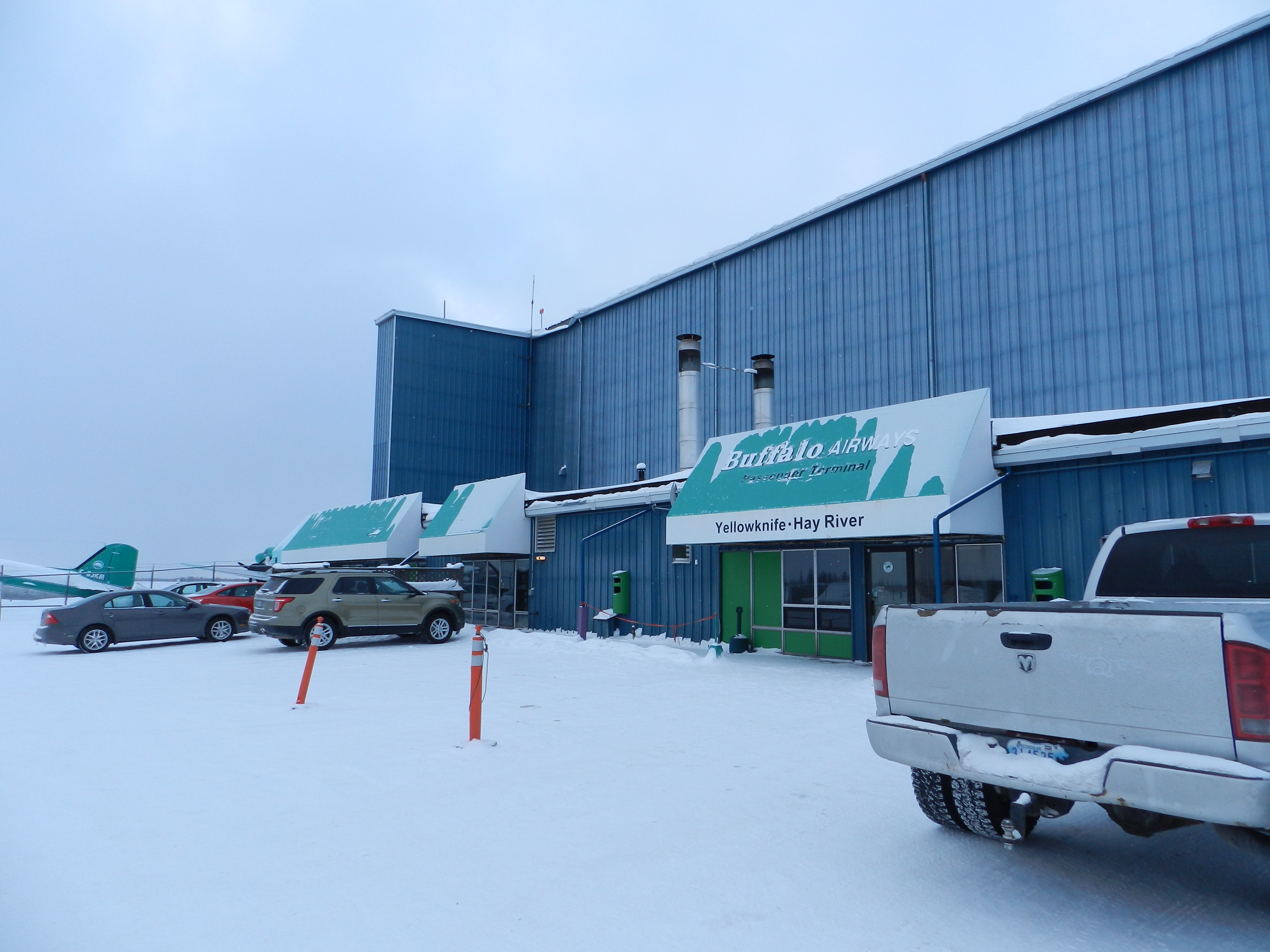
- Yellowknife base of Buffalo Air
| IATA | ICAO | Call sign |
|---|---|---|
| J0 | BFL | BUFFALO |
- Founded: 13 May 1970
- AOC #: 5319
- Hubs: Yellowknife Airport
- Secondary hubs: Hay River/Merlyn Carter Airport
- Fleet size: 67 (64 + 2 + 1)
- Parent company: Buffalo Airways Limited
- Headquarters: Hay River, Northwest Territories, Canada
- Key people: Joe McBryan (President)
- Website: www.buffaloairways.com

Buffalo Airways is a family-run airline based in Yellowknife, Northwest Territories, Canada, established in 1970. Buffalo Airways was launched by Bob Gauchie and later sold to one of his pilots, Joe McBryan (aka "Buffalo Joe"). It operates charter passenger, charter cargo, firefighting, and fuel services, and it formerly operated scheduled passenger service. Its main base is at Yellowknife Airport, with two other bases at Hay River/Merlyn Carter Airport and Red Deer Regional Airport. The Red Deer base is the main storage and maintenance facility. The airline was also the subject of the History television reality series Ice Pilots NWT.

== Clothing company, television show, and media ==
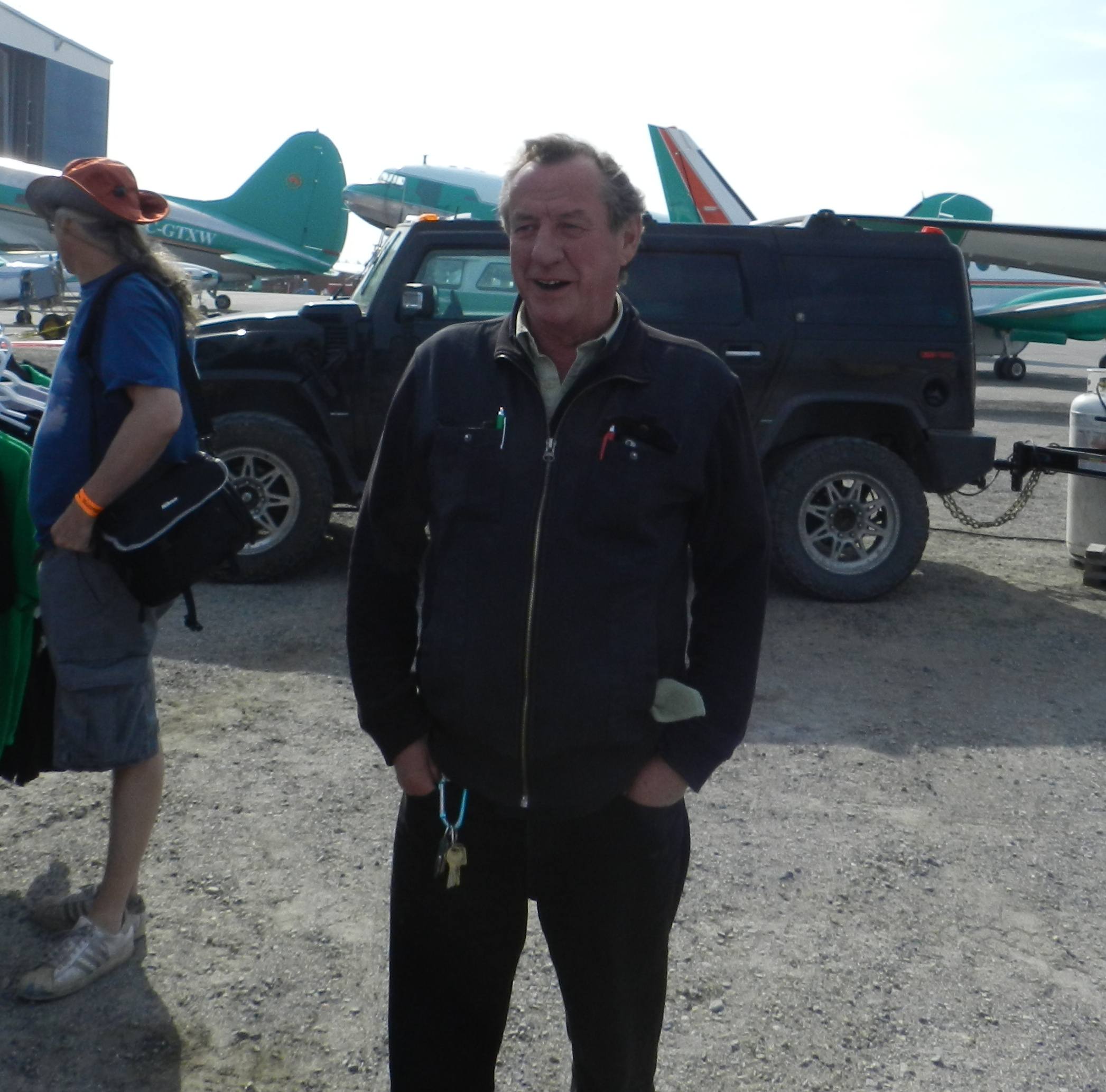
Joe McBryan (aka "Buffalo Joe")

In 2007, Buffalo Airways began producing a clothing line that included T-shirts, hoodies, and hats. With the introduction of the Canwest Global (now Shaw Media) television show Ice Pilots NWT, Buffalo has expanded its clothing company to feature over 30 products and launched a full-service product website called BuffaloAirWear.com. The show, which was produced by Omnifilm Entertainment and previously shown on History, features the day-to-day operations at Buffalo Airways.

In 2011, Buffalo Airways was involved in a recreation of the historic Dam Busters raids of World War II, flying the mission, with their own plane and pilots. Buffalo dropped an inert reproduction of the 'Upkeep' bouncing bomb from their Douglas DC-4. The project was documented in the television show Dambusters Fly Again in Canada, Dambusters: Building the Bouncing Bomb in the United Kingdom, and Nova season 39 episode "Bombing Hitler's Dams" in the United States. A behind-the-scenes look was also filmed in the Ice Pilots NWT season 3 episode 2 show "Dambusters".

In 2012, according to Buffalo Air, Arctic Air, a Canadian aviation drama, used Buffalo Airways hangar as a backdrop for scenes in the show. During a tour of Buffalo Airways' hangar, given by Director of Operations, Mikey McBryan, he explained how the TV show used tarps to cover the Buffalo Airways insignia.

On 27 July 2012, Bruce Dickinson, lead singer of Iron Maiden, flew up from Edmonton to Yellowknife with Buffalo Airways. On 28 July, Dickinson, who holds an airline transport pilot licence, flew a Douglas DC-3 to Yellowknife and spent a day as a guest star for a season five episode.

In August 2019, owner Joe McBryan was made a member of the Order of the Northwest Territories to honour his work in aviation.

== Buffalo Air Express ==
Buffalo operates a courier service as Buffalo Air Express which started in 1982–1983 by shipping cargo by truck to Hay River and flown into Yellowknife. It offers service throughout the Northwest Territories (NWT) and Northern Alberta. In association with Global Interline Network it can ship around the world from bases in Yellowknife, Edmonton and Hay River. In 2023, it launched the first dedicated direct cargo route between Edmonton and Yellowknife on its newly acquired Boeing 737-300SF to meet the demands of next-day freight delivery.

== Firefighting ==
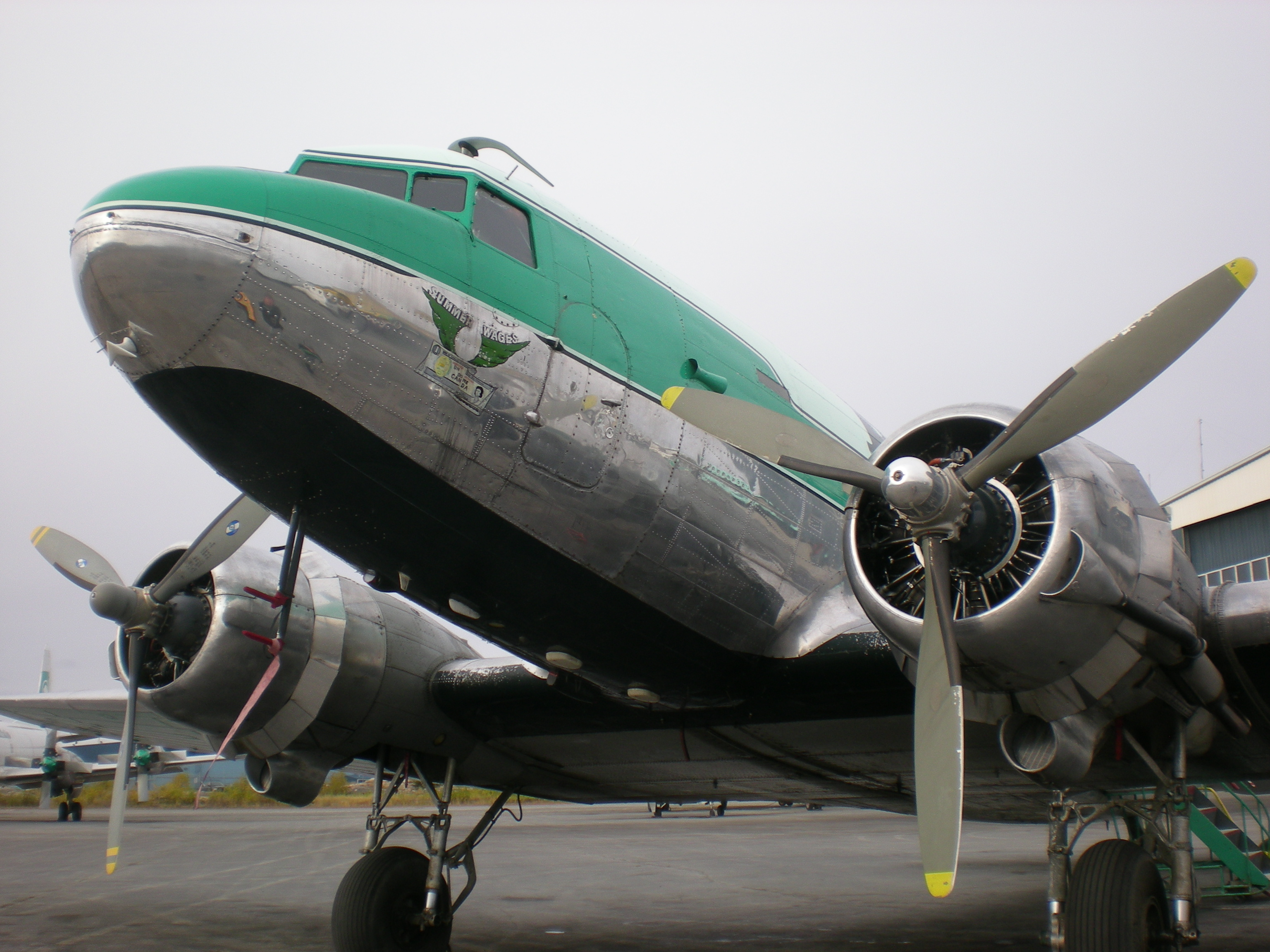
The first DC-3 bought by "Buffalo Joe"

Under contract for the NWT Government, Buffalo Airways operate and maintain aircraft used in the aerial firefighting program. Aircraft include both bird dog and waterbombers. The waterbombers are assisted by smaller aircraft known as "bird dogs" which are used to help spot wildfires as well as guide waterbombers during operations.

Current water bomber aircraft include eight amphibious Air Tractor 802 Fireboss and two specially converted Lockheed L-188 Electra. Bird Dog aircraft include the Gulfstream/Rockwell 690, and the Beech King Air.

Former aircraft used include the amphibious Canadair CL-215, the Douglas C-54/DC-4, and the Canso PBY-5.

== Buffalo School of Aviation ==
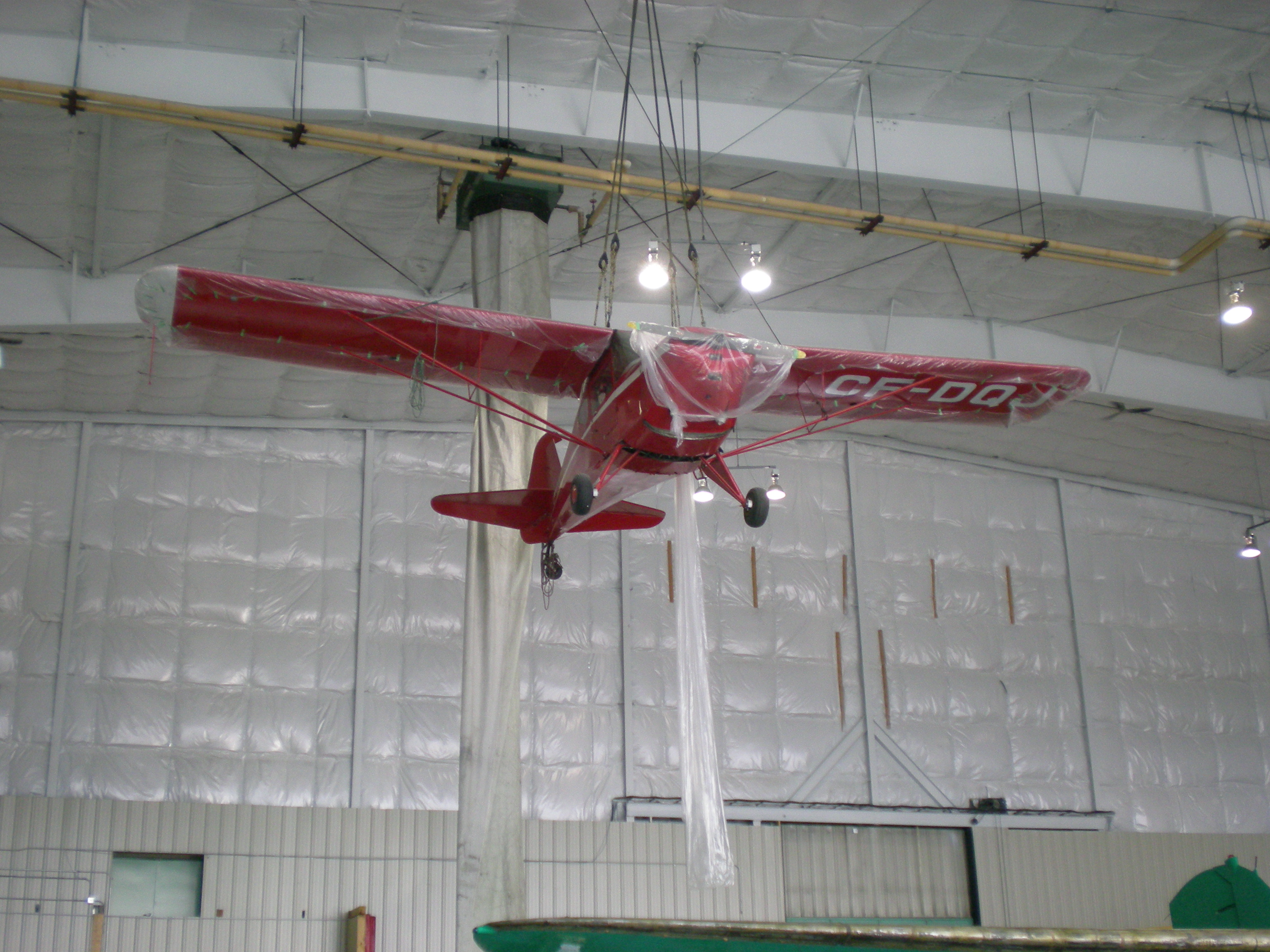
Buffalo School of Aviation's Fleet Canuck

Buffalo's aviation school offers an aircraft maintenance engineer program and several other courses. According to Transport Canada listings, the school has three aircraft: two are single-engine fixed wing airplanes, an Aeronca Champion and a Fleet 80 Canuck, and the third is a Robinson R22 helicopter. The Buffalo website also lists a Bell 206 helicopter and a Beech 90 King Air.

== Destinations ==
The airline operated scheduled passenger services between Hay River and Yellowknife from August 1986 until November 2015. However, due to the suspension of its Air Operator Certificate, scheduled service was replaced in December 2015, when the company chartered aircraft to make the run. The charter service was cancelled on 24 December.

As of Spring 2019, Buffalo has not resumed passenger service and currently does not have trained flight attendants, making passenger service unlikely in the near future. The airline carried over 186,000 passengers from 1986 to 2015. The route was taken over by Canadian North

Scheduled cargo services transport supplies from Yellowknife to Délı̨nę, Fort Good Hope, Norman Wells, and Tulita under contract with the Government of the Northwest Territories. The service also includes an airport shuttle and a medical transfer bus. Buffalo also offers charters on their passenger aircraft across Canada in addition to cargo charters.

== Fleet ==
According to Transport Canada, as of 5 September 2026, Buffalo Airways' fleet numbered sixty-four, with an additional two aircraft registered to the Buffalo School of Aviation, as well as the United States Federal Aviation Administration having one aircraft registered to Buffalo Airways USA. In 2023, Buffalo purchased their second jet aircraft, a Boeing 737 (registered as GTVO) from Chrono Aviation. The Boeing 737-200 series is a combi aircraft has the gravel kit, engine hush kit and LPV. McBryan states that they are looking at converting the aircraft to full cargo.

Buffalo Airways fleet
| Aircraft | No. of aircraft | Variants | Notes |
|---|---|---|---|
| Air Tractor AT-802 | 10 | 2 - AT-802; 8 - AT-802A | |
| Beechcraft Baron | 2 | 1 - 95-C55; 1 - D55 | Bird dog, used to spot fires and guide waterbombers |
| Beechcraft 1900 | 1 | 1900D | |
| Beechcraft King Air | 8 | 3 - 90 Series; 5 - 2 - 100 & 3 - A100 | Bird dog |
| Boeing 737 | 1 | 737-200 | Purchased from Chrono Aviation |
| Boeing 737 | 1 | 737-300 | |
| Canadair CL-215 | 7 | | Waterbombers |
| Cessna 185 | 1 | 185E/A185E Skywagon | |
| Cessna 310 | 1 | 310Q | |
| Convair CV-340 | 1 | CV-340 | Not listed at Buffalo website |
| Curtiss-Wright C-46 Commando | 2 | 1 - C-46D; 1 - C-46F | Cargo |
| de Havilland Twin Otter | 1 | DHC-6 Series 200 | |
| Douglas C-47 Skytrain | 1 | C-47A | Passenger / cargo / combi, wheels and wheel skis, not listed at Buffalo web site |
| Douglas C-54 Skymaster | 11 | 2 - C-54A; 3 - C-54E; 6 - C-54G | Formerly used for cargo and aerial firefighting. Retired in favour of using Electras. As of March 2024, eleven were listed for sale by Buffalo. |
| Douglas DC-3 | 5 | 1 - DC-3C; 4 - DC3C-S1C3G | Passenger / cargo / combi. Wheels and wheel skis. |
| Fleet 80 Canuck | 1 | | Buffalo School of Aviation, aircraft returned to flying condition in the summer of 2020. |
| Gulfstream 690 / Rockwell 690 | 2 | 690C | Bird Dog. Not listed at Buffalo web site |
| Lockheed L-188 Electra | 9 | 3 - L-188A; 6 - L-188C | Cargo and bulk fuel transport as well as aerial firefighting (waterbombers). Last airline to transport cargo with this plane. |
| Lockheed P-3 Orion | 1 | P-3A | Waterbomber; Buffalo Airways USA Inc - N922AU. As of May 2019 operated by AirSpray in California. |
| Robinson R22 | 1 | R22 Beta | Buffalo School of Aviation, helicopter |
| Total | 67 | | |

Reports show that Buffalo owns a Douglas DC-6, a Swingtail DC-6, and the only one of the two made that still survives. It was bought by Buffalo Airways.

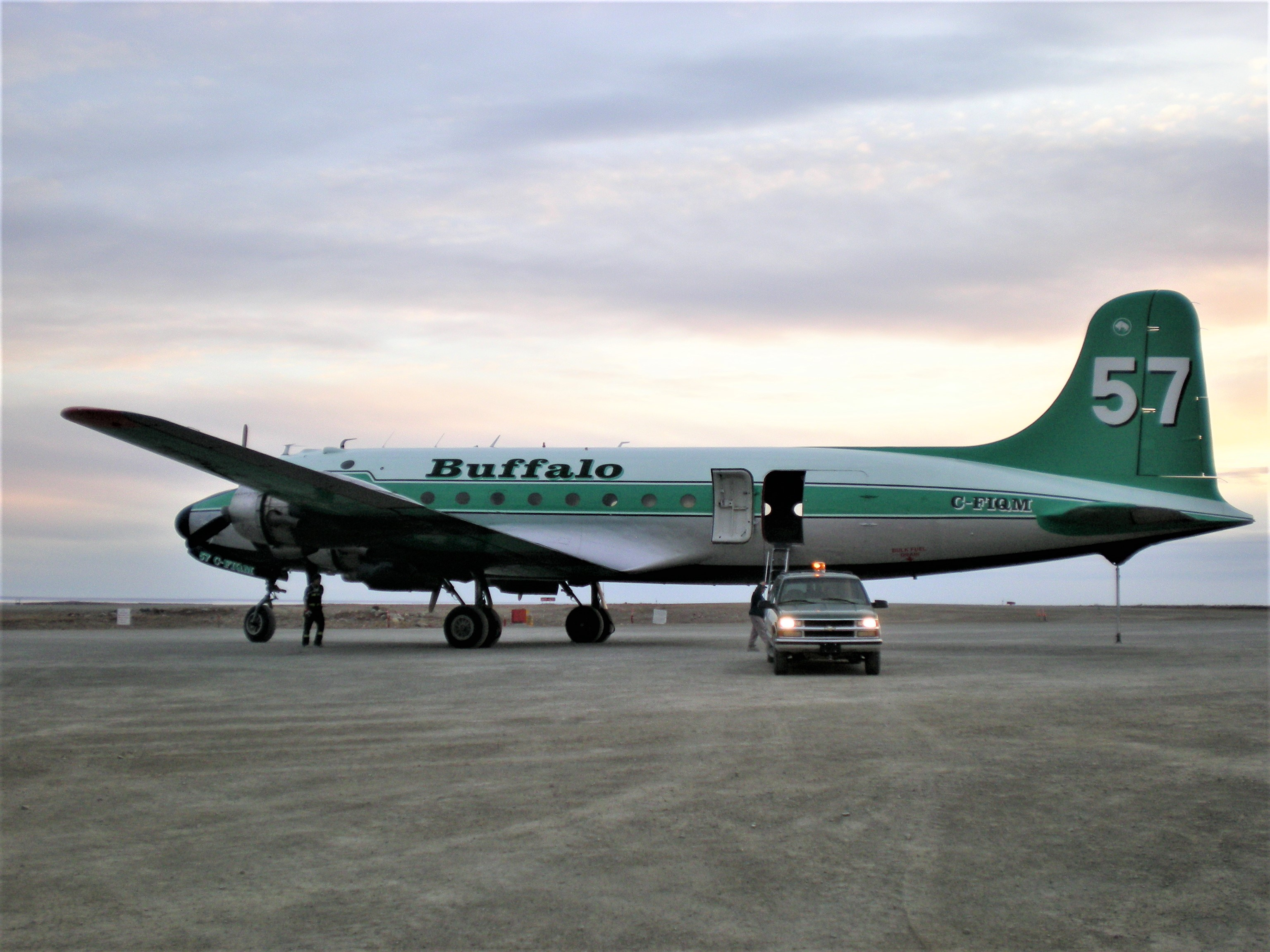
Buffalo Airways C-54 (DC-4) unloading at Cambridge Bay Airport

=== KG330 (C-GWZS) ===
This Buffalo Airways DC-3 flew on D-Day dropping paratroopers over Normandy as part of 512 Squadron. KG330 left RAF Broadwell for Operation Tonga at precisely 23:15. It would have been part of 'C' flight as it crossed the English Channel towards its drop zone. The exact location for the drop was 4.8 km (3 mi) inland between Cabourg and Ouistreham, just north of the heavily defended city of Caen. It would be dropping the 9th Parachute Battalion as part of the 6th Airborne Division. The paratroopers the plane dropped were sent to destroy a heavy coastal battery and to position themselves on the canal between Caen and the port at Ouistreham. The coastal defence had earlier been successfully bombed by 100 Avro Lancaster bombers of RAF Bomber Command. No casualties were reported, and the aircraft returned to base at 03:35.

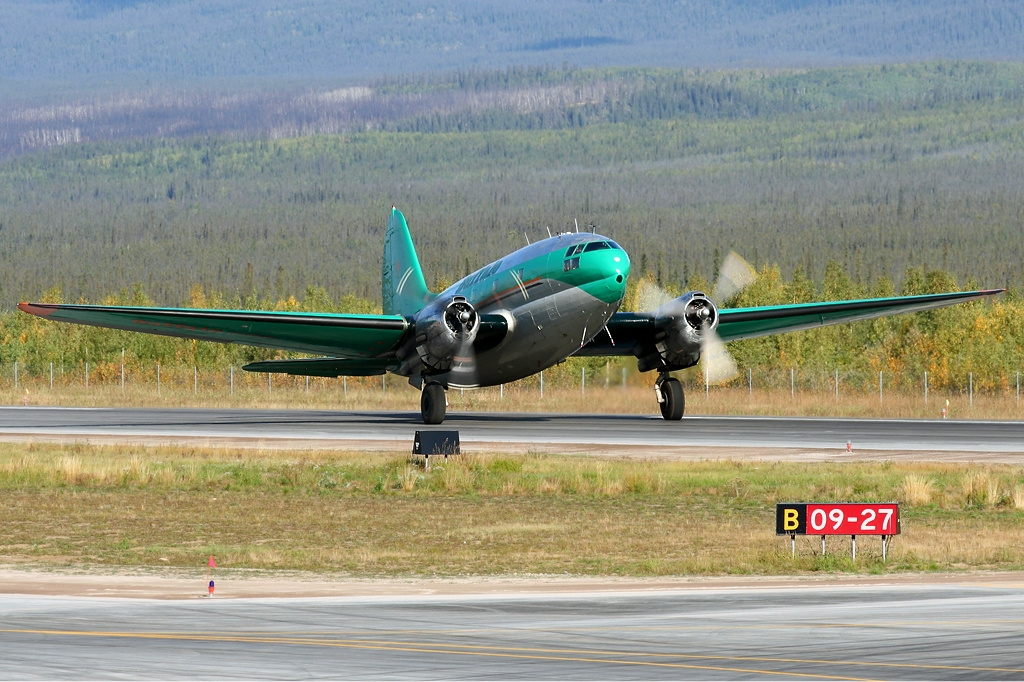
Former Buffalo Airways C-GTXW C-46A at Norman Wells Airport

== Air Operator Certificate ==
On 30 November 2015, Transport Canada suspended Buffalo Airways' Air Operator Certificate, citing the airline's poor safety record. This prohibited Buffalo Airways from operating commercial air services until it could prove that it is capable of meeting all safety regulations on a consistent basis. Service was maintained using chartered aircraft. On 12 January 2016, the license was reinstated.

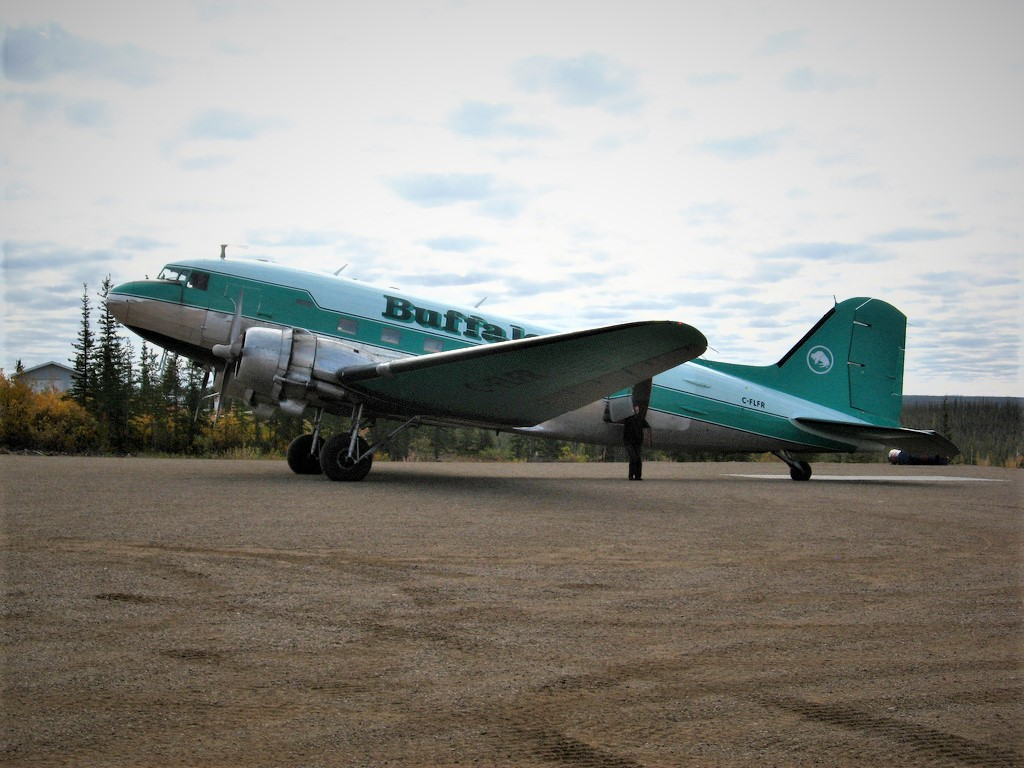
A Douglas DC-3 at Colville Lake/Tommy Kochon Aerodrome

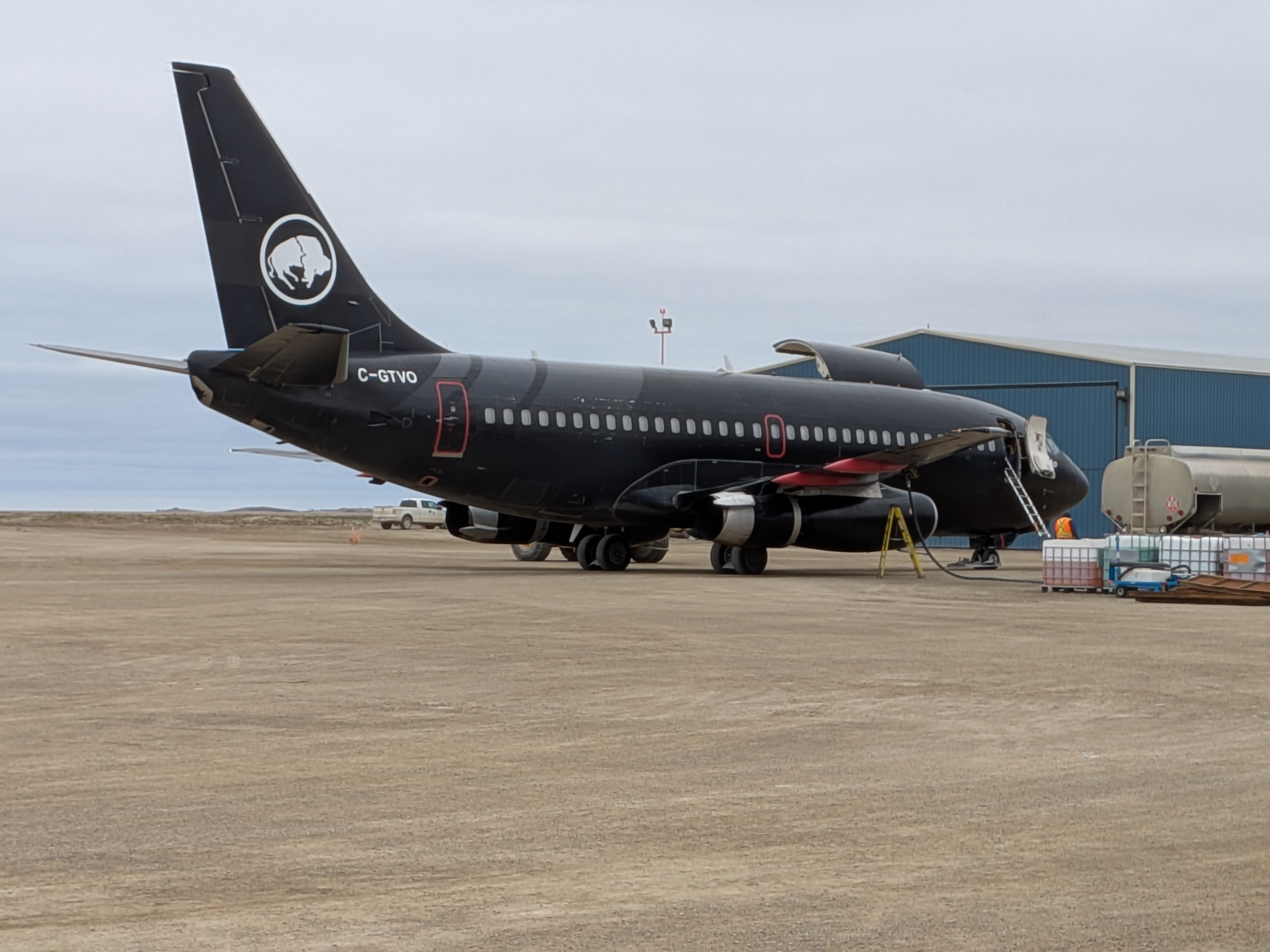
A Boeing 737-200 operated by Buffalo Air

== Accidents and incidents ==
- On 26 June 1994, flight BFL526, a Douglas C-47A (C-FROD), crashed on approach to Fort Simpson Airport, Northwest Territories due to fuel exhaustion. The aircraft was on a cargo flight from Sambaa K'e Aerodrome (then called Trout Lake). There were two crew on board at the time; both were injured and the aircraft was a write-off.
- On 24 July 2001, flight TANKER602, a Consolidated PBY-5A Canso (C-FNJE) caught a wing tip in Sitidgi Lake (about 25 nautical miles (46 km; 29 mi) north of Inuvik) while fire fighting and crashed into the lake. Another aircraft landed on the lake and picked up the two crew. The aircraft was pulled out of the water; the engines and other valuable parts removed. The hull, which was left at the lake, was later retrieved by Fairview Aircraft Restorations Society and taken to Fairview, Alberta, where it is undergoing restoration.
- On 28 August 2002, flight BFL928, a Douglas C-54E (C-GQIC), landed short of the runway at Diavik Airport. The right wing came off the aircraft, which travelled 1,000 ft (300 m) down the runway. The aircraft caught fire and was a write-off. The two crew escaped with minor injuries.
- On 1 August 2003, a Douglas C-54G (C-GBSK) touched down short of the runway at the Ulu mine strip. The landing gear collapsed and the wings separated from the fuselage. The wings then caught fire and the fuselage veered off the right side of the runway. The four crew were unhurt, but the aircraft was written off.
- On 25 May 2004, flight BFL326, a loaded Curtiss C-46D (C-FAVO), was seriously damaged at Yellowknife Airport while taxiing for departure. The company reported the tail wheel went off the threshold of runway 09 (now runway 10) while turning to align with the active runway for take-off, sinking into a soft gravel area in a 90° position from centreline. The crew applied power to try and free the stuck aircraft which resulted in a sideways loading of the tailwheel bulkhead at station 720, causing structural failure at the tail wheel to fuselage attachment points as well as buckling of the main fuselage between station 615 and 633. The incident caused the runway to remain closed for about six hours until the aircraft could be repaired sufficiently to allow safe removal. Although the aircraft was substantially damaged, it was subsequently repaired and returned to active service using a section cut from a derelict airframe of Everts Air Cargo Express, Fairbanks, Alaska; 42-96578 - N4860V
- On 5 January 2006, flight BFL1405, a Douglas C-54G (C-GXKN), had departed Norman Wells Airport when the number two engine caught fire and stopped. The crew attempted to put out the fire but were not successful. While feathering the number two propeller, number one also feathered, leaving them with only two engines. They returned to Norman Wells and performed an emergency landing, but the aircraft left the runway and ploughed through the snow. The four crew were unhurt, but the aircraft was written off and the nose was later used to repair another C-54. The fire was caused by a fuel leak.
- On 29 December 2006, flight BFL129, a Douglas C-54A (C-GPSH), suffered a nose gear collapse following a runway excursion while landing on an ice strip at Carat Lake near Jericho Diamond Mine. The aircraft's nose dropped over an embankment at the end of the runway, damaging the nose section. The aircraft was transporting 9,000 L (2,000 imp gal; 2,400 US gal) of diesel in fuel cells, and some of these broke loose, spilling some of the fuel. The nose section, which could not be salvaged, was repaired in July 2007 with the nose section from C-54 C-GXKN.
- On 24 June 2026, a Rockwell Turbo Commander 690, a bird dog aircraft #104, crashed near Fort Simpson during aerial firefighting duties. The crash resulted in three fatalities, including the Buffalo Airways pilot. The event is being investgated by the Transportation Safety Board of Canada (TSB).

== See also ==
- Flying Wild Alaska, a televesion series about Era Alaska, now Ravn Alaska
- Canadian North - operating the Yellowknife - Hay River service
