= Colville Lake/Tommy Kochon Aerodrome =

Aerodrome in the Northwest Territories, Canada

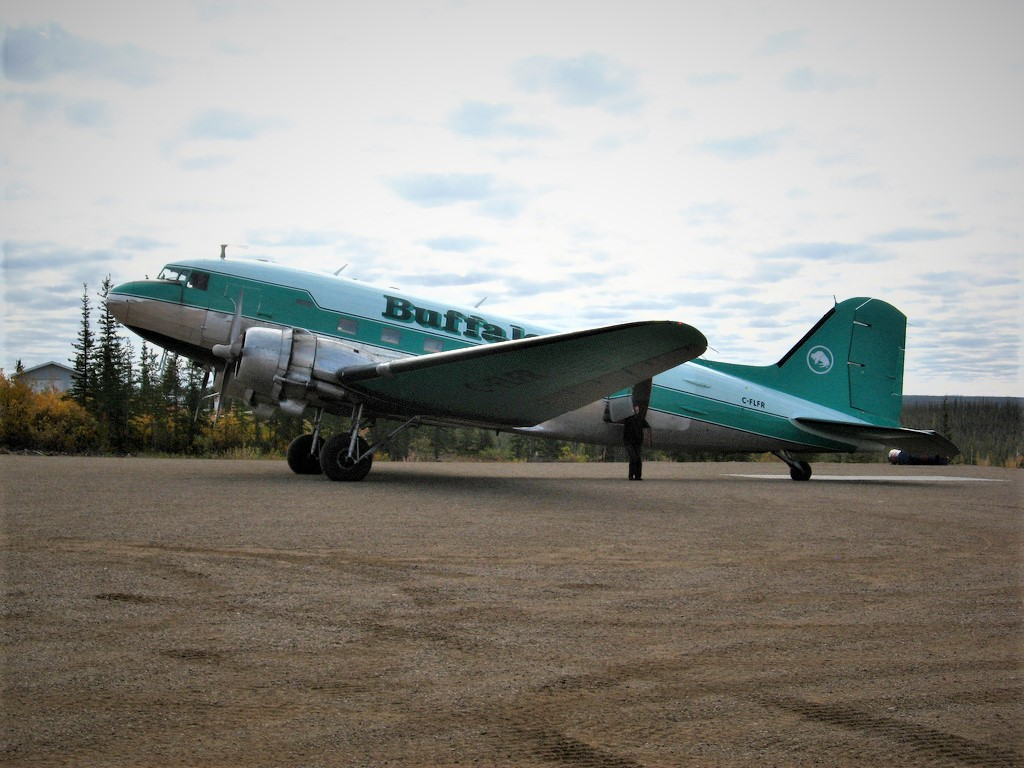
- IATA: YCK; ICAO: CYVL; WMO: 71055

Summary
- Airport type: Public
- Operator: Government of the Northwest Territories
- Location: Colville Lake, Northwest Territories
- Time zone: MST (UTC−07:00)
  - Summer (DST): MDT (UTC−06:00)
- Elevation AMSL: 899 ft / 274 m
- Coordinates: 67°01′16″N 126°07′43″W

Map
- Location in the Northwest Territories

Runways
Direction	Length		Surface
Direction	ft	m	Surface
17/35	3,935	1,199	Gravel
- Sources: Canada Flight Supplement; Environment Canada

Colville Lake/Tommy Kochon Aerodrome (IATA: YCK, ICAO: CYVL) is a registered aerodrome located next to Colville Lake, Northwest Territories, Canada. A new terminal, with a small waiting room, washrooms and land line phone, and a longer runway were opened in October 2012 at a cost of CA$12.8 million.

== History ==
Prior to 2012 the airport was located within Colville Lake and had a single 2,743 ft (836 m) gravel runway (10/28). In 2009 the demand for a longer runway to handle larger aircraft resulted in the relocation.

== Airlines and destinations ==
Airlines	Destinations
North-Wright Airways	Fort Good Hope, Norman Wells, Yellowknife

== Facilities ==
Besides an unmanned terminal there are no other facilities at the airstrip and no fuel is available.

== See also ==
- Colville Lake Water Aerodrome
