= Fort Good Hope Airport =

Airport in the Northwest Territories, Canada

- IATA: YGH; ICAO: CYGH; WMO: 71491

Summary
- Airport type: Public
- Operator: Government of the Northwest Territories
- Location: Fort Good Hope, Northwest Territories
- Time zone: Northwest Territories Time (UTC−06:00)
- Elevation AMSL: 267 ft (81 m)
- Coordinates: 66°14′26″N 128°38′51″W

Map
- Location in the Northwest Territories

Runways
Direction	Length		Surface
Direction	ft	m	Surface
07/25	4,434	1,351	Gravel

Statistics (2010)
- Aircraft movements: 2,060
- Sources: Canada Flight Supplement; Environment Canada; Movements from Statistics Canada

Fort Good Hope Airport (IATA: YGH, ICAO: CYGH) is an airport located 1 nautical mile (1.9 km; 1.2 mi) southwest of Fort Good Hope, Northwest Territories, Canada.

== Facilities ==
A small terminal building with a waiting area is the airport's largest structure. There are no storage hangars at the airport.

Airport runway is gravel, so it handles mainly turboprops (small utility aircraft up to turboprop regional airliner), STOL, and other aircraft capable of landing on unpaved or snow covered surfaces.

== Airlines and destinations ==
The airport connects with a few communities within NWT. Destinations beyond requires connecting flights from Inuvik Airport as there is no direct passenger service to and from Yellowknife Airport.

Airlines	Destinations
North-Wright Airways	Colville Lake, Inuvik, Norman Wells

=== Cargo ===
Airlines	Destinations
Buffalo Airways	Yellowknife
