= Wekweètì Airport =

- IATA: YFJ; ICAO: CYWE; TC LID: CFJ7

Summary
- Airport type: Public
- Operator: Government of the Northwest Territories
- Serves: Wekweeti, Northwest Territories, Canada
- Time zone: Northwest Territories Time (UTC−06:00)
- Elevation AMSL: 1,208 ft (368 m)
- Coordinates: 64°11′27″N 114°04′36″W

Map
- Location in the Northwest Territories

Runways
Direction	Length		Surface
Direction	ft	m	Surface
13/31	2,999	914	Gravel
- Source: Canada Flight Supplement

Wekweètì Airport (IATA: YFJ, ICAO: CYWE, TC LID: CFJ7), formerly known as Snare Lake Airport, is located 3.2 nautical miles (5.9 km; 3.7 mi) east of Wekweeti, Northwest Territories, Canada.

== Airlines and destinations ==
Airlines	Destinations
Air Tindi	Yellowknife
