= Colvill =

Colvill is a surname. Notable people with the surname include:

- David Colvill Anderson VRD QC (1916–1995), Scottish law lecturer, advocate, Unionist MP, Solicitor General for Scotland, and judge
- Aoife Colvill (born 2000), Irish Australian football forward
- Clerk Colvill, fictional character in Child ballad 42 who dies after being seduced by a mermaid
- William Colvill (1612–1675), 17th-century Scottish minister, scholar, Principal of the University of Edinburgh from 1662 to 1675
- William J. Colvill (1830–1905), American Union colonel in the American Civil War who led the 1st Minnesota Volunteer Infantry in the Battle of Gettysburg
- Lord Colvill of Ochiltree, title in the Peerage of Scotland, created by the exiled King Charles II on 4 January 1651

== See also ==
- Colesville (disambiguation)
- Coleville (disambiguation)
- Colleville (disambiguation)
- Colvile (disambiguation)
- Colville (disambiguation)
