= Colville =

Colville may refer to:

== Places ==
=== Canada ===
- Colville Lake (Northwest Territories), a lake in Northwest Territories
- Colville Lake, Northwest Territories, a settlement corporation
- Colville Range, a small mountain range in southwestern British Columbia

=== New Zealand ===
- Colville, New Zealand, a small town
- Cape Colville, northernmost point of the Coromandel Peninsula
- Colville Channel, a channel connecting the Hauraki Gulf with the Pacific Ocean

=== United States ===
- Colville, Arkansas, an unincorporated community
- Colville, Kentucky, an unincorporated community
- Colville, Washington, a city
- Colville Indian Reservation, an Indian reservation in Washington state
- Colville Island, an island in the San Juan Islands of Washington state
- Colville National Forest, a U.S. National Forest
- Colville River (Alaska), a river on the Arctic Ocean coast
- Colville River (Washington), a tributary of the Columbia River

=== United Kingdom ===
- Colville (ward), an electoral ward of Kensington and Chelsea London Borough Council that was created in 1974

== Other uses ==
- Colville (surname), several people with the surname
- Colville people, a Native American people in Washington state, USA
- Colville Gardens, a street in London, England
- Clan Colville, a Lowland Scottish clan
- Colville-Okanagan language a Native American language
- Carlton Colville, Suffolk, England
- David Colville & Sons, a former steel company from Scotland

== See also ==
- Confederated Tribes of the Colville Reservation, a federally recognized Native American tribe in Washington state, USA
- Fort Colvile, a former Hudson Bay Company trade center near the present site of Kettle Falls, Washington
- Fort Colville
- Colvile (disambiguation)
- Coalville (disambiguation)
- Colleville (disambiguation)
- Coleville (disambiguation)
- Colville Lake (disambiguation)
- Colville River (disambiguation)
