= Coolsville =

Coolsville may refer to:

- Coolsville Sounds, sound studio of Glam Sam and His Combo
- Coolsville/Interscope Records, studio that released the 1999 Big Bad Voodoo Daddy album, This Beautiful Life
- "Coolsville Comics & Toys", fictional comic book store in the 2007 The Simpsons episode "Husbands and Knives"
- Coolsville, Ohio, fictional location in the series, A Pup Named Scooby-Doo
- "Coolsville", song on the 1979 Rickie Lee Jones album, Rickie Lee Jones
- "Coolsville", song on the 1989 Laurie Anderson album, Strange Angels

== See also ==
- Coolville, Ohio
- Colesville (disambiguation)
