= Piste =

Marked ski run

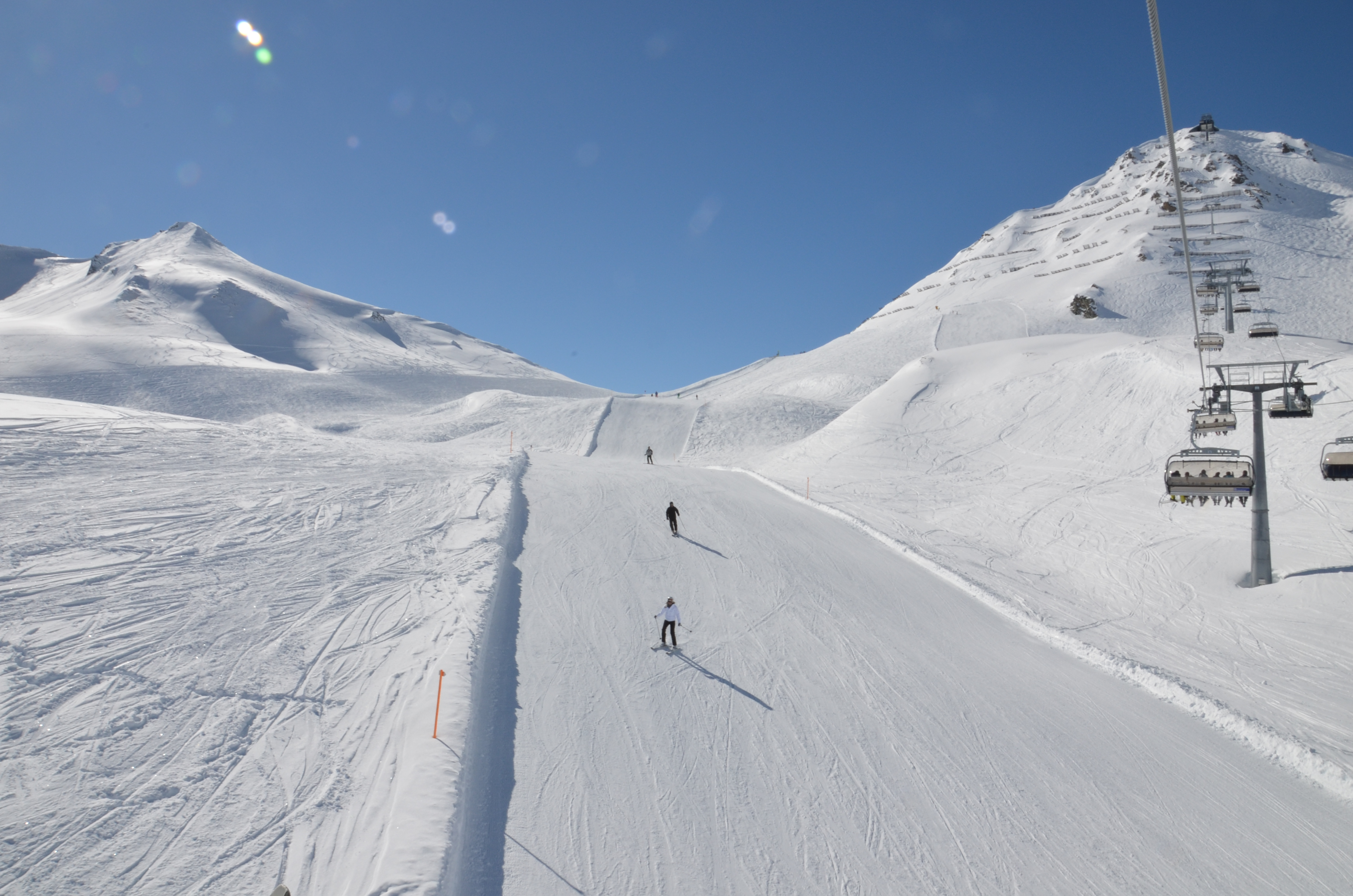
A piste in Serfaus, Austria

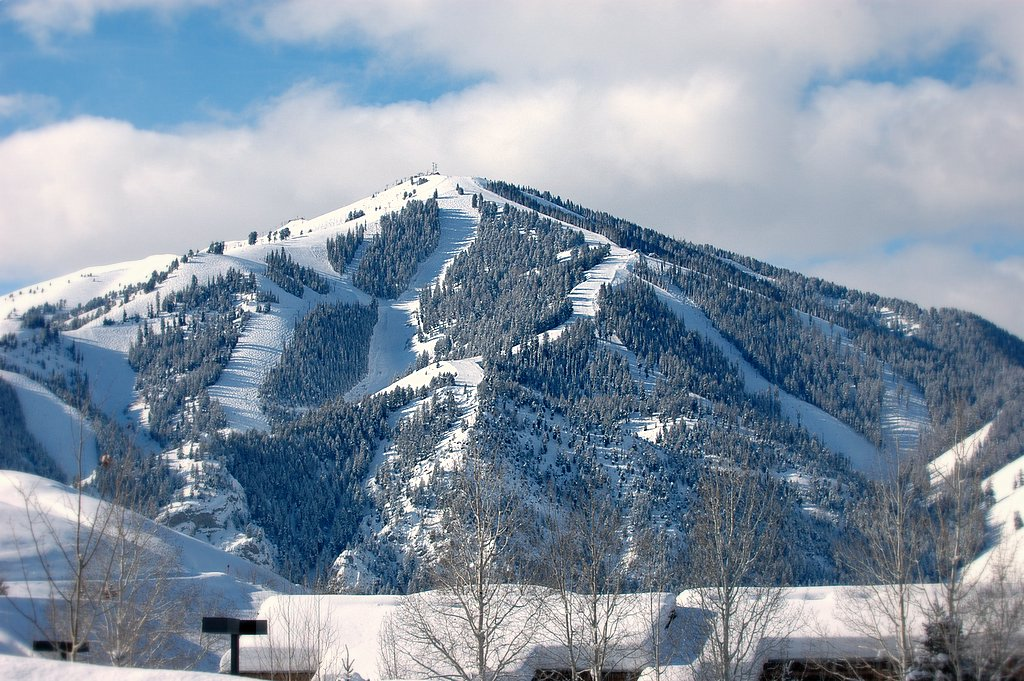
Pistes on Bald Mountain, Idaho

A piste (/piːst/) is a marked trail or path down a mountain for snow skiing, snowboarding, or other mountain sports.

This term is from French ("trail", "track") and is synonymous with 'trail', 'slope', or 'run' in North America. The word is pronounced with a long i as in the original French.

North Americans employ its antonym, 'off piste', to describe backcountry skiing, especially when referring to skiing outside officially approved areas of a ski resort.

== Construction ==
Pistes are not naturally occurring features, and must be created through human means. This can be done by "clearing" (removing the trees only) or by "grading" (clearing followed by reshaping of the surface by machines like graders).

== Maintenance ==
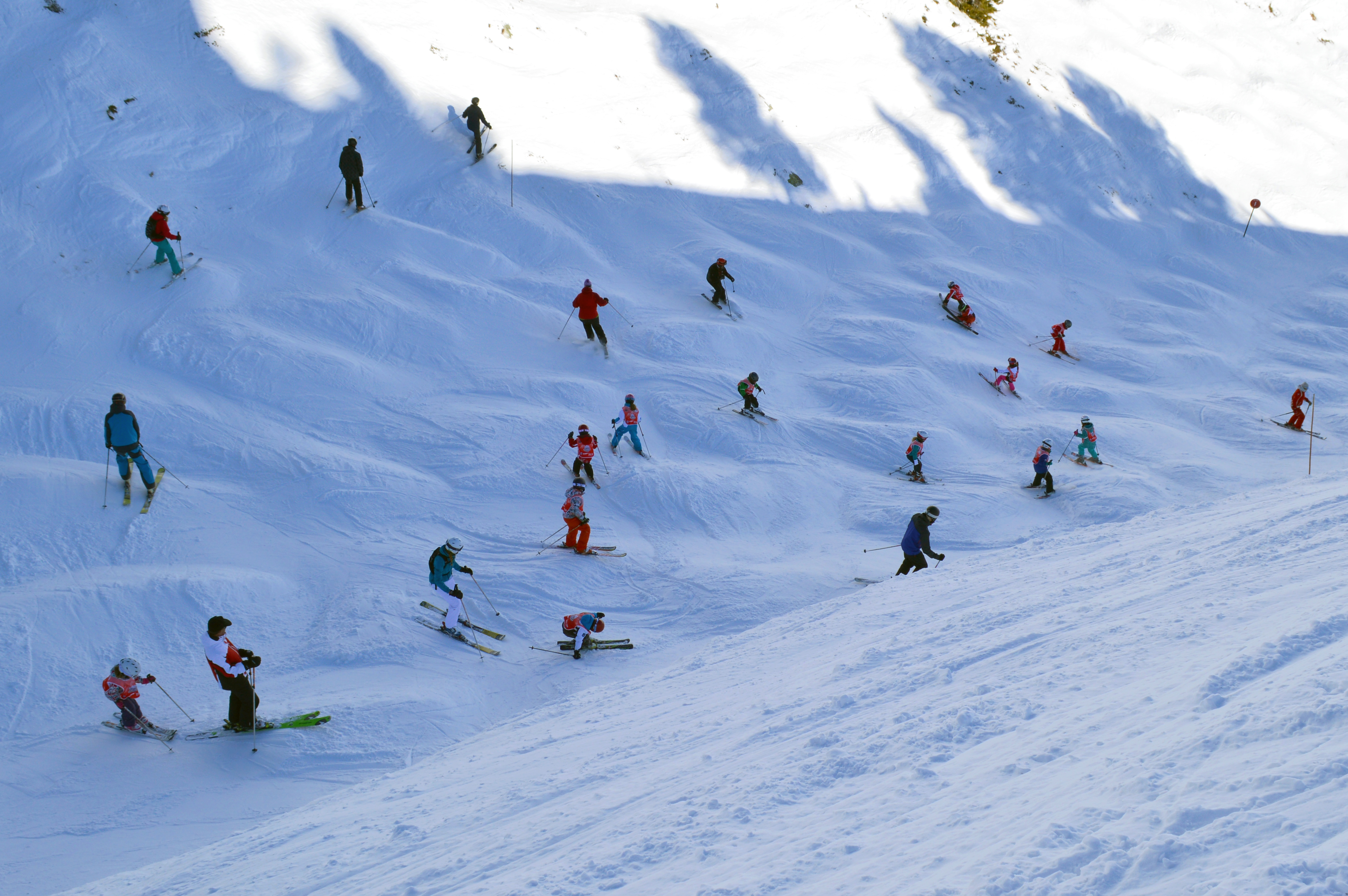
Moguls on a slope in Les Arcs, France

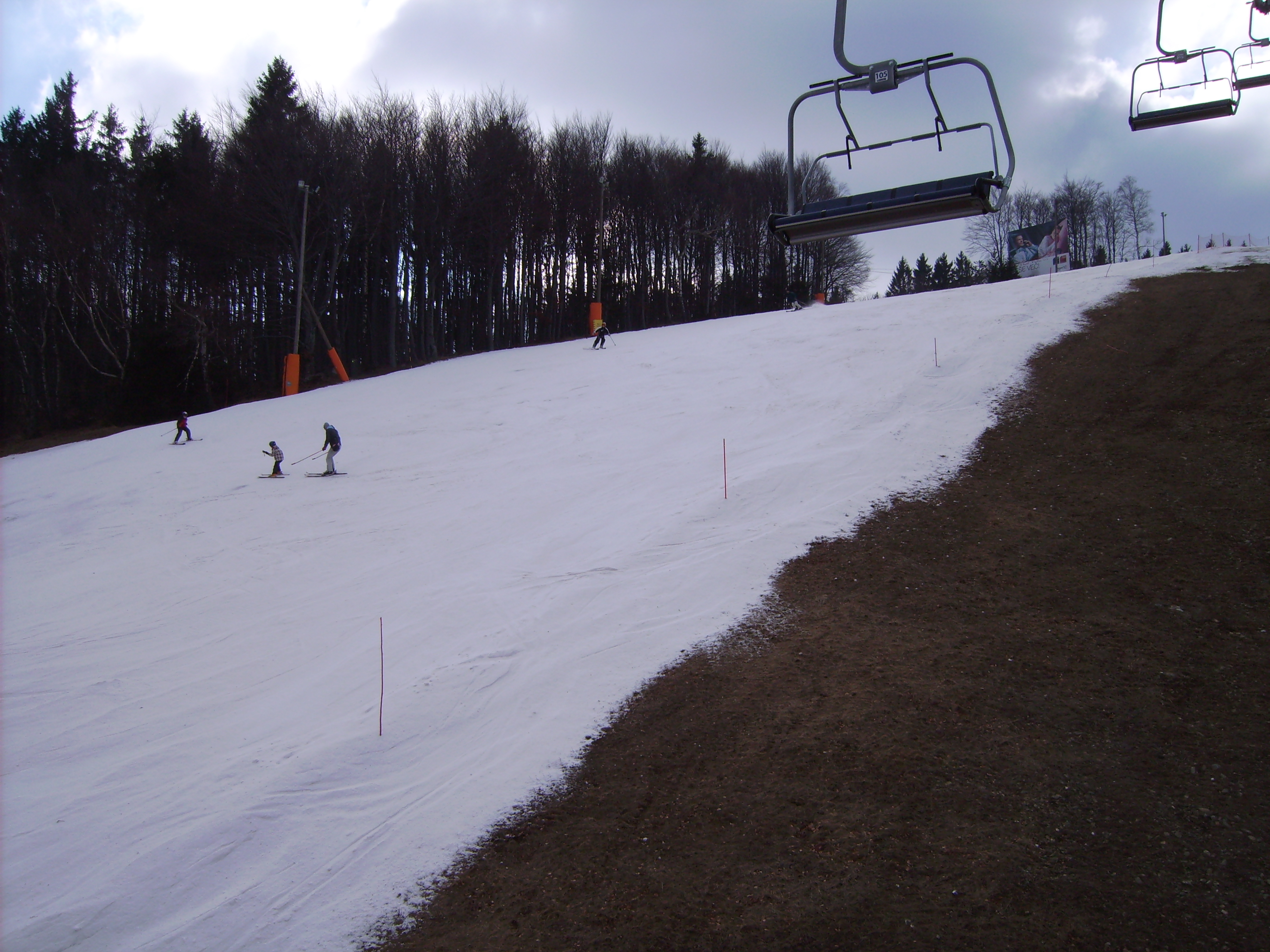
A piste in Pohorje, Slovenia, created with artificial snowmaking

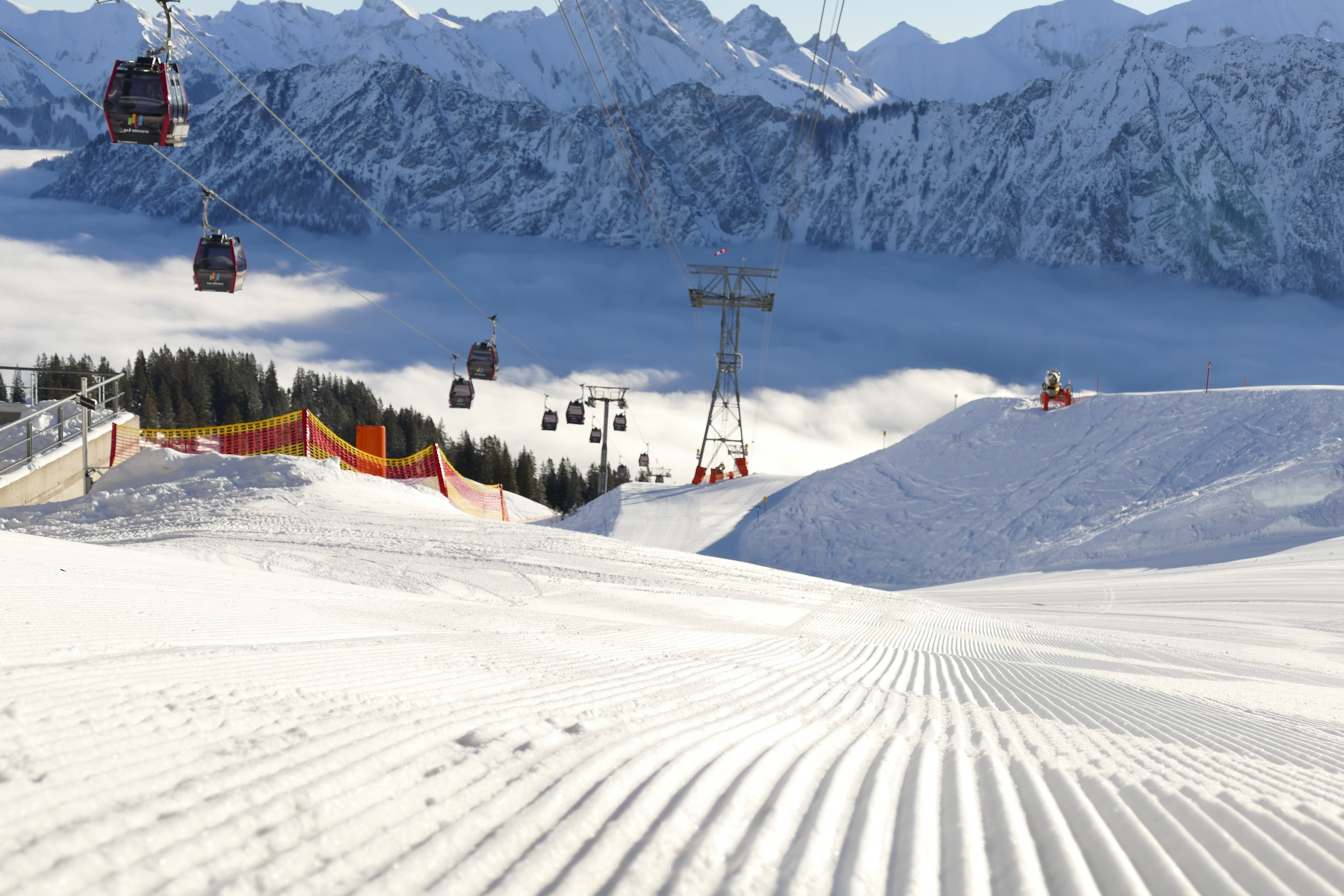
A freshly groomed piste in Oberstdorf, Germany

Pistes are usually maintained using tracked vehicles known as snowcats to compact or "groom" the snow to even out trail conditions, remove moguls, and redistribute snow to extend the ski season. Natural snow is often augmented with snow making machines and snow reserves, early in the season or when the snowpack is low, and to ensure the snow lasts throughout the season.

== Ratings ==
Resorts typically apply ratings to each piste on their property, using rating scales that vary by region.

=== Europe ===
A comparison of typical piste ratings in Europe

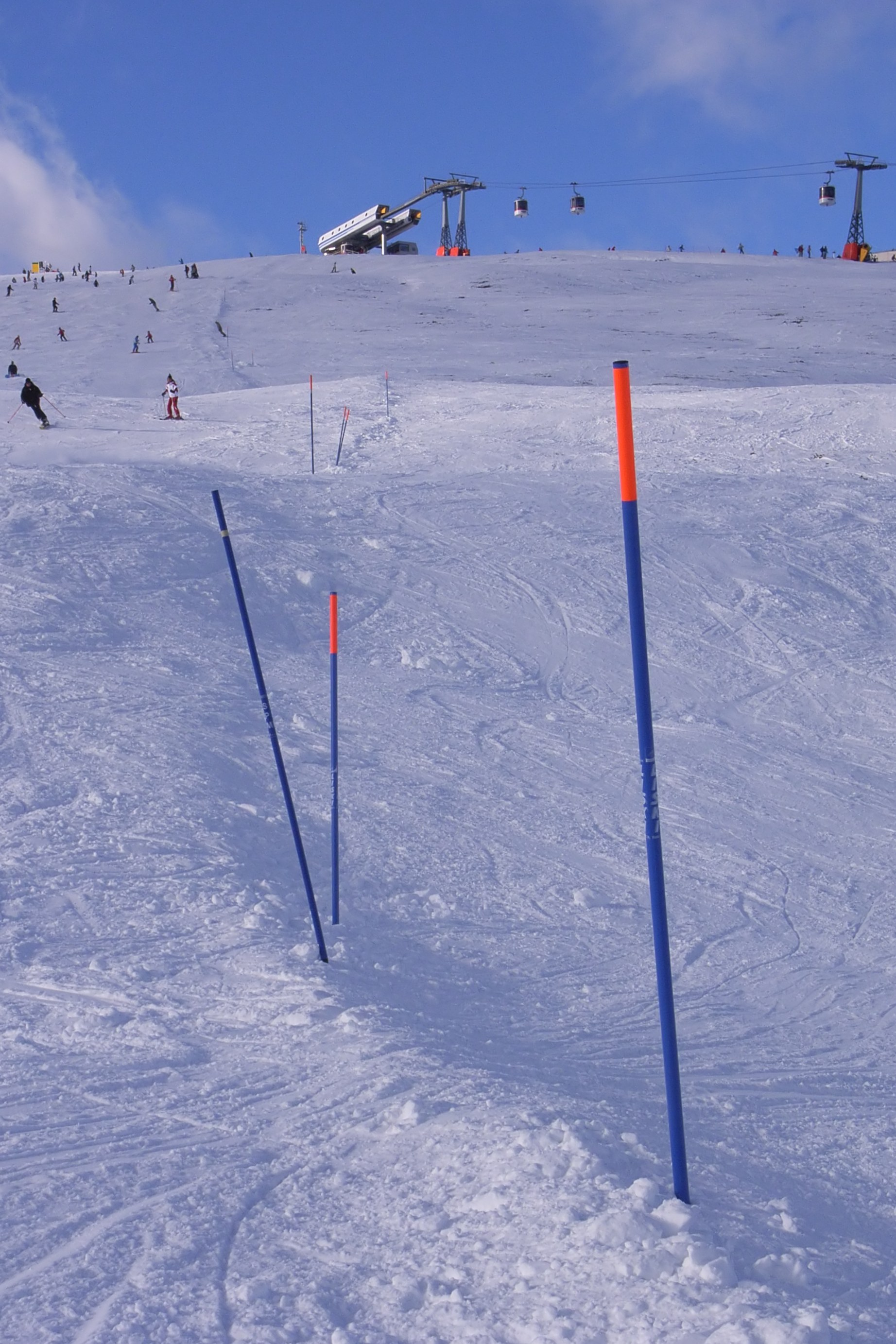
Blue piste markers in Kronplatz, Italy

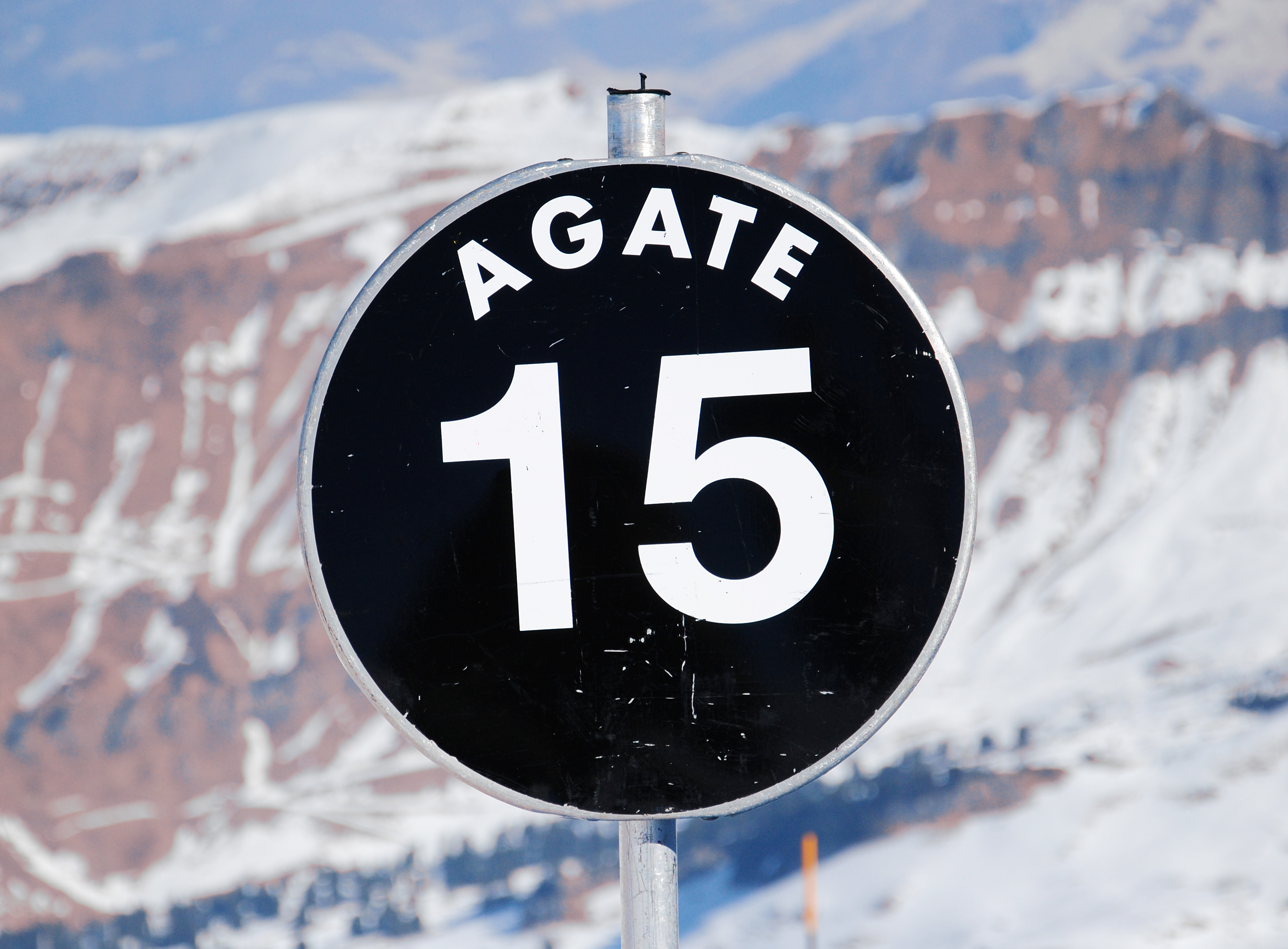
Sign for a black expert slope in Flaine, France

In Europe, pistes are classified by a color-coded system. The actual color system differs in parts for each country, although in all countries blue (easy), red (intermediate) and black (expert) are used. Shapes are often not used, sometimes all ratings are circles as being defined in the basic rules of the German Skiing Association DSV. The three basic color codes of the DSV have been integrated into the national standards DIN 32912 in Germany and ÖNORM S 4610 f in Austria.

In Scandinavia, a similar system is used with the addition of shapes, simplifying the identification of snow covered signs (see table below).

Slopes marked green, blue or red are groomed in all countries; blacks are groomed in Italy, Austria, Switzerland and Scandinavian resorts, while in France most black slopes are not groomed, but some are. All other classifications are generally not groomed. Sometimes slopes are marked on piste maps as dotted or as dashed lines, this also signifies that the slope is not groomed.

Ski piste difficulty ratings in Europe, excluding Scandinavia
Piste rating		Level of difficulty	Description
Green	Green	Learning/beginner	France, Poland, Spain, Bulgaria, UK and other countries. These are usually not marked trails, but tend to be large, open, gently sloping areas at the base of the ski area or traverse paths between the main trails.
Blue	Blue	Easy	These are almost always groomed. The slope gradient does not normally exceed 25% except for maybe some short wide sections.
Red	Red	Intermediate	Steeper or narrower than a blue slope, these are usually groomed, unless the narrowness of the trail prohibits it. The slope gradient does not normally exceed 40% except for maybe some short wide sections.
Black	Black	Advanced or expert	Steep, may or may not be groomed, or may be groomed for mogul skiing. In Austria, Italy and Switzerland black pistes are nearly always groomed, as non-groomed pistes are marked as skiroutes or itineraires (see below); in France, some black pistes are groomed, but most are not. Black can be a very wide classification, ranging from a slope marginally more difficult than a red, to very steep avalanche chutes like the infamous Couloirs of Courchevel. France tends to have a higher limit between red and black.
Orange	Orange	Extremely difficult	Austria, Switzerland, and certain other areas only. In a small number of areas, orange is used to mark pistes that are more difficult than black.
Yellow	Yellow	Skiroute, itinéraire, or freerideroute	In recent years, many areas reclassified some black slopes to yellow slopes. These are ungroomed and unpatrolled routes which are actually off-piste skiing, but marked and secured from avalanches. Famous examples are the Stockhorn area in Zermatt and the Tortin slopes in Verbier. In Austria, skiroutes are usually marked with orange squares instead. It is also common to mark these routes with a red diamond or a red diamond with black edges, the latter being more difficult.
Orange square	Orange square	Skiroute, itinéraire, or freerideroute	In recent years, many areas reclassified some black slopes to yellow slopes. These are ungroomed and unpatrolled routes which are actually off-piste skiing, but marked and secured from avalanches. Famous examples are the Stockhorn area in Zermatt and the Tortin slopes in Verbier. In Austria, skiroutes are usually marked with orange squares instead. It is also common to mark these routes with a red diamond or a red diamond with black edges, the latter being more difficult.
Red diamond	Red diamond	Skiroute, itinéraire, or freerideroute	In recent years, many areas reclassified some black slopes to yellow slopes. These are ungroomed and unpatrolled routes which are actually off-piste skiing, but marked and secured from avalanches. Famous examples are the Stockhorn area in Zermatt and the Tortin slopes in Verbier. In Austria, skiroutes are usually marked with orange squares instead. It is also common to mark these routes with a red diamond or a red diamond with black edges, the latter being more difficult.
Red diamond with black edges	Red diamond with black edges	Skiroute, itinéraire, or freerideroute	In recent years, many areas reclassified some black slopes to yellow slopes. These are ungroomed and unpatrolled routes which are actually off-piste skiing, but marked and secured from avalanches. Famous examples are the Stockhorn area in Zermatt and the Tortin slopes in Verbier. In Austria, skiroutes are usually marked with orange squares instead. It is also common to mark these routes with a red diamond or a red diamond with black edges, the latter being more difficult.

Alpine slope classification in Europe is less rigidly tied to slope angle than in North America. A lower angle slope may be classified as more difficult than a steeper slope if it requires better skiing ability because, for example, it is narrower, requires carrying speed through flatter sections or controlling speed through sharp hairpin turns, or features off-camber slope angles or exposed rock.

==== Scandinavia ====
In Norway, Sweden and Finland, a system is used with similar colours as elsewhere in Europe, but with shapes as well.

Ski piste difficulty ratings in Scandinavia
Piste rating		Level of difficulty	Description
Green circle	Green circle	Very easy	Up to 9° (16%) slope.
Blue square	Blue square	Easy	Up to 15° (27%) slope.
Red rectangle	Red rectangle	Moderately difficult	Up to 25° (47%) slope.
Black diamond	Black diamond	Difficult	Over 25° (47%) slope. Triple black diamond may also be used in some areas.
Double black diamond	Double black diamond	Very difficult	Over 25° (47%) slope. Triple black diamond may also be used in some areas.

=== North America, Australia and New Zealand ===
A comparison of typical ski trail ratings in North America, Australia, and New Zealand

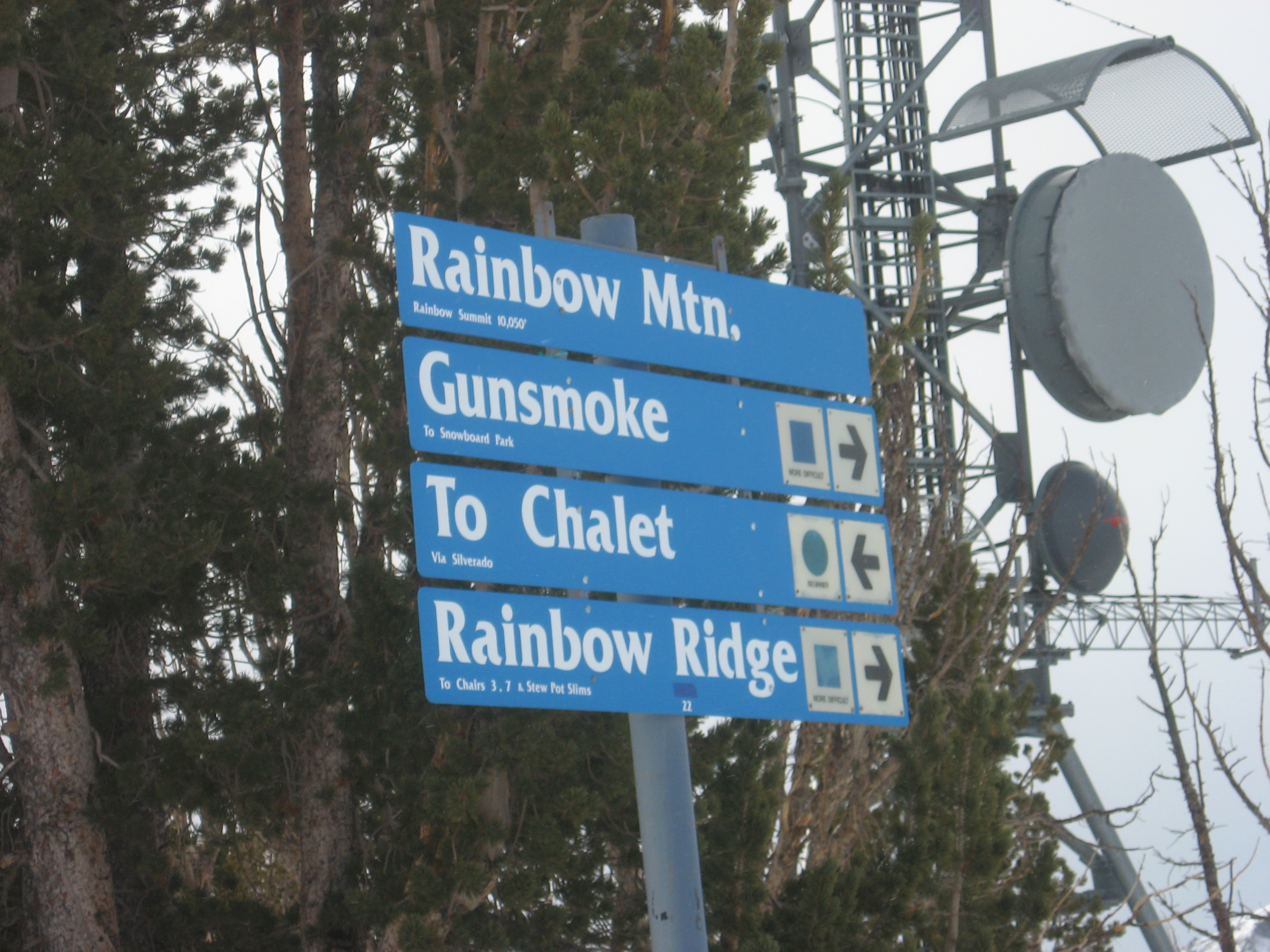
A typical sign indicating ski slopes and their difficulty

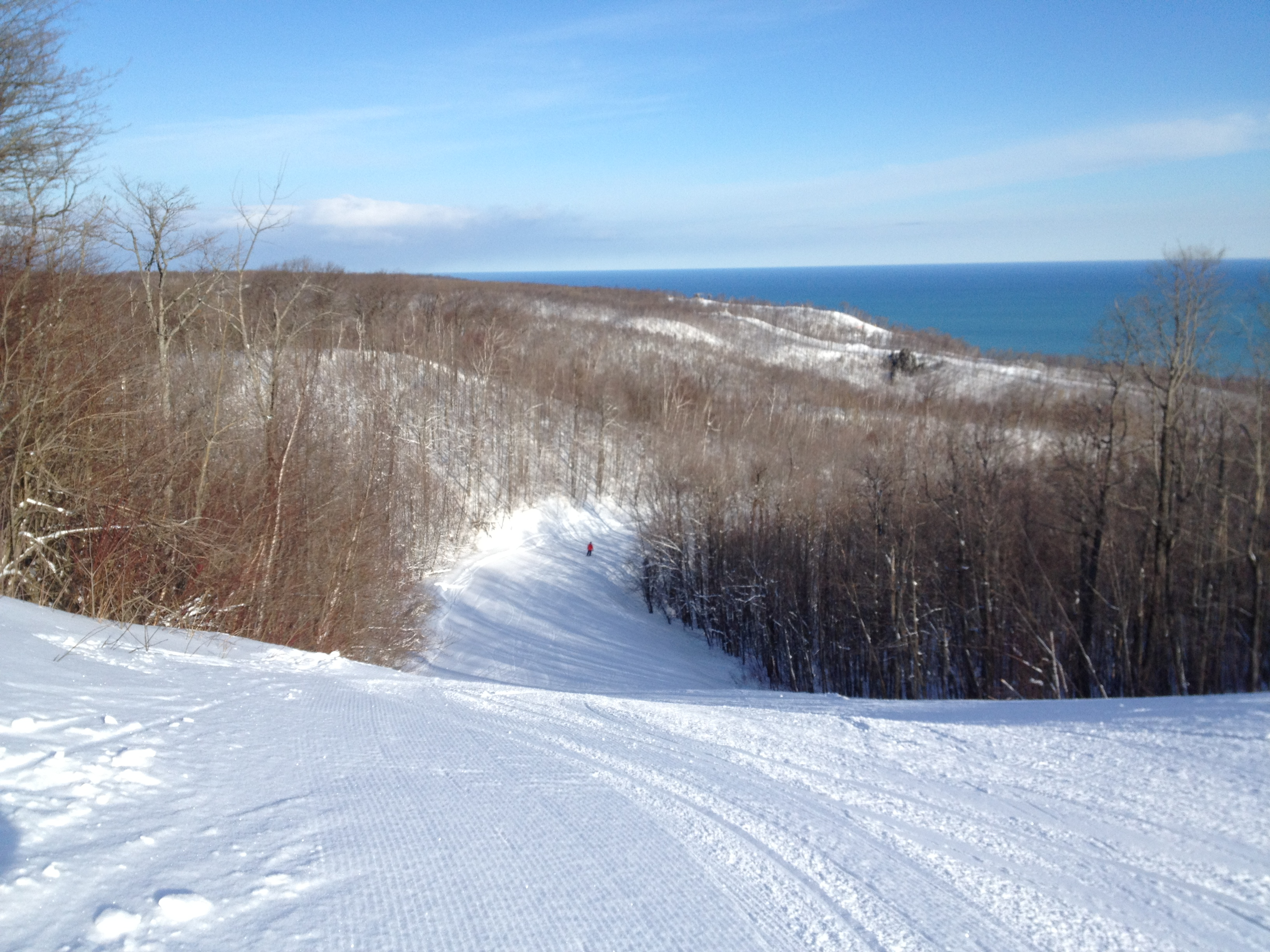
A piste in Collingwood, Canada

In North America, Australia and New Zealand, a color–shape rating system is used to indicate the comparative difficulty of trails (otherwise known as slopes or pistes). The U.S. National Ski Areas Association refined its trail rating system in 1968 based on research by The Walt Disney Company, which had planned to use green circles, blue squares, and black diamonds to mark trails at a resort that it had planned to build at Mineral King.

The steepness of ski trails is usually measured by grade (as a percentage) instead of degree angle. In general, beginner slopes (green circle) are between 6% and 25%. Intermediate slopes (blue square) are between 25% and 40%. Difficult slopes (black diamond) are 40% and up. However, this is just a general "rule of thumb". Although slope gradient is the primary consideration in assigning a trail difficulty rating, other factors come into play. A trail will be rated by its most difficult part, even if the rest of the trail is easy. Ski resorts assign ratings to their own trails, rating a trail compared only with other trails at that resort. The resort may take into consideration the width of the trail, sharpest turns, terrain roughness, the direction of the fall line, and whether the trail is groomed regularly.

Ski trail difficulty ratings in North America, Australia, and New Zealand
Trail rating		Level of difficulty	Description
Green circle	Green circle	Easiest	The easiest slopes at a mountain. Generally, Green Circle trails are wide and groomed, with slope grades ranging from 6% to 25%.
Blue square	Blue square	Intermediate	Intermediate difficulty slopes. Generally, Intermediate trails are groomed, with grades ranging from 25% to 40%. Blue Square trails make up the bulk of pistes at most ski areas.
Black diamond	Black diamond	Advanced Difficult	Amongst the most difficult slopes at a mountain. Generally, Black Diamond trails are steep (40% and up) and may or may not be groomed.
Double black diamond	Double black diamond	Very Difficult	These trails are more difficult than Black Diamond, due to exceptionally steep slopes and other hazards such as narrow trails, exposure to wind, and the presence of obstacles such as steep drop-offs or trees. They are intended only for experienced skiers. This trail rating is fairly new; by the 1980s, technological improvements in trail construction and maintenance, coupled with intense marketing competition, led to the creation of a Double Black Diamond rating.
Triple black diamond		Expert Only	These trails are even more difficult than Double Black Diamonds, due to even more exceptionally steep slopes and other hazards such as narrow trails, exposure to wind, and the presence of obstacles such as steep drop-offs or a lot of trees. They are intended only for the most experienced skiers and good equipment is recommended. These trails are among the rarest.
Variations	Blue square/black diamond	Various	Variations such as doubling a symbol to indicate increased difficulty, or combining two different symbols to indicate intermediate difficulty are occasionally used, as is often in Colorado at Winter Park resort and other Colorado ski resorts. One example is a diamond overlapping a square to indicate a trail rating between a Blue Square and a Black Diamond, colloquially a 'Blue-Black'. This is used by several eastern resorts, with notable example being at Windham, New York. Many resorts throughout Colorado use a double diamond with an "EX" in the center to mark a run with extreme terrain, even more difficult than a double diamond. Other resorts, such as Smugglers' Notch, Vermont, Le Massif, Quebec, Big Sky, Montana and Mt. Bohemia, Michigan, use triple black diamonds. Some popular resorts use the blue-black combination symbol to indicate trails that are intermediate-advanced such as Mammoth Mountain in California and Winter Park in Colorado; however the combination of symbols is comparatively rare at U.S. ski areas; most ski resorts stick to the standard 4-symbol progression (with the exception of the common EX runs in Colorado). Non-standard symbols for standard ratings may be encountered at some ski areas. Bogus Basin, a resort near Boise, Idaho, uses orange diamonds on trailhead signs considered to be more difficult than double black diamonds; however, those trails are indicated on the trail map as double black diamonds. Jiminy Peak, MA uses two variations of normal trail ratings; one is a blue square with a green circle inside of it used to represent an easy-intermediate trail. The other is a blue square with a single black diamond in it, used to represent an intermediate-hard trail.
Terrain parks	Terrain park	Various	Terrain parks are whole or portions of trails that can offer a variety of jumps, half-pipes, and other special "extreme" sporting obstacles beyond traditional moguls. The trails are typically represented by an orange rectangle with rounded corners. Usually, the terrain park will carry its own trail rating, indicating the level of challenge. A terrain park with a Black Diamond or Double Black Diamond rating would contain greater and more challenging obstacles than a park with a Blue Square rating. Typically, a skier would be able to descend through a terrain park without necessarily negotiating any of its features, making this a possible easier way down than other options.

=== Japan ===
Japan uses a color-coded system, but shapes do not usually accompany them. Some resorts, mainly those catering to foreigners, use the North American or European color-coding system, adding to the confusion. The usual ratings are:

Ski piste difficulty ratings in Japan
Piste rating		Level of difficulty	Description
Green	Green	Beginner	These are usually near the base of the mountain, although some follow switchback routes down from the top.
Red	Red	Intermediate	At most ski areas in Japan, these constitute the majority of the slopes.
Black	Black	Expert	Expert slopes. These are the steepest and most difficult slopes at the ski area. The difficulty of these compared to like-classified slopes at other ski areas is heavily dependent on the target audience.

Japan has more than 1000 ski areas (115 in Nagano Prefecture alone), many of them small and family-oriented, so comparisons between slope classifications in Japan and "equivalent" slopes in Europe or North America can be misleading.

== Bunny slope ==
A bunny slope, also known as a bunny hill, is an informal term that refers to a beginner difficulty ski run (can either be a whole hill or part of one) that is very flat, groomed, wide, and clear. The origin of the word has multiple theories.

== See also ==
- Cross-country skiing trail
- Dry ski slope
- Night skiing
- Snow road
- Trail difficulty rating system
