= Colville Lake =

Colville Lake may refer to:

- Colville Lake (Northwest Territories), a lake in the Northwest Territories, Canada
- Colville Lake, Northwest Territories, a community located on the lake
- Colville Lake/Tommy Kochon Aerodrome that serves the community
- Colville Lake Water Aerodrome, on the lake near the community
