= Coleville =

Coleville may refer to:

- Coleville, Saskatchewan
- Coleville, California
- Coleville, Missouri
- Coleville, Pennsylvania

== See also ==
- Colleville (disambiguation)
- Colville (disambiguation)
- Coalville (disambiguation)
- Colvile (disambiguation)
