= Colesville =

Colesville is the name of some places in the United States of America:

- Colesville, Maryland
- Colesville, New York
- Colesville, Pennsylvania

== See also ==
- Coalville
- Coalville, Utah
- Coleville
- Coolsville (disambiguation)
