= Ice road =

Path made over frozen water rather than land

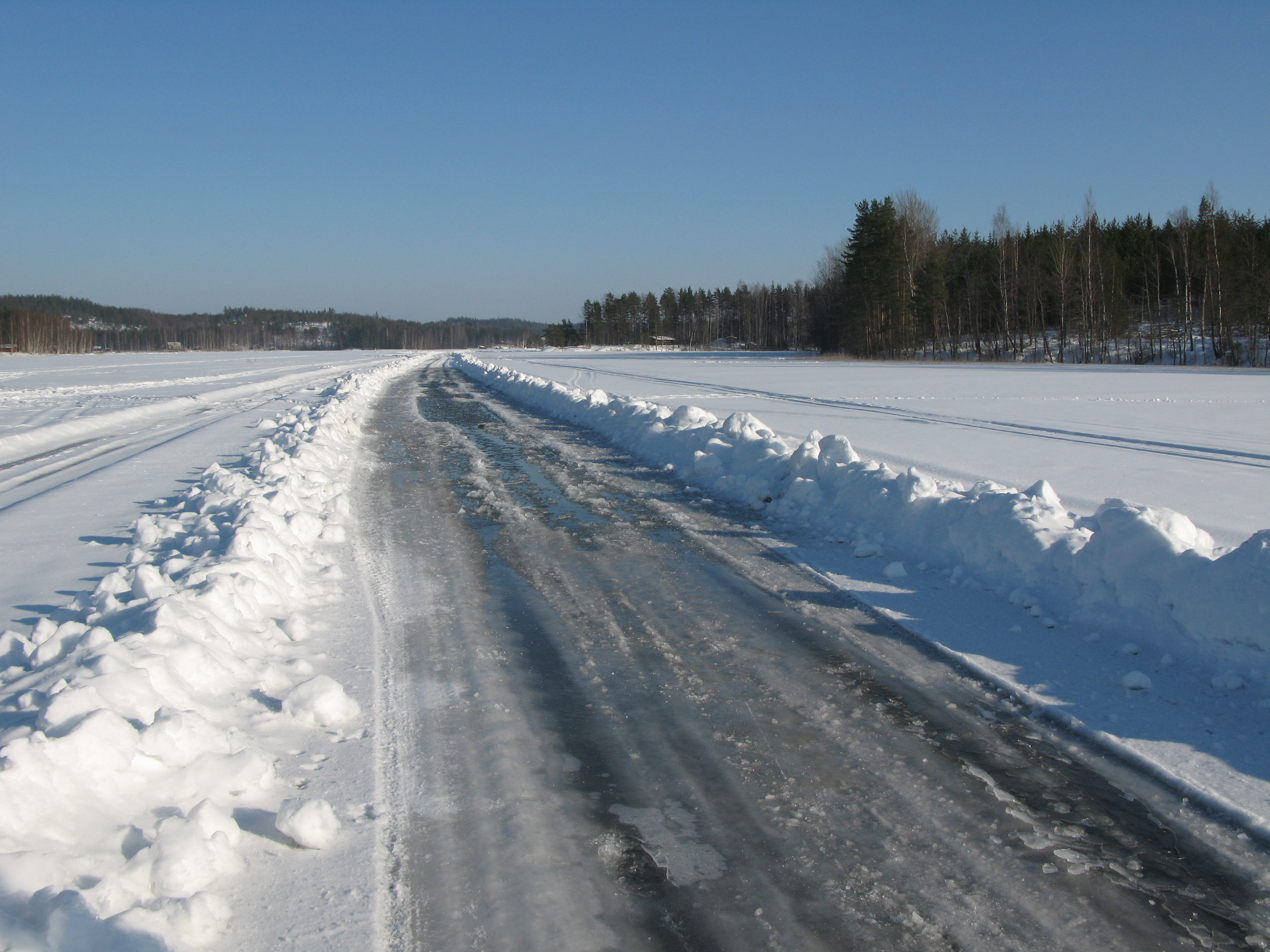
Ice road on Lake Saimaa in Finland

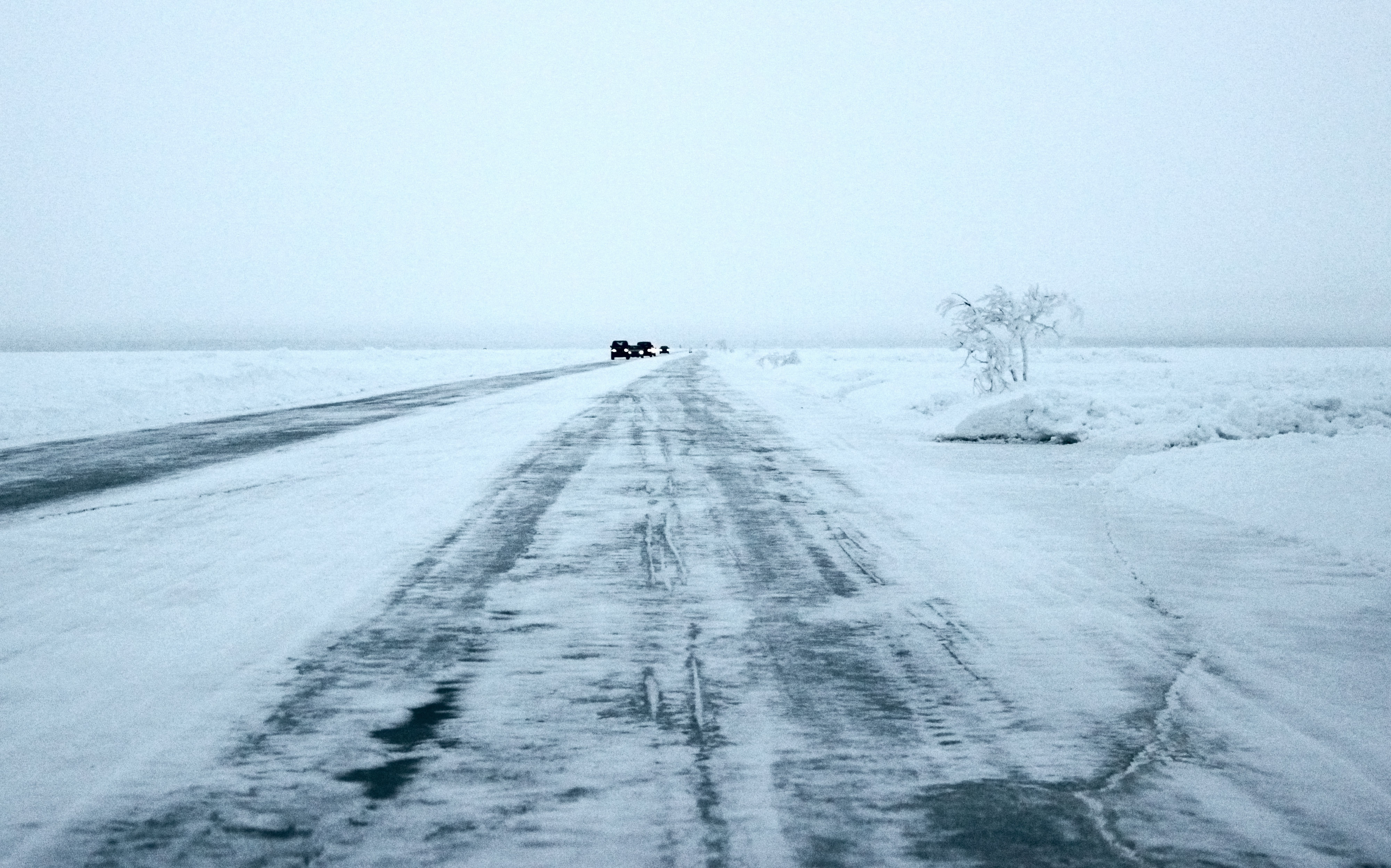
Ice road between Oulunsalo and Hailuoto. This is the longest ice road in Finland.

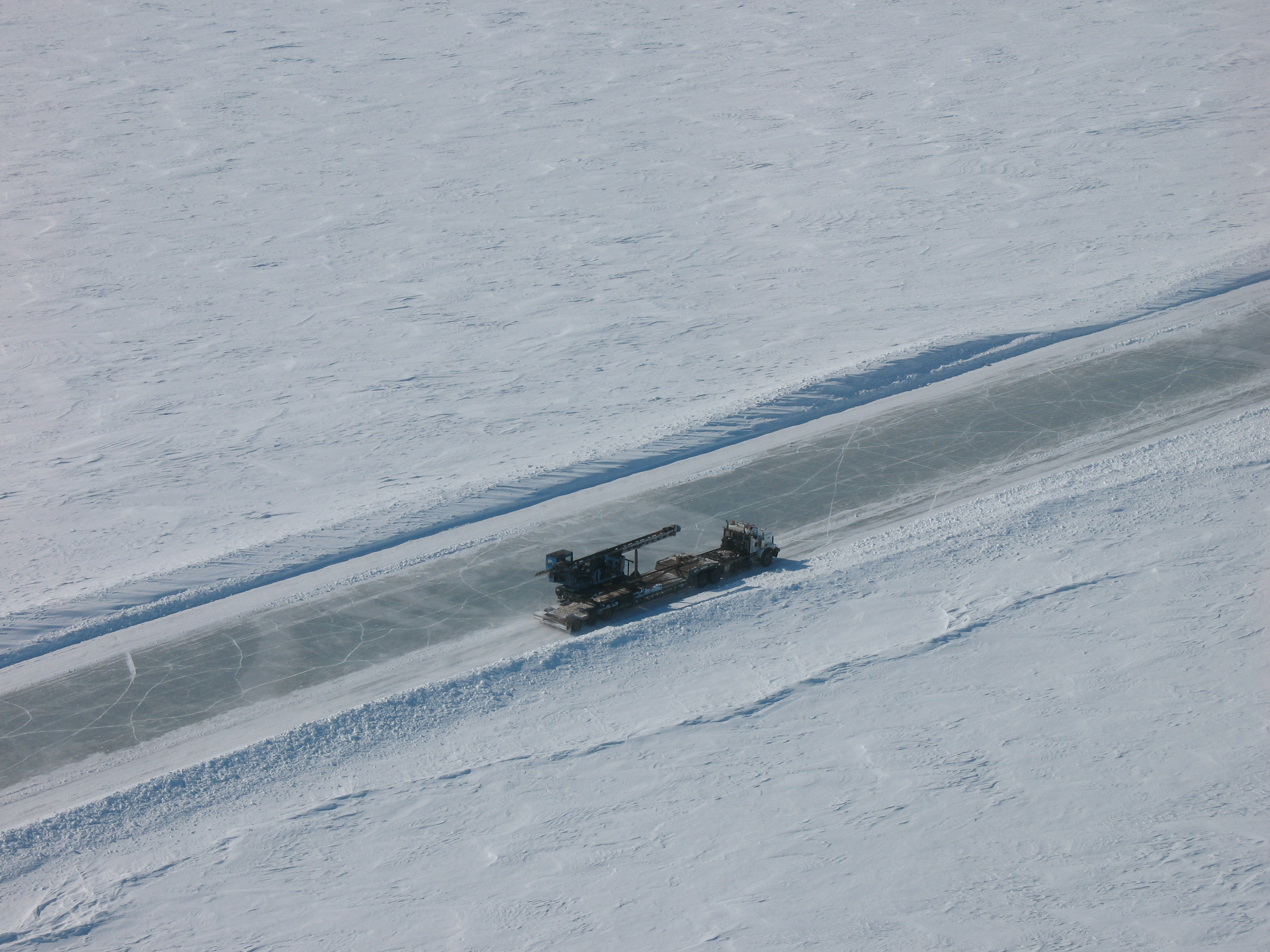
Truck on the former winter road between Inuvik and Tuktoyaktuk

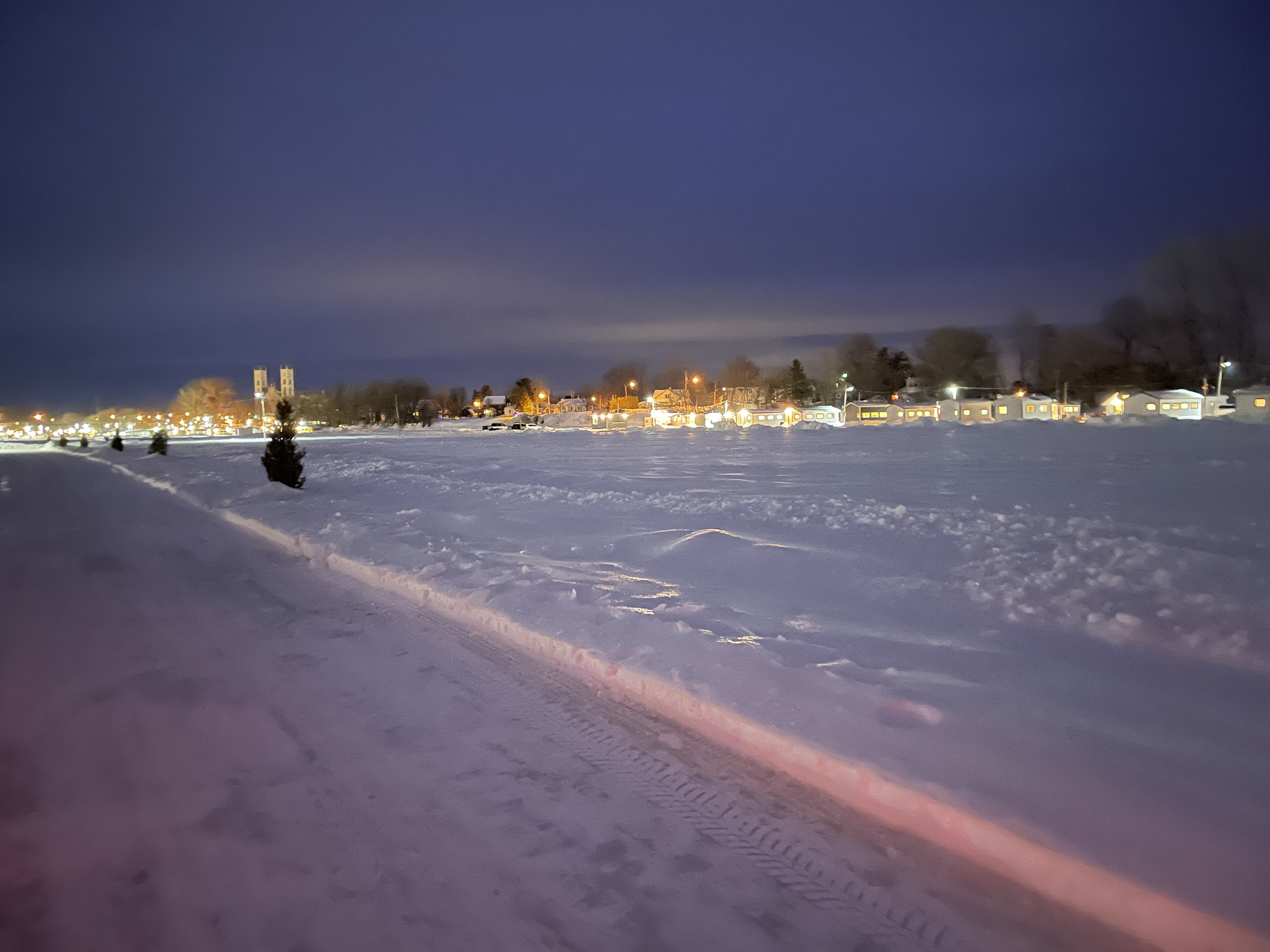
Ice road, Sainte-Anne River, Quebec, Canada

An ice road or ice bridge is a human-made structure that runs on a frozen water surface (a river, a lake or a sea water expanse). Ice roads are typically part of a winter road, but they can also be simple stand-alone structures, connecting two shorelines. Ice roads may be planned, built and maintained so as to remain safe and effective, and a number of guidelines have been published with information in these regards. An ice road may be constructed year after year, for instance to service community needs during the winter. It could also be for a single year or two, so as to supply particular operations, such as a hydroelectric project or offshore drill sites.

== Ice bearing capacity ==
The pressures of the water, related with ice buoyancy, upon short-term vertical loading an ice cover (adapted from). Not to scale — for illustrative purposes only.

The ability of an ice road to safely support the weight of a vehicle, or any other loads applied onto it, referred to as bearing capacity, is the primary concern when designing, building and using that structure. Generally speaking, a vertically loaded ice cover will react in two ways: 1) it will sink, and 2) it will bend in flexure. In order to meet the ice bearing criteria, the top surface should not sink below the water line and the applied flexural stress should not exceed the ice's flexural strength. Three loading regimes have to be considered: a) maximum weight for standard usage or for parking during a short duration; b) a load that remains stationary during an extensive time period; and c) dynamic loading of the ice cover, from a traveling vehicle.

=== Maximum weight ===
For standard traffic activities, guidelines typically use a simple empirical formula to determine the maximum vehicle weight that should be allowed on an ice road. This formula, which was initially proposed in 1971, is often referred to as Gold's formula:

$$P=Ah^2$$

where P is the load, h is the thickness and A is a constant with a unit of pressure. It may be linked with an idealized elastic response of the ice cover:

$$\sigma_{\max}=CP/h^2 \text{ or } CP=\sigma_{\max}h^2$$

where σ_{max} is the maximum tensile strength at the bottom of an infinite ice plate resting on an elastic foundation. The parameter C is based on the theory of thick plates. Hence, with this idealized formulation, A is representative of the ice cover tensile strength. Although recommended values for A range from 3.5 to 10 kg/cm^{2} (50 to 142 psi), lower bound values are generally those that are used for safety purposes. This level of conservatism is justified because, unlike human-made materials such as steel or concrete, natural ice covers inherently contain a large amount of structural flaws (fractures, water and air pockets). Moreover, for a public road, which is relatively uncontrolled, such an approach introduces a high safety factor against breakthroughs and is therefore desirable. For industrial roads, the design may be less conservative so as to handle their functional requirements, i.e. higher A values can be used, but under the close supervision of a professional engineer.

=== Maximum loading time ===
Freeboard on an ice road at different time intervals

When using Gold's formula, a purely elastic response is assumed, which is, by definition, instantaneous and independent of loading time. Ice, however, naturally exists at a high homologous temperature, i.e. near its melting point. As is the case for any other material under these conditions, response to loading is not only elastic, but incorporates other components, namely:

1. A time-dependent recoverable component – this causes the development of microcracks, which can lead to fracturing and, ultimately, a breakthrough;
2. A time-dependent irrecoverable component – this is commonly referred to as creep, which is related with the mechanisms responsible for glacier flow (long term) and plays a negligible role in the response of an ice road to loading.

Thus, an ice cover may be able to safely support a vehicle, but if it remains on the ice for too long, deformation will continue via microcracking, leading to the collapse of the ice cover below the vehicle. Recommendations vary as to how this can be avoided. Some sources prescribe a maximum of two hours for a stationary load, which is also what Gold recommended. Others advise to use the freeboard of the ice as an indicator, which can be done by drilling a hole in it and monitoring the distance between the water in the hole and the ice surface. The vehicle should be removed before the water reaches the surface in that hole. Another reason why the amount of freeboard matters is that if the water makes its way onto the ice surface (through cracks and fissures), the ice cover's bearing capacity diminishes rapidly, which can accelerate breakthrough. For long-term loads, a professional engineer may have to be consulted.

=== Dynamic loading ===
Ice waves caused by a traveling vehicle – the vertical displacement of the ice surface, vastly exaggerated for illustrative purposes (see vertical scale at right), is indicated as a function of distance to vehicle. Adapted from, and based on satellite imagery.

As a vehicle travels on the road, a dynamic loading regime is exerted onto the ice cover. Below a specific speed, referred to as critical, the ice cover beneath the vehicle will assume the shape of a bowl moving with the vehicle, pushing away the water around it, as the keel of a boat does. At (and above) the critical speed, a series of waves will form behind and in front of the vehicle. "If the celerity of these waves is the same as the vehicle speed, the deflection and the stresses in the ice sheet are amplified, similar to resonance in an oscillating system" (pp. 8–10). The critical speed depends on ice thickness and water depth. Another issue that arises is the reflection of these waves from the shoreline back toward the vehicle. This can induce additional stresses on the ice – one way to mitigate this issue is to avoid approaching shorelines at 90 degrees. The critical speed is what determines the speed limit for vehicles traveling on ice roads. That limit can be as low as 10 to 35 km/h (6 to 22 mph). Dynamic loading of the ice cover may also dictate a minimum distance between vehicles.

The effects of dynamic loading on a floating ice sheet has been investigated via field testing. The most compelling evidence of such wave patterns, however, was captured by satellite imagery.

== Planning and construction ==
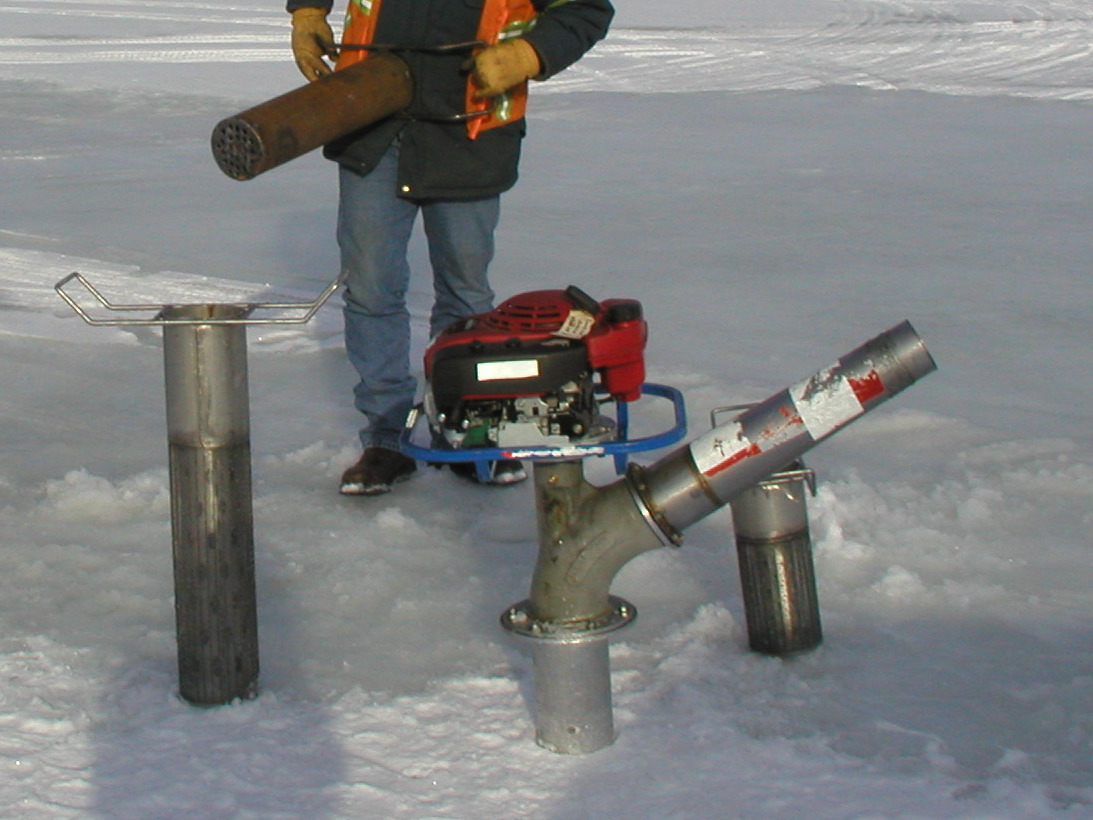
A low head pump used for flooding an ice surface

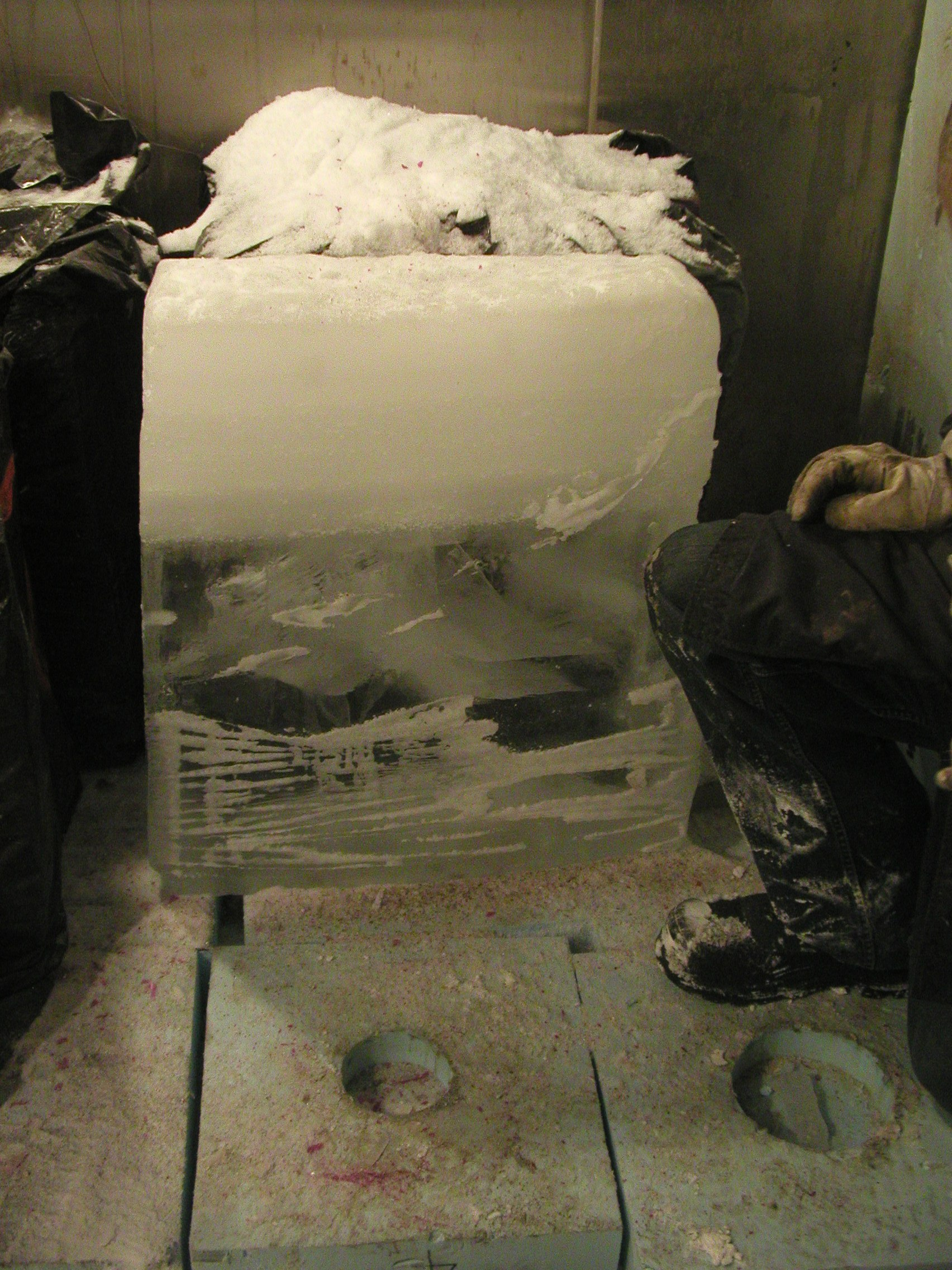
Clear ice overlain by constructed white ice (hand/foot for scale at right)

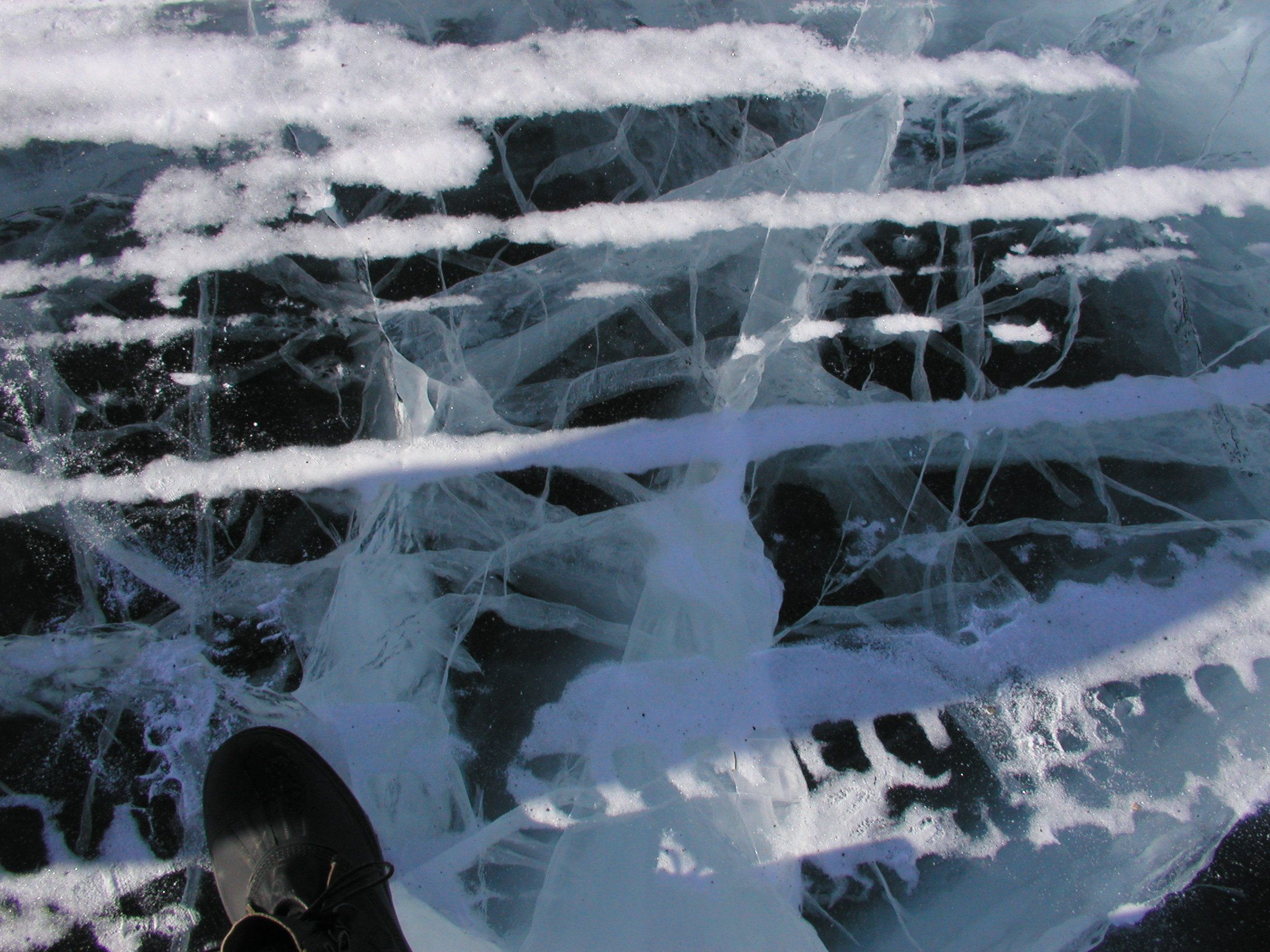
Fracture planes in clear ice – boot for scale at lower left. Note the tire tread imprints at lower right.

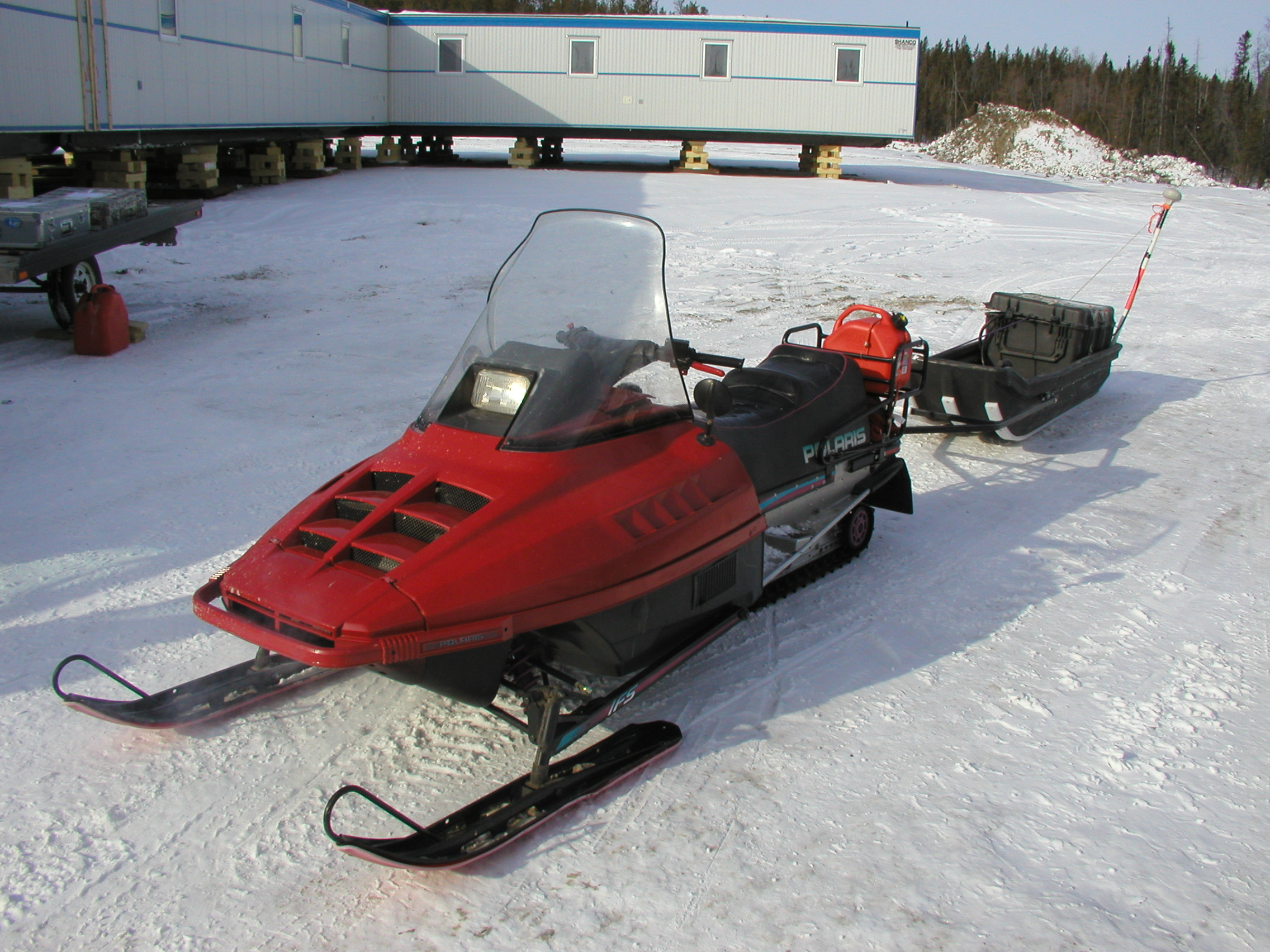
Snowmobile used to pull a sleigh on which there is a ground-penetrating radar, to obtain a continuous ice thickness profile

When an ice road is part of a winter road, as is commonly the case, its design and construction is comprised within the overall road planning, i.e. in conjunction with the over-land segments. Either way, factors that need to be addressed before construction include the following:

- Schedule and operating windows: The start of the operation, i.e. when the field crew begins to work, is dependent on the ice thickness that is naturally achieved (typically under a snow cover). That thickness has to be sufficient to withstand the weight of light equipment that is then used to remove the snow cover. That snow acts as an insulator and removing it accelerates ice growth at the ice-water interface (along the bottom of the ice cover).
- Traffic type and volume: This is about determining the transportation requirements for the operating season (e.g. equipment, supplies, fuel), and means to get that material across (e.g. vehicle types, weight, traffic volume).
- Road right-of-way: This refers to the road width required to accommodate the traffic. This may range from 30 m (98 ft) to 60 m (200 ft). Ideally, it has to be wide enough to leave room on both sides for the snow banks and snow drift, with extra space between that snow and the actual travel lane.
- Environmental and regulatory requirements: Licenses and permits vary from one jurisdiction to another. Examples can include time-limited land-use permits and access to water sources (for the protection of lakes and rivers).

Factors that need to be considered in route selection include the following:

- Deeper water is preferable, to avoid issues related with dynamic loading. Ice along shorelines and above shoals is prone to fracturing.
- Avoid areas where there are strong water currents, or next to the mouth of small rivers and creeks. The temperature at the ice-water interface being 0 °C (32 °F), flow of water at a slightly higher temperature will thermally erode that interface, thereby reducing the ice thickness.
- Consider the effects of water level changes, for instance upstream of a water body regulated by dams.
- A review of historical ice conditions, using local knowledge and satellite imagery, can help decipher recurrent problematic areas, such as ice ridging.

Before first access to the ice, the following factors need to be considered:

- Due caution needs to be exercised – this includes appropriate personnel protective equipment (PPE) such as a flotation device, adequate training and working in pairs.
- To further optimize safety, equipment and accessories should include: two-way radios, amphibious vehicles, winch on wheeled vehicles.
- Ice thickness may be measured with ice augers, at required distance intervals or using a ground-penetrating radar (GPR). This is important, since an ice cover can vary as much as 70% in thickness over a few hundred meters, and the minimum ice thickness is used to determine the bearing capacity of the entire ice cover.
- Borehole drilling may be used to collect cores of the ice, so as to appreciate its internal structure, e.g. white ice versus clear ice.

Snow cover removal is the first major operation in an ice road construction scheme. It may only begin once the ice thickness is safe to support the machinery used for that operation. There are two ways of doing it, depending on available equipment and state of practice for that particular road. One is to pack the snow layer with tracked vehicles into a thin layer, thereby increasing its density and reducing its insulating properties. The other is to remove it altogether, typically with vehicles fitted with a snowplow.

Once the ice has reached the target thickness (via accelerated growth after removing the insulating effects of the snow), road construction per se may commence. At that point, the ice is able to safely support the heavier equipment required for that phase, which mostly consists of artificial thickening using a pump or a spraying system. The aim is to bring the thickness up to what is required for the heaviest vehicles that are anticipated when the ice road opens.

== Usage and maintenance ==
Vehicles traveling on ice roads include ordinary automobiles and trucks of various sizes and weights. Standard winter tires are sufficient: in fact cleats and tire chains can damage the road surface. Tire chains may be stored in the vehicle for emergency purposes; they can also come in handy when traveling on a winter road with grades steeper than 8% on over-land segments. Signage may indicate speed limits, for instance a maximum of 25 km/h (16 mph), and spacing between vehicles, for instance 500 m (1,600 ft) for loads more than 12,500 kg (27,600 lb). These restrictions are to decrease the risks of damage to the ice cover, which would compromise its ability to support the weight it has been designed for.

Maintenance comprises two main tasks:

- Ice thickness monitoring: This can be done using drill holes or using ground-penetrating radar.
- Trafficability monitoring: The ice surface can deteriorate with usage. It can also get damaged by natural processes, such as ridging and fracturing, which are typically induced by sharp changes in air temperature.

== Road closure ==
An ice road will typically be closed as a result of deterioration of the running or operating surface, before there is any risk of ice cover failure. Surface deterioration can happen when the ice surface becomes too soft, or because of an excessive amount of meltwater on its surface. Mid-season road closures can also happen for similar reasons, and also because of inclement weather, such as a blizzard. If the ice road is part of a winter road, then closure can also be due to an over-land segment that has become unserviceable.

== Ice road reinforcement ==
An example of ice cover reinforcement, where four layers of stacked wooden logs were frozen into the ice (in, from a description provided in).

Ice crossings can be made to support higher loads if they are reinforced, and there are a number of ways this has been done in the past. Also, because these structures are vulnerable to a warming climate, which reduces their operational lifespan, they may benefit from reinforcement along problematic segments, such as creek crossings and where the winter road crosses a shoreline.

== Media references ==
- The 2008 film Frozen River tells the fictional story of two women who get involved with trafficking illegal immigrants from Canada into the United States by driving them across the frozen St. Lawrence River in their car.
- Canada's and Alaska's ice roads were prominently featured in the History Channel reality series Ice Road Truckers.
- The 2021 thriller film The Ice Road prominently features ice roads as truckers drive across northern Canada to deliver supplies after an explosion at a mine.

== See also ==
- Ice fishing and its ice paths
- Ice pier
- Ice racing
- Road of Life
- Snow road
- Tibbitt to Contwoyto Winter Road
- Winter road
