= John Colville =

John Colville may refer to:

- Sir John Colville (died 1394) (1337–1394), MP for Cambridgeshire
- John Colville, 9th Lord Colville of Culross (1768–1849), Royal Navy officer
- John Colville (c. 1540–1605), Commissioner to the Scots Parliament for Stirling, clergyman, judge, spy, outlaw and writer
- John Colville (Liberal politician) (1852–1901), father of Lord Clydesmuir, MP for North East Lanarkshire
- John Colville, 1st Baron Clydesmuir (1894–1954), Scottish Conservative politician, Governor of Bombay 1943–1948
- Jock Colville (1915–1987), English civil servant and diarist

== See also ==
- Sir John Coleville, a character in Shakespeare's play Henry IV, Part 2
- Colville (surname)
