= Colville (surname) =

Colville is a surname of Norman English origin. Notable people with the surname include:

- Alex Colville (1920–2013), Canadian painter
- Alexander Colville, 7th Lord Colville of Culross (1717–1770), British admiral
- Andrew Colville, London governor of the Hudson's Bay Company
- Bob Colville (born 1963), professional footballer
- Charles Colville (1770–1843), British military leader during the Peninsular War
- Christina Marshall Colville (1852–1936), Scottish temperance leader
- Maj.-Gen. Sir Henry Edward Colville (1852–1907), British military leader in Africa
- Jock Colville civil servant and diarist
- John Colville (disambiguation), the name of various persons
- Mac Colville (1916–2003), professional ice hockey player
- Mikael Colville-Andersen (born 1968), writer/director
- Neil Colville (1914–1987), professional ice hockey player
- Norman Colville (1893–1974), British Army officer and art collector
- Stanley Colville (1861–1939), British Royal Navy officer

== See also ==
- Colville, for related articles.
