= Colleville =

Colleville may refer to:

- Colleville, Seine-Maritime, Normandy, France
- Colleville-sur-Mer in Calvados, Normandy, France
- Colleville-Montgomery in Calvados, Normandy, France

== See also ==
- Coleville (disambiguation)
- Colville (disambiguation)
- Anne-Hyacinthe de Colleville (1761–1824), French novelist and dramatist
