= YCK =

YCK may refer to:

- Colville Lake Airport, IATA code
- Yio Chu Kang, a subzone of Ang Mo Kio Planning Area in Singapore
  - Yio Chu Kang MRT station (MRT station abbreviation), a mass rapid transit station in Ang Mo Kio, Singapore
- York City Knights, an English professional rugby league club
- A US Navy hull classification symbol: Open barge, wooden (YCK)
