= Colvile =

Colvile may refer to:

- SS Colvile, a Lake Winnipeg steamboat built for the Hudson's Bay Company
- Colvile (surname)

== See also ==
- Colville (disambiguation)
- Coalville
