= Snow road =

Type of road

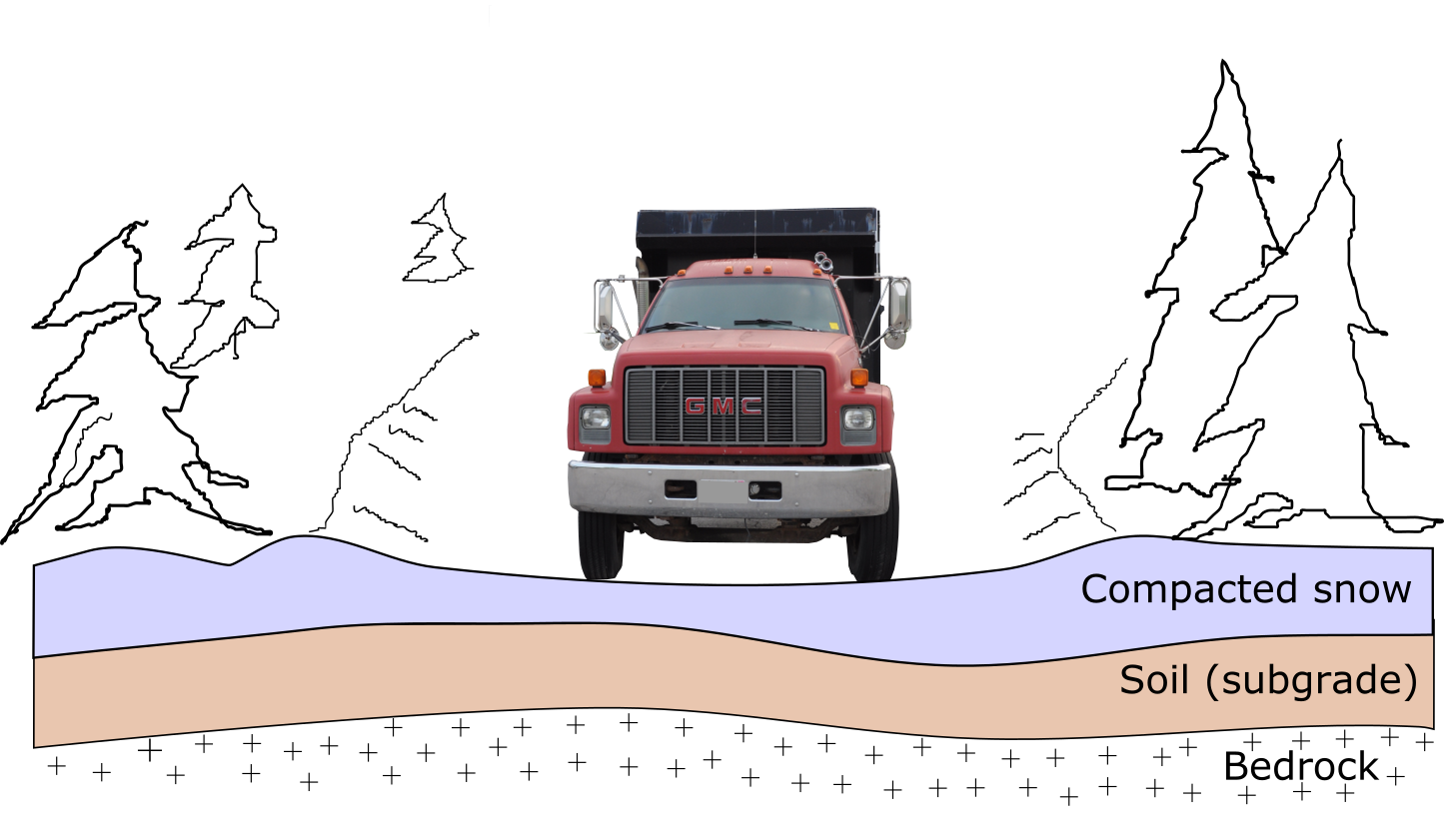
Simplified schematics of a snow road, i.e. compacted snow above a subgrade or, locally, over the bedrock.

A snow road is a type of winter road, which is a road that is used or trafficable only in the winter. Snow roads make up some or all of the on-land segments of a winter road. The snow is either compacted in place or, when there is not enough of it, is hauled from elsewhere, then compacted. The snow may be processed, for instance, by agitation to reduce the size of the particles before compaction. Additional snow is also used to help protect the vegetation and as a means of improving trafficability. This snow, sometimes referred to as 'snow pavement', can be compacted to various level, depending on requirements and available equipment – a higher compaction will accommodate heavier vehicles and higher tire pressures.

To increase the road's load capacity and its resistance to wear, water can be added onto the snow surface, resulting in a denser pavement and the formation of an ice cap. Ultimately, with a sufficient amount of flooding, an ice layer of significant thickness can be built, for a higher quality road in terms of effectiveness and load bearing capacity. Ice aggregate, typically collected from a nearby frozen lake, is also used on uneven terrain - it is flooded and allowed to freeze.

== History ==
Before the predominance of automobiles, some snowbelt towns compacted snow-covered primary roads to facilitate horse-drawn sleigh traffic. This was accomplished by pulling logs or large, heavy drums (called snow rollers) over new-fallen snow by a team of draft animals.

== See also ==
- Ice road

== Bibliography ==
- Abele, G., 1990. "Snow roads and runways", U.S. Army Cold Regions Research and Engineering Laboratory, Monograph 90-3, Washington, D.C.
- Adam, K.M., 1978. Building and operating winter roads in Canada and Alaska, Indian and Northern Affairs (INAC), Ottawa.
- Lang, R.M., Blaisdell, G.L., D'Urso, C., Reinemer, G. and Lesher, M., 1997. "Processing snow for high strength roads and runways", Cold Regions Science and Technology, 25: 17–31.
- Proskin, S., Groznic, E., Hayley, D., Mathison, F., McGregor, R. and Neth, V., 2011. Guidelines for the Construction and Operation of Winter Roads, Transportation Association of Canada.
- Russell-Head, D.S., Budd, W.F. and Moore, P.J., 1984. "Compacted snow as a pavement material for runway construction". Cold Regions Science and Technology, 9: 231–47.
