= Glam Sam and His Combo =

- Origin: Stockholm, Sweden
- Genres: Electronic, trip hop, downtempo, nu jazz, house, funk, disco. soul
- Years active: Since 2008
- Label: Lemongrassmusic
- Members: Mats Samuelsson
- Website: www.lemongrassmusic.de

Glam Sam and His Combo is a music project by Mats Samuelsson from Stockholm, Sweden, blending groovy music styles such as disco, jazz, funk, soul and lounge, to name a few.

== History ==
Mats Samuelsson, born in 1965 in Linköping, first played in an indie-jazz pop duo and then went back to university. Later on he has been working as journalist and free author. In 2008 he developed the idea of Glam Sam and His Combo as a jazzy-funky music project with himself acting as Glam Sam. The debut Groovy was released at Lemongrassmusic in 2009.

The German label discovered the Swedish producer and signed him immediately. The longplayer which unites elements of jazz, funk, rock, hip hop techno and disco sounds has received good critiques.

After the release of the single The Last Days of Disco, the second album The Paradise Groove was released in summer 2010 placing particular emphasis on serving the dancefloor. Critiques in many countries were all positive.

In January 2012, the EP The Riviera Sessions was released, containing more jazz and downtempo elements than the previous releases. Several EP releases followed, as well as a greatest hits compilation and then, in 2015, a new album called Stockholm City Soul emerged. Mr Glam Sam continued to release singles in the following years but focused more on his fiction writing.

In the beginning of 2023 he entered his Coolsville Sounds Studio again to produce tracks for his comeback. The cool and jazzy groove of Lost In The Art World was released on 10 March and immediately got airplay on quality soul and jazz stations in England such as Solar Radio and Jazz FM.

In the summer of 2025 Glam Sam and His Combo joined forces with UK singer-songwriter Angelina for a new collaboration.

The new songs soon got airplay on Jazz FM in the UK, Solar Radio (UK) and CJSW (Canada) to name a few. The music got rave reviews from bloggers and reviewers in England, France, Germany, USA, Brazil and Mexico, to name a few.

In the spring of 2026, Glam Sam and His Combo, together with Angelina, signed with the German label Lemon Jazz Records for a series of singles and an album. The long-player Talkin' In Colour was released on 19 June, both digitally and as a vinyl.

An instrumental EP, Instrumentals In Colour, followed during the summer of 2026, applauded by jazz critics. The EP got frequent radio play at Solar Radio and entered their Sweet Rhythms Chart. Up next: Glam Sam will remaster his ten most beloved classics on the album "Gosh! It's Glam Sam's Golden Greats!", to be released in October 2026.

== Discography ==
=== Albums ===
- 2009: Groovy! (Lemongrassmusic)
- 2010: The Paradise Groove (Lemongrassmusic)
- 2014: Feeling Groovy - Glam Sam's Greatest Hits (Lemongrassmusic)
- 2015: Stockholm City Soul (Lemongrassmusic)
- 2026: Talkin' in Colour (Lemon Jazz Records)

=== EPs ===
- 2012: The Riviera Sessions (Lemongrassmusic)
- 2012: The Brooklyn Sessions (Lemongrassmusic)
- 2013: The Coolsville Sessions (Lemongrassmusic)
- 2013: Disco Will Never Die (Lemongrassmusic)
- 2026: Instrumentals in Colour (Lemon Jazz Records)

=== Singles ===
- 2010: The Last Days of Disco feat. Biker Boy (Lemongrassmusic)
- 2017: Modern Classics, Vol. 1 (Coolsville Sounds)
- 2017: Modern Classics, Vol. 2 (Coolsville Sounds)
- 2017: Modern Classics, Vol. 3 (Coolsville Sounds)
- 2018: Fly Cool, Fly High (Coolsville Sounds)
- 2020: The Concept of the Boogie (Coolsville Sounds)
- 2020: Back from the Future (Coolsville Sounds)
- 2023: Lost in the Art World (Coolsville Sounds)
- 2023: Private Detective Funk (Coolsville Sounds)
- 2023: Live and Shine (Coolsville Sounds)
- 2024: The Challenge (Coolsville Sounds)
- 2026: Runaway Trains (the Riviera Jazz Groove) (Lemon Jazz Records)
- 2026: Fingertips (Lemon Jazz Records)
- 2026: Sweet Summer Nights (Lemon Jazz Records)
- 2026: I Talk in Colour (the Disco Jazz Explosion) (Lemon Jazz Records)
- 2026: I Talk in Colour (the Brixton Jazz Edit) (Lemon Jazz Records)
- 2026: I Talk in Colour (the Brixton Jazz Instrumental) (Lemon Jazz Records)
- 2026: I Talk in Colour (the Disco Jazz Instrumental) (Lemon Jazz Records)
- 2026: Shining (Lemon Jazz Records)
