= Colville Lake, Northwest Territories =

Colville Lake K'áhbamį́túé
- Settlement Corporation
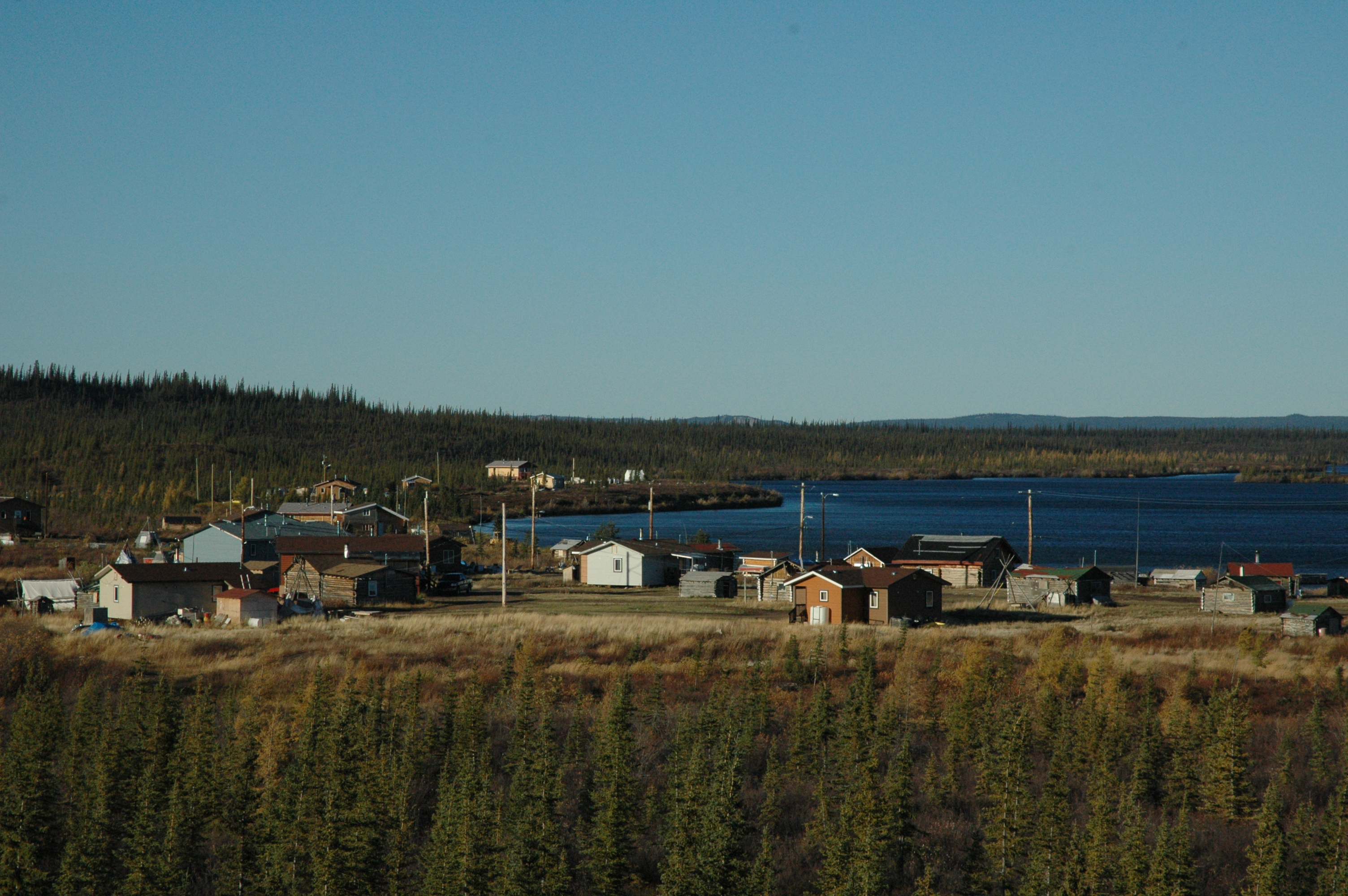

- Location within Northwest Territories Location within Canada
- Coordinates: 67°02′18″N 126°05′32″W
- Country: Canada
- Territory: Northwest Territories
- Region: Sahtu
- Settlement area: Sahtu
- Constituency: Sahtu
- First Nation (Designated Authority): 30 November 1995

Government
  - Chief: Wilbert Kochon
  - Senior Administrative Officer: Joseph Kochon
  - MLA: Daniel McNeely

Area
  - Land: 128.39 km^{2} (49.57 sq mi)
- Elevation: 259 m (850 ft)

Population (2016)
  - Total: 129
  - Density: 1/km^{2} (2.6/sq mi)
- Time zone: UTC−07:00 (MST)
  - Summer (DST): UTC−06:00 (MDT)
- Canadian Postal code: X0E 1L0
- Area code: 867
- Telephone exchange: 709
- Living cost: 182.5^{A}
- Food price index: 196.3^{B}
- Sources: Department of Municipal and Community Affairs, Prince of Wales Northern Heritage Centre, Canada Flight Supplement^A2013 figure based on Edmonton = 100^B2015 figure based on Yellowknife = 100

Colville Lake (K'áhbamį́túé meaning "ptarmigan net place") is a settlement corporation located in the Sahtu Region of the Northwest Territories, Canada. The community is located 50 km (31 mi) north of the Arctic Circle, on a lake of the same name, and is northeast of Norman Wells. This settlement is the administrative office of the Behdzi Ahda band government. The community is likely named for Hudson's Bay Company Governor Andrew Colvile.

== Demographics ==
Federal census population history of Colville Lake
Year	Pop.	±%
1976	56	—
1981	57	+1.8%
1986	52	−8.8%
1991	69	+32.7%
1996	90	+30.4%
2001	102	+13.3%
2006	126	+23.5%
2011	149	+18.3%
2016	129	−13.4%
2021	110	−14.7%
Source: Statistics Canada

Annual population estimates

Year	Pop.	±%
1996	89	—
1997	96	+7.9%
1998	96	+0.0%
1999	108	+12.5%
2000	107	−0.9%
2001	115	+7.5%
2002	118	+2.6%
2003	122	+3.4%
2004	126	+3.3%
2005	126	+0.0%
2006	131	+4.0%

Year	Pop.	±%
2007	141	+7.6%
2008	145	+2.8%
2009	153	+5.5%
2010	152	−0.7%
2011	151	−0.7%
2012	155	+2.6%
2013	156	+0.6%
2014	159	+1.9%
2015	162	+1.9%
2016	161	−0.6%
2017	159	−1.2%

Sources: NWT Bureau of Statistics (2001–2017)

In the 2021 Census of Population conducted by Statistics Canada, Colville Lake had a population of 110 living in 30 of its 43 total private dwellings, a change of −14.7% from its 2016 population of 129. With a land area of 126.14 km^{2} (48.70 sq mi), it had a population density of 0.9/km^{2} (2.3/sq mi) in 2021.

The GNWT has reported that the majority, 148 people, were Indigenous, Sahtu Dene. They are represented by the Behdzi Ahda' First Nation and belong to the Sahtu Dene Council

== Geography and climate ==
Colville Lake is located 745 km (463 mi) by air, northwest of Yellowknife. The terrain is characterized by black spruce and tends to be small and sparse. Other vegetation includes mosses, lichens, grasses and alders. The winter months begin in October and last until April. The month of May is considered the spring or breakup period. By the end of May or early June the lakes and rivers are normally free of ice, although this varies. June, July and August are considered the summer months and temperatures range in the mid twenties. At times the temperature has climbed into the low thirties. By late September, freeze up is well underway again.

== History ==
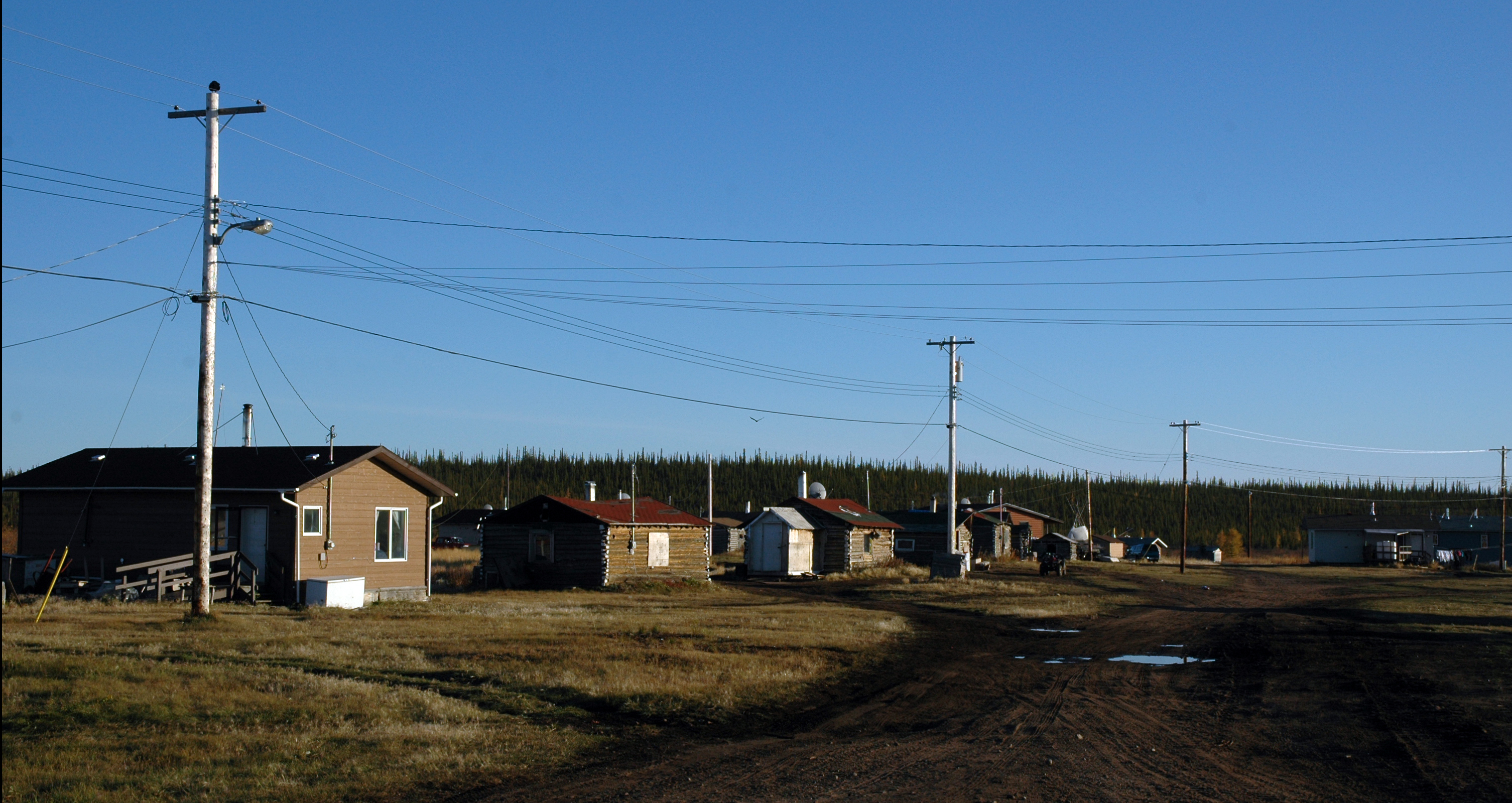
The community in autumn

The community of Colville Lake is the ancestral homeland of the Hareskin (Sahtu) Dene who still inhabit the area. The Hareskin Dene were never very numerous, with a population of less than one thousand people, living in six or seven bands, at the time of European contact. The Hareskins were a peaceful group, known for their use of small animals such as the Arctic hare. Located within the traditional homeland of the North Slave Dene tribe, Colville Lake is a completely traditional community in every sense. Although Father Émile Petitot brought Christianity to the area in 1864, organization of the community did not occur until 1962 when a Roman Catholic mission was established by Bern Will Brown. Brown came north from US in 1948 as a priest, then as painter and bush pilot.

In September 2025, Our Lady of the Snows, the local Catholic church, was destroyed by fire.

== Today ==
One main attraction is a fishing lodge. Colville Lake is home to grayling, trout and pike fish. There is also a small art gallery and museum located next to the lodge. Rounding off the town, there is a bed and breakfast and a retail store.

== Services ==
Kapami Co-op is the only food retailer and hosts the post office for the community. Locals either resort to hunting, purchasing food flown in or drive to Norman Wells or Fort Good Hope when winter roads are in use.

Colville Lake School is the only school providing K-12 education needs. The main log building houses junior grades and portable for older students.

The community has a basic health station staffed by a nurse with telehealth access from Norman Wells. Medivac transfer for patients when advance care is required either to Norman Wells (health clinic) or Yellowknife (Stanton Territorial Hospital).

There is no local policing and only month patrol from RCMP detachment in Fort Good Hope.

Colville Lake had no fire services and became a concern after 2014 fire and previous fires were left to burn out. Since then the community is staffed by a single mini pumper.

== Transportation ==
Colville Lake/Tommy Kochon Aerodrome is located outside the community. The airport connects with Fort Good Hope and Norman Wells only.

Within the community is Colville Lake Water Aerodrome, also known as Colville Lake Seaplane Base, using the lake as landing area. This facility is owned and operated by Kapami Coop with the help of Arctic Co-operatives Limited.

The old airstrip is located inside Coville Lake with old runway (10/28) still visible. Since closing in 2012 solar panels have been built at end of the former runway to provide alternate power supply to Colville Lake.

Roads in Colville Lake provide local access only. A winter road connects with Fort Good Hope for about 4-5 months of the year.

== See also ==
- Colville Lake/Tommy Kochon Aerodrome
- Colville Lake Water Aerodrome
