= Colvile (surname) =

Colvile is a surname. Notable persons with that surname include:

- Andrew Wedderburn Colvile (also spelled Colville) (1779–1856), governor of the Hudson's Bay Company
- Charles Colvile (born 1955), British cricket commentator
- Charles Robert Colvile (1815–1886), British MP
- Eden Colvile (1819–1893), governor of the Hudson's Bay Company
- James William Colvile (1810–1880), British judge
- Oliver Colvile (1959–2025), British MP
