= Winter road =

Seasonal road on frozen terrain

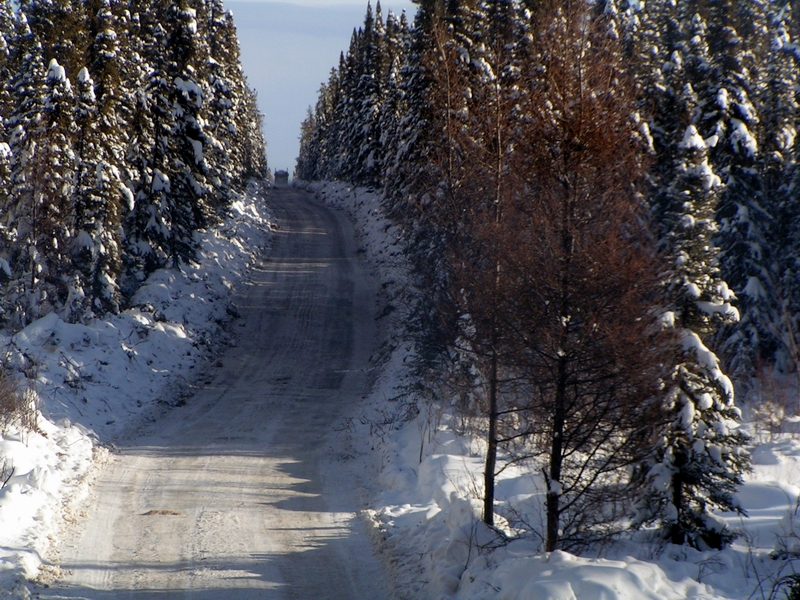
Example of an over-land segment along a winter road, in northern British Columbia

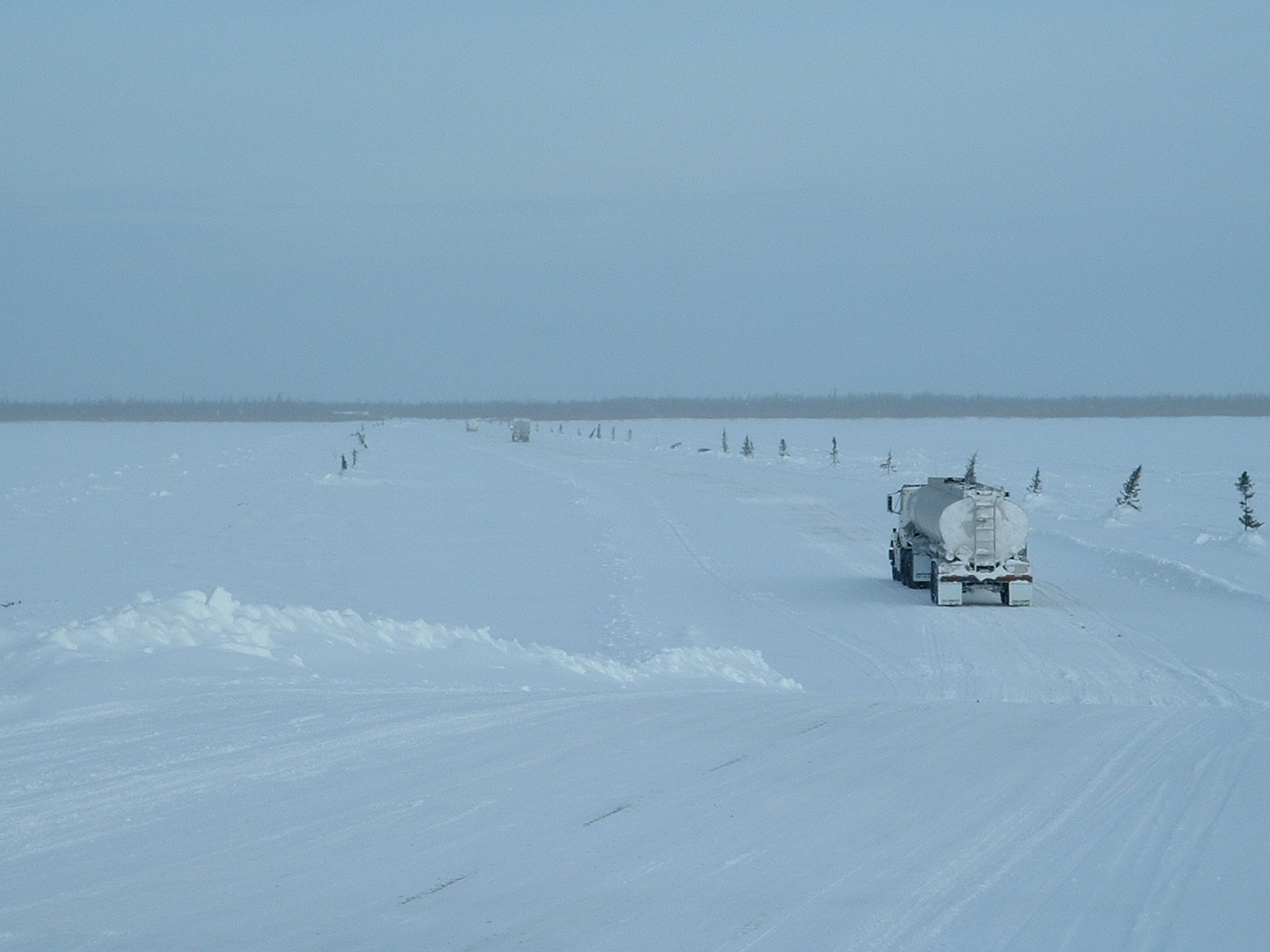
Example of an over-ice segment, here crossing the frozen Albany River in Northern Ontario

A winter road is a seasonal road only usable during the winter, i.e. it has to be re-built every year. This road typically runs over land and over frozen lakes, rivers, swamps, and sea ice. Segments of a winter road that cross an expanse of floating ice are also referred to as an ice road or an ice bridge.

The foundations underlying over-land segments is most often native soil or muskeg frozen to a given depth, and locally, bedrock. These surfaces may either be bare or are overlain, as is most commonly the case, with a snow cover. Over-ice segments of winter roads are often referred to as ice crossings, ice bridges or, simply, ice roads. The weight of the vehicle is supported by the buoyancy of the floating ice and by its resistance to flexure. Where a winter road is built mostly on floating ice, the occasional land crossings are called "portages" – the Tibbitt to Contwoyto Winter Road is an example.

Winter roads facilitate transportation during the winter to, from and within isolated areas in Northern Canada where there are no permanent (also called 'all-weather' or 'all-season') roads. They enable supplies (e.g. food, fuel, construction material) to be brought into communities in these areas. The only other alternative, providing there is a small airstrip nearby, would be to rely on air transportation. However, this can be prohibitively costly, especially for bulk material. In some areas, climate change is observed to affect winter roads, notably by contributing to a significant reduction in their operational lifespan.

== See also ==
- Ice road
- Snow road
