= Anne-Hyacinthe de Colleville =

French novelist and dramatist (1761–1824)

Anne-Hyacinthe de Saint-Léger de Colleville
- Born: 26 March 1761; Paris, France
- Died: 18 September 1824 (aged 63); Le Pré-Saint-Gervais, Paris, France

Anne-Hyacinthe de Saint-Léger de Colleville (26 March 1761 – 18 November 1824) was a French novelist and dramatist.

== Works ==
Novels

- 1781: Lettres du chevalier de saint Alme et de Mlle de Melcourt
- 1782: Alexandrine ou l'amour est une vertu
- 1802: MMe de M***, ou la rentière
- 1804: Victor de Martigues
- 1806: Salut à MM. les maris ou, Rose et d'Orsinval
- 1816: Coralie

Plays

- 1783: Le Bouquet du père de famille
- 1783: Les deux sœurs
- 1788: Sophie et Derville
