= Colville River =

Colville River may refer to:

- Colville River (Alaska) in the state of Alaska United States
  - Colville Delta, Alaska
- Colville River (Washington) in the state of Washington in the United States
