= Colville Lake (Northwest Territories) =

Lake in the Northwest Territories, Canada

- Location within Northwest Territories
- Location: Sahtu Region, Northwest Territories, Canada
- Coordinates: 67°10′N 126°0′W
- Basin countries: Canada
- Surface area: 455 km^{2} (176 sq mi)
- Surface elevation: 245 m (804 ft)
- Settlements: Colville Lake, Northwest Territories

Colville Lake is the 20th largest lake in Canada's Northwest Territories. The lake is located 100 km (62 mi) northwest of Great Bear Lake in the Sahtu Region. The lake has a perimeter of 121 km (75 mi) and a net area of 416 km^{2} (161 sq mi) and a total area of 439 km^{2} (169 sq mi).

The only community on the lake, Colville Lake, which is the Sahtu Dene village of 126 and is located on the southeast shore, along with Colville Lake/Tommy Kochon Aerodrome and Colville Lake Water Aerodrome. Like the community it is named for Andrew Colvile.

== See also ==
- List of lakes in the Northwest Territories
