= Coalville (disambiguation) =

Coalville is a town in Leicestershire, England. Coalville may also refer to:

- Coalville, a housing estate at Weston Coyney, Stoke-on-Trent, England
- Coalville, Iowa, a census-designated place in the United States
- Coalville, Utah, a small city in the United States
- Coalville, Victoria, Australia
