= Kenn Borek Air =

Airline based in Calgary, Alberta, Canada

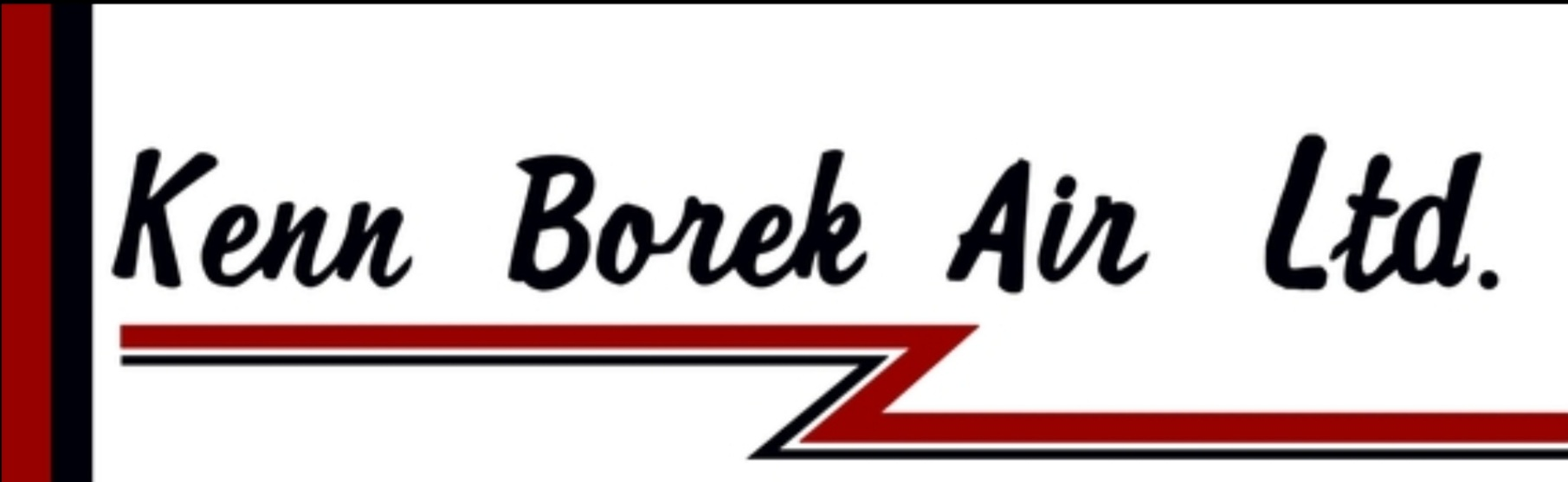

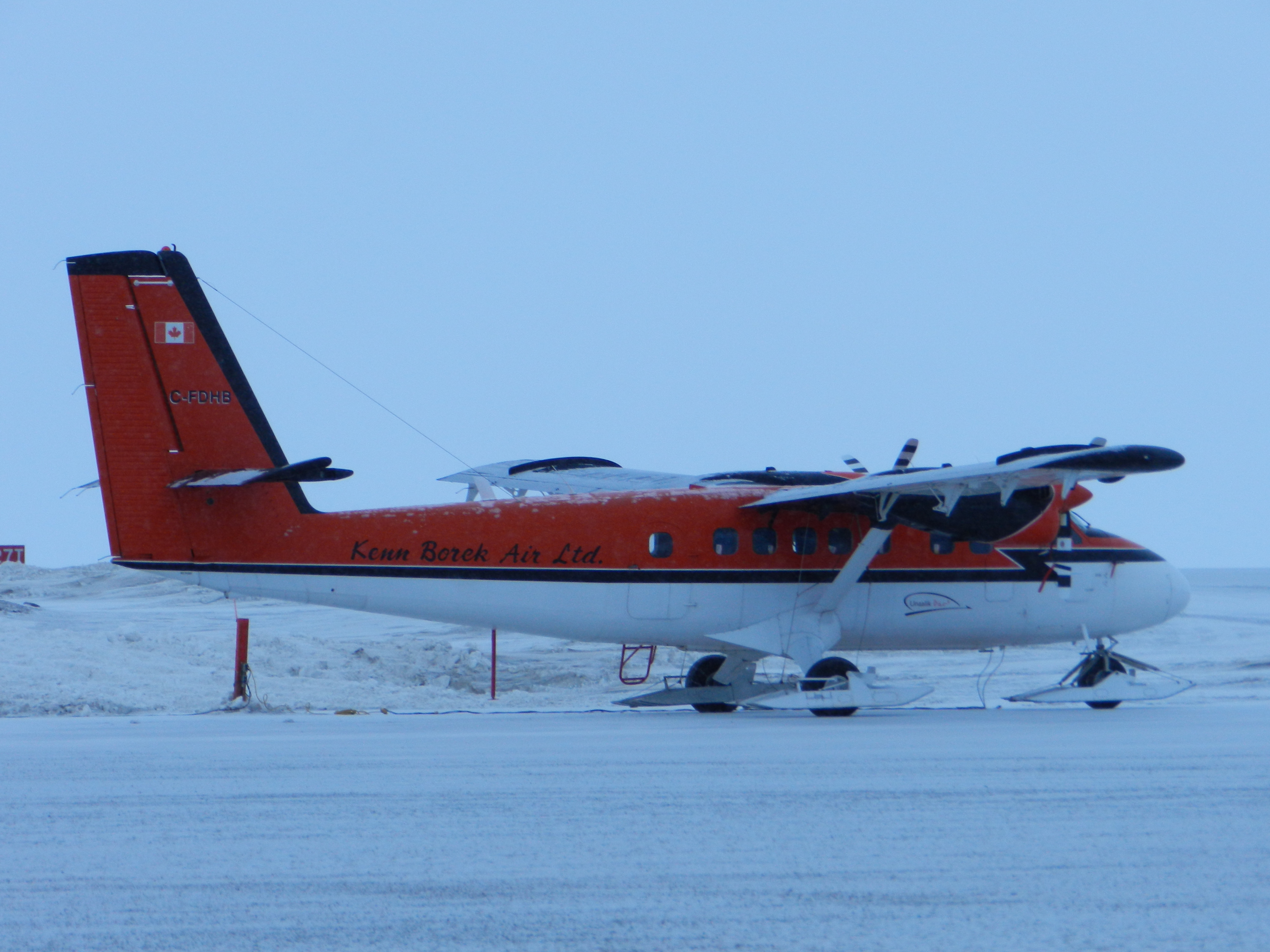
- Ken Borek Air de Havilland Canada DHC-6 Twin Otter
IATA	ICAO	Call sign
4K	KBA	BOREK AIR
- Founded: 1966 (as Vic Turner Ltd)
- AOC #: Canada: 2273; United States: WJKF060F
- Hubs: Calgary International Airport
- Fleet size: 35
- Destinations: 5 (as Aklak Air)
- Parent company: Kenn Borek Air Ltd.
- Headquarters: Calgary, Alberta
- Key people: Brian Crocker, Operations Manager; Wallace Dobchuk, Chief Pilot
- Website: www.borekair.com

Kenn Borek Air is an airline based in Calgary, Alberta, Canada. It operates regional passenger and cargo services, contract operations in the Arctic and Antarctic and aircraft leasing. Its main base is at Calgary International Airport. It charters aircraft for scientific expeditions, oil exploration, etc., and operates air ambulance services.

== History ==
The airline was established in 1966 as Vic Turner Ltd which operated a single de Havilland Canada DHC-6 Twin Otter providing air support for oil exploration activities in the Canadian Arctic. Renamed Kenn Borek Air after being purchased by Borek Construction in 1971, the company acquired the Aklavik Flying Services which was founded in April 1947 by Michael Zubko operating a single Aeronca Champion at that time. In 1975 Kenn Borek acquired Kenting Atlas Aviation. Kenting Atlas Aviation had been formed in 1972 with the purchase of Weldy Phipps's Atlas Aviation (established in 1962) by Kenting Aviation. This was the second iteration of the Atlas Aviation name, the first evolving out of the renaming of McGuire Flying School at Uplands Airport, Ottawa, Ontario formed in 1946 by Hugh McGuire.

The company has been operating in Antarctica since 1985.

On 26 April 2001, Kenn Borek Air used a DHC-6 Twin Otter aircraft to rescue Dr. Ronald Shemenski from the Amundsen–Scott South Pole Station. This was the first ever rescue from the South Pole during the southern winter. To achieve the range necessary for this flight, the Twin Otter was equipped with a special ferry tank.

In 2009, the company was commissioned to recover a crashed aircraft in the Antarctic, and employees spent 25 days in a makeshift camp to complete the project.

The airline was used by the BBC during the filming of the documentary Frozen Planet (2011), which was narrated by David Attenborough, and one of its planes is seen in portions of the footage.

In June 2016 the company assisted in removing two sick workers from Antarctica during the polar winter. Two Twin Otter aircraft were used and successfully completed the mission. The crew, captain Wally Dobchuk, first officer Sebastian Trudel and maintenance engineer Michael McCrae were honoured for their heroism by Aviation Week.

In 2020 one of the airline's converted DC-3s was used by NASA to drop probes along Greenland's Atlantic coast, as part of the NASA's annual Oceans Melting Greenland project. The project is intended to monitor the rate at which Greenland's ice cap melts into the sea.

== Operations ==
Kenn Borek Air offers a full service overhaul maintenance hangar in Calgary with routine maintenance being completed wherever the aircraft is located.

In the months from September to March it operates significantly in Presidente Carlos Ibáñez del Campo International Airport in Punta Arenas, Chile. Flights to Antarctica depart from there.

== Destinations ==
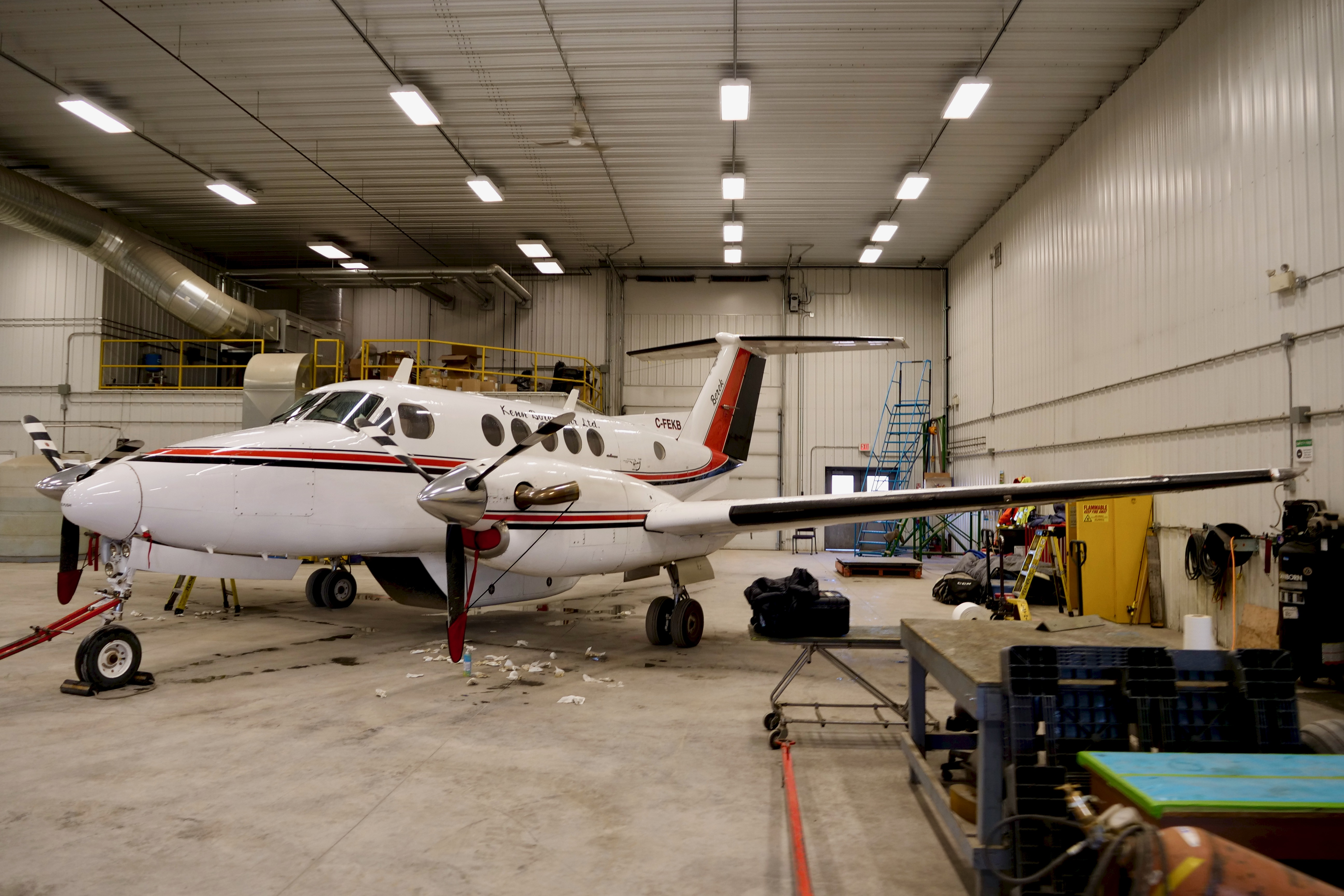
Kenn Borek Air - King Air 200 C-FEKB

As of March 2025, Kenn Borek operates scheduled services to several communities in the Northwest Territories as Aklak Air:

- Fort McPherson (Fort McPherson Airport only when the ice road is closed or the ferry is not in operation)
- Inuvik (Inuvik (Mike Zubko) Airport)
- Paulatuk (Paulatuk (Nora Aliqatchialuk Ruben) Airport)
- Sachs Harbour (Sachs Harbour (David Nasogaluak Jr. Saaryuaq) Airport)
- Ulukhaktok (Ulukhaktok/Holman Airport)

== Fleet ==
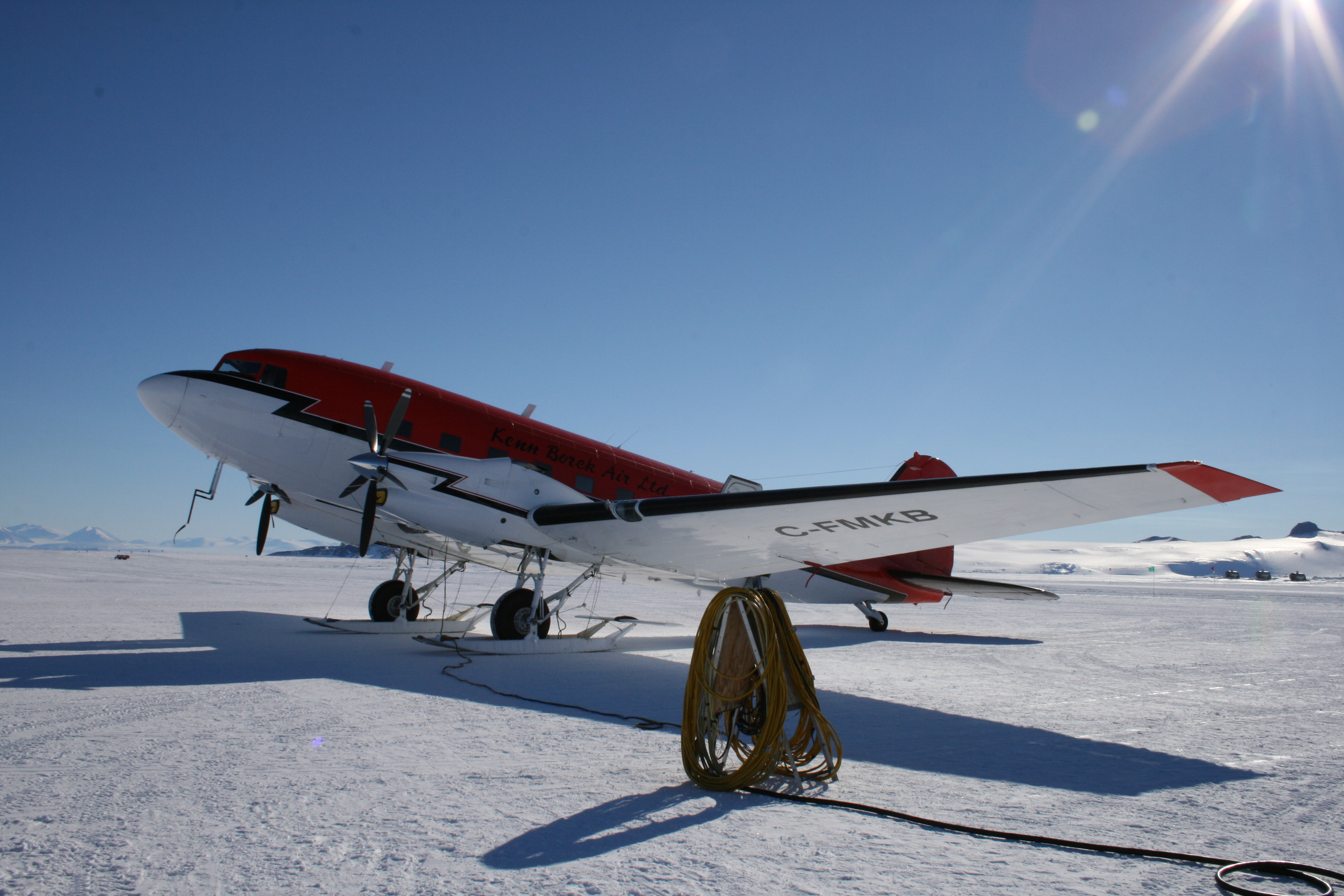
Basler BT-67 at Williams Field, Antarctica

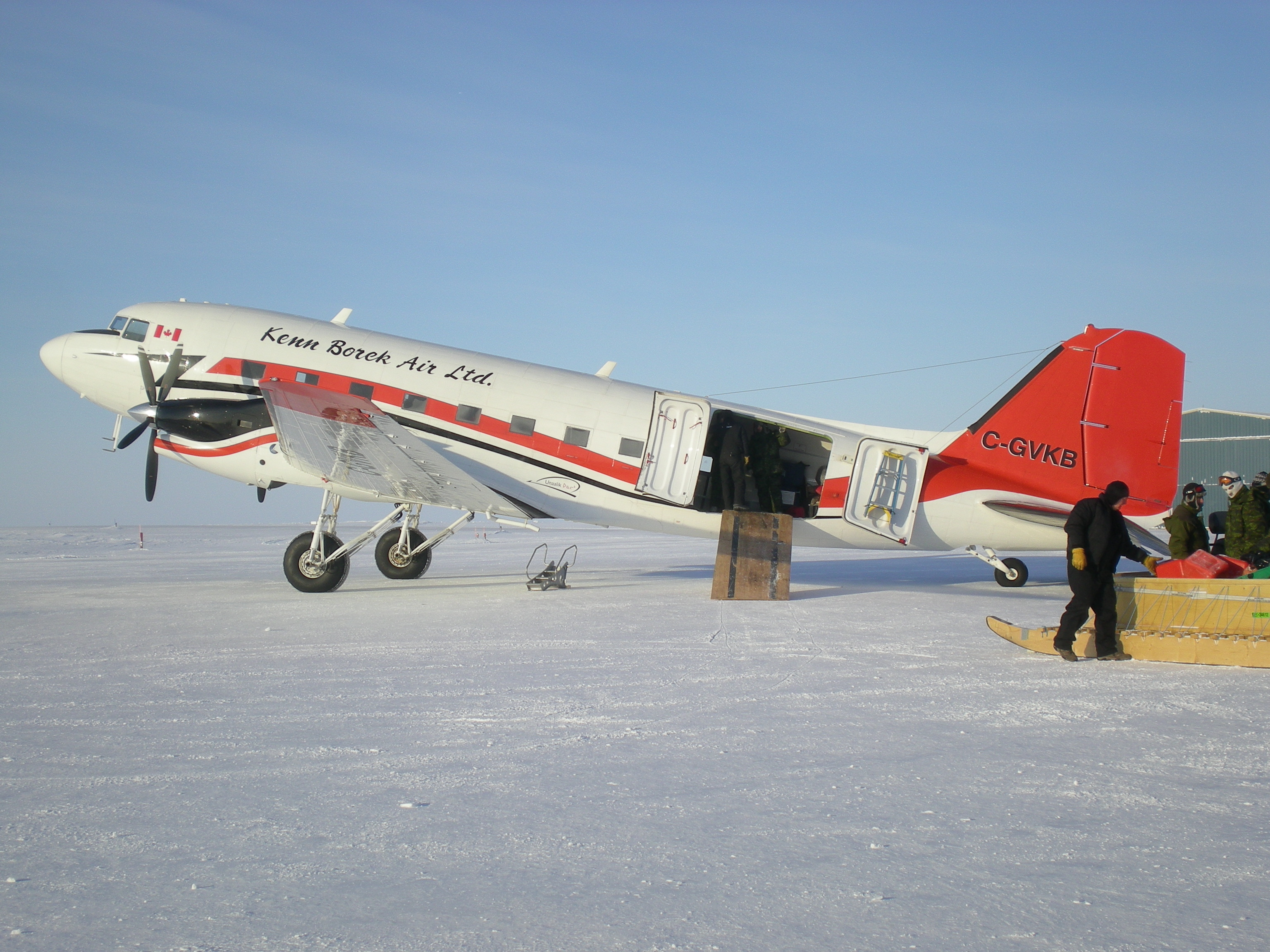
Loading at Cambridge Bay

As of July 2025, Kenn Borek Air has the following aircraft registered with Transport Canada.

Kenn Borek Air
Aircraft	No. of aircraft	Variants	Notes
Beechcraft 1900	2	1900D	Aklak Air operates one of the 1900D
Beechcraft Super King Air	4	2 - Model B200; 1 - Model B200GT; 1 - Model B300	Aklak Air operates two King Airs
de Havilland Canada DHC-6 Twin Otter	19	2 - DHC-6 Series 100; 17 - DHC-6 Series 300	Aklak Air operates two or three of the Twin Otters on a seasonal basis
Douglas DC-3	10	8 - DC-3C; 2 - DC-3A-S1C3G, DC3C-S4C4G	Basler BT-67 turboprops. The Basler is used by Aklak Air on a seasonal basis
Total	35		

=== Former fleet ===
In addition to multiple instances of the aircraft listed above Kenn Borek has also operated the following aircraft and variants:

- Beechcraft King Air
  - Beech 90
    - Model B90
    - Model C90
  - Beech 100
    - Model 100
    - Model A100
- Beechcraft Baron
  - 95-B55
- Beechcraft Model 99
  - 99A
  - B99A
- Beechcraft Super King Air
  - Super King Air 200
  - Model B200GT
- Bell 206
  - Bell 206B
- Cessna 150
  - 150G
- Cessna 152
- Cessna 185 Skywagon
  - A185F Skywagon
- de Havilland Canada DHC-4 Caribou
  - DHC-4A Caribou
- Douglas C-54 Skymaster
  - C-54G
- Douglas R4D-8
- Embraer EMB 110 Bandeirante
  - EMB 110P1
- Piper PA-31 Navajo
  - PA-31T3

== Accidents and incidents ==
- On 28 February 1977, Douglas C-47A C-FIQR crashed near Salluit (then known as Sugluk), Quebec. The aircraft was not repairable and was used for parts.
- On 21 December 1977, DHC-6 C-FABW crashed near Nanisivik Airport, Nunavut. Damaged beyond repair. Two crew and six passengers were killed. Probable cause was a flap rod failure.
- On 18 September 1978, Douglas C-47A C-FCRW was damaged beyond economic repair in a landing accident at Komakuk Beach, Yukon.
- On 7 May 1982, Douglas C-47A C-FQHF overran the runway at Calgary International Airport following an aborted take-off. The aircraft was damaged beyond economic repair.
- In May 1982, DHC-6 C-GKBO broke through the polar ice after landing at the North Pole with a group of tourists. All onboard evacuated safely and were rescued by another aircraft, however the Twin Otter had sunk out of sight within six hours of the accident.
- On 10 November 1987, DHC-4A Caribou aircraft C-GVYX, crashed near Ross River, Yukon, two crew were killed.
- On 25 October 2010, Beechcraft King Air C-FAFD en route from Edmonton City Centre to Kirby Lake Aerodrome (CFR4, (55°21′20″N 110°38′15″W), crashed 1.5 nautical miles (2.8 km; 1.7 mi) southeast of Conklin. One of the ten occupants on board was killed, four were seriously injured.
- On 4 November 2010, a hangar fire at Inuvik (Mike Zubko) Airport destroyed three aircraft owned by Kenn Borek Air and operated by Aklak Air. They were de Havilland Canada DHC-6 Twin Otter C-GZVH, Beechcraft King Air C-GHOC and Beechcraft 99 C-FKBK.
- On 23 January 2013, an Emergency Locator Transmitter (ELT) activated in Antarctica, in the Queen Alexandra Range. On board C-GKBC (c/n:650), the DHC-6 Twin Otter, that was equipped with skis, were three Canadians. The plane, operating under the auspices of the Italian National Agency for New Technologies, Energy and Sustainable Economic Development (ENEA), had been en route from the United States Amundsen–Scott South Pole Station to the Italian Zucchelli Station, located at Terra Nova Bay. The aircraft was found on 25 January 2013. It had impacted Mount Elizabeth at the 13,000 ft (4,000 m) level. The New Zealand helicopter rescue team which spotted the wreckage reported that the accident was not survivable.
