= Aklak Air =

Canadian airline

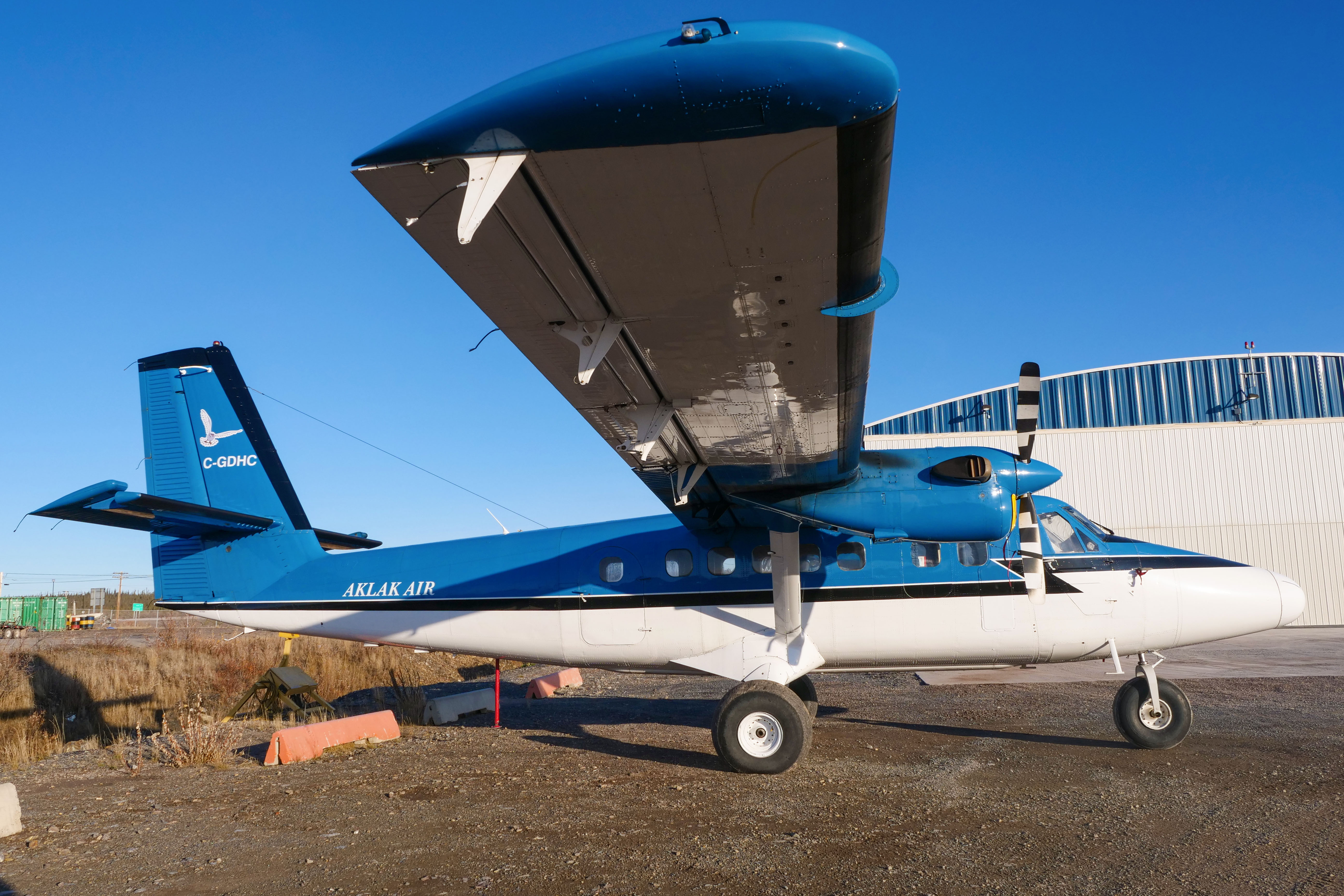
- A Twin Otter at Inuvik
IATA	ICAO	Call sign
6L	—	—
- Founded: 1977
- AOC #: 2273
- Fleet size: 7
- Destinations: 5
- Parent company: Inuvialuit Joint Venture Company / Kenn Borek Air
- Headquarters: Inuvik, Northwest Territories
- Website: www.aklakair.ca

Aklak Air is an Inuvialuit owned airline based in Inuvik in Northwest Territories in Canada. It operates year-round and seasonal scheduled services, as well as charter flights throughout the western Arctic. Its main base is Inuvik (Mike Zubko) Airport.

== History ==
The airline was established in 1977 and started operations in 1978. In June 1994, Aklak Air and Kenn Borek Air set up a joint venture, under the terms of which Aklak Air has access to Kenn Borek Air's fleet as and when required. Aklak Air is wholly owned by Inuvialuit Joint Venture Company.

== Aircraft ==
Aklak Air aircraft
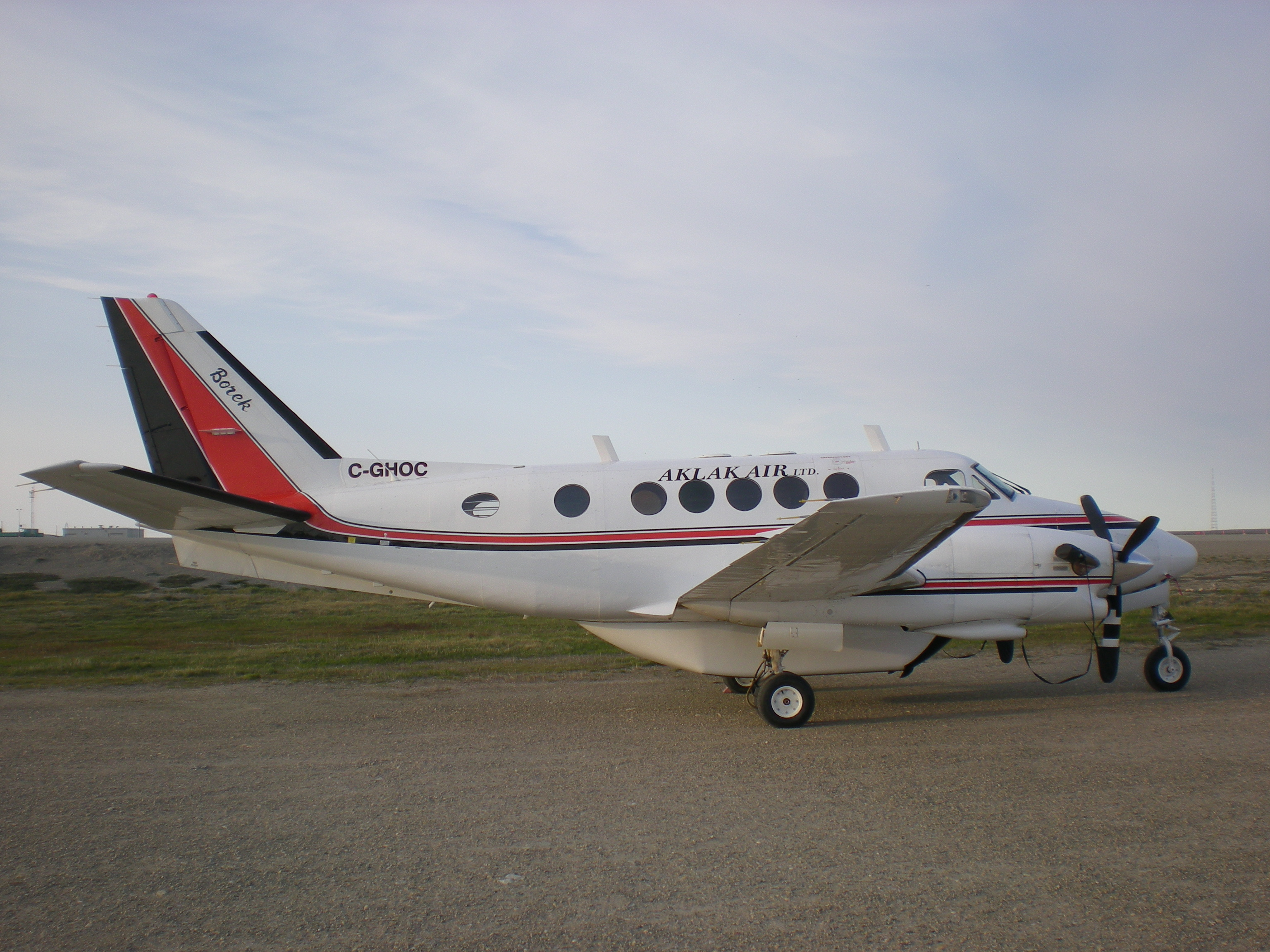
A King Air of Kenn Borek Air in Aklak Air colours at the North Warning System hangar, Cambridge Bay Airport

Kenn Borek / Aklak Air King Air 200 at Sachs Harbour (David Nasogaluak Jr. Saaryuaq) Airport

View of the cockpit while departing taking off from Eureka Aerodrome, Nunavut

== Destinations ==
As of 11 October 2026, Aklak operates scheduled services to several communities in the Northwest Territories:

Province/territory	City	Airport	Notes
Northwest Territories	Aklavik	Aklavik/Freddie Carmichael Airport	Seasonal when ice road is closed
Northwest Territories	Fort McPherson	Fort McPherson Airport	Only when the ice road is closed or the Mackenzie River ferry is not in operation
Northwest Territories	Inuvik	Inuvik (Mike Zubko) Airport	
Northwest Territories	Paulatuk	Paulatuk (Nora Aliqatchialuk Ruben) Airport	
Northwest Territories	Sachs Harbour	Sachs Harbour (David Nasogaluak Jr. Saaryuaq) Airport	
Northwest Territories	Ulukhaktok	Ulukhaktok Airport	

== Fleet ==
As of 11 October 2026, Aklak Air, through Kenn Borek Air has the following aircraft registered with Transport Canada.

Kenn Borek Air
Aircraft	No. of aircraft	Variants	Notes
Beechcraft 1900	1	1900D	
Beechcraft Super King Air	2	Model B200, Model B200GT	
de Havilland Canada DHC-6 Twin Otter	3	DHC-6 Series 100, DHC-6 Series 300	Aklak Air operates two or three of the Twin Otters on a seasonal basis
Douglas DC-3	1	Basler BT-67	The Basler is used by Aklak Air on a seasonal basis
Total	7		

== Accidents and incidents ==
- On 22 September 1989, a Piper PA-31T Cheyenne, registered C-GBDH, stalled while making a turn on approach at Sachs Harbour, Northwest Territories. All five occupants on board were killed. The crash was caused by the pilot failing to maintain airspeed while on approach.
- On 4 November 2010, a hangar fire at Inuvik (Mike Zubko) Airport destroyed three aircraft operated by Aklak Air. They were de Havilland Canada DHC-6 Twin Otter C-GZVH, Beechcraft King Air C-GHOC and Beechcraft 99 C-FKBK.
