= Thesiger Bay =

Bay in the Northwest Territories, Canada

Hadley Bay
- Location within Northwest Territories
- Location: Viscount Melville Sound
- Coordinates: 71°30′01″N 124°05′10″W
- River sources: Masik River
- Ocean/sea sources: Arctic Ocean
- Basin countries: Canada
- Settlements: Sachs Harbour

Thesiger Bay is a Canadian Arctic waterway in the Northwest Territories. It is an arm of the Beaufort Sea on southwestern Banks Island. The Masik River empties into Thesiger Bay.

The bay is approximately 5 km (3.1 mi) south of Sachs Harbour.

Ringed seal frequent the area.
