= Sachs Harbour (David Nasogaluak Jr. Saaryuaq) Airport =

Airport in the Northwest Territories, Canada

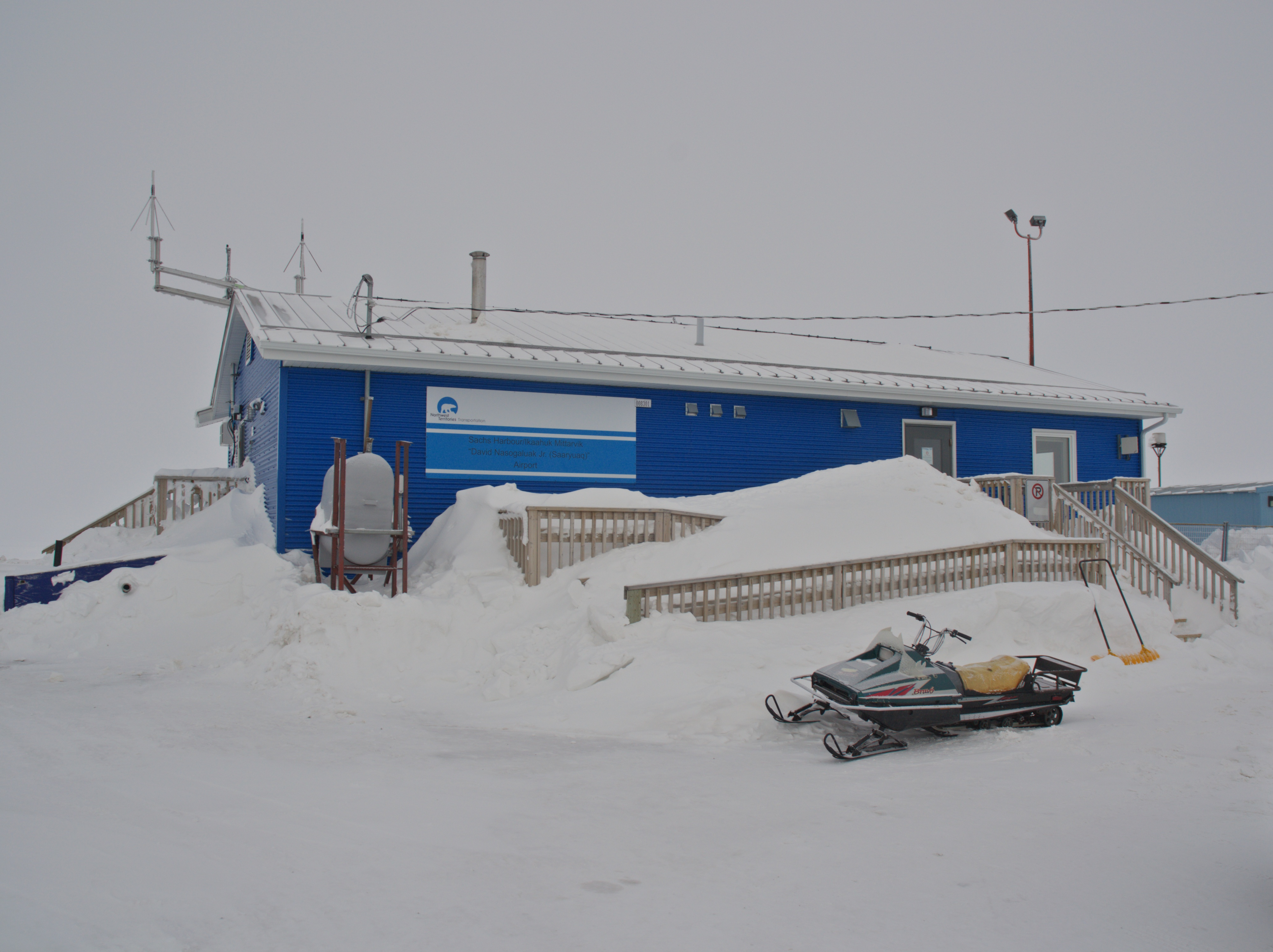
- Airport terminal
- IATA: YSY; ICAO: CYSY; WMO: 71467

Summary
- Airport type: Public
- Operator: Government of the Northwest Territories
- Location: Sachs Harbour, Northwest Territories
- Time zone: Northwest Territories Time (UTC−06:00)
- Elevation AMSL: 283 ft (86 m)
- Coordinates: 71°59′37″N 125°14′29″W

Map
- Location in the Northwest Territories CYSY (Canada)

Runways
Direction	Length		Surface
Direction	ft	m	Surface
08/26	4,002	1,220	Gravel

Statistics (2010)
- Aircraft movements: 62
- Sources: Canada Flight Supplement; Environment Canada; Movements from Statistics Canada.

Sachs Harbour (David Nasogaluak Jr. Saaryuaq) Airport (IATA: YSY, ICAO: CYSY) is located at Sachs Harbour, Northwest Territories, Canada. Pilots will need to bring their own pump if they require 100LL fuel.

The current terminal building opened in 2011, replacing the previous terminal built in 1981.

== Airlines and destinations ==
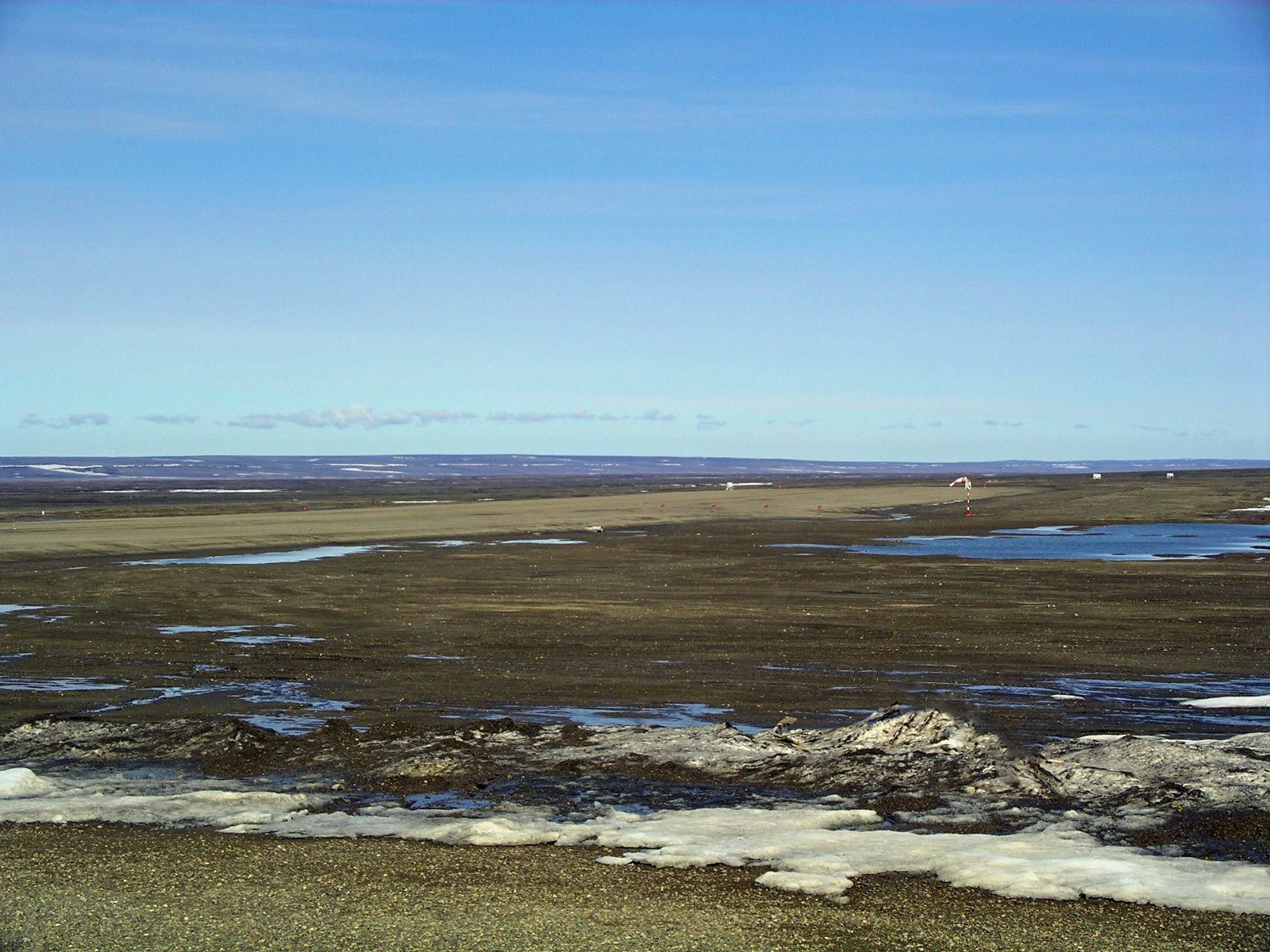
Looking down the airport's only runway, 08/26

Airlines	Destinations
Kenn Borek Air operated by Aklak Air	Inuvik, Ulukhaktok
