= CYPC =

CYPC may refer to:

- Paulatuk (Nora Aliqatchialuk Ruben) Airport, Northwest Territories, Canada, ICAO irport code CYPC
- China Yangtze Power Co. Ltd., a Chinese utilities company
