= Fort McPherson, Northwest Territories =

Fort McPherson Teetł'it Zheh (Gwichʼin) The heart of the Gwichʼin
- Hamlet
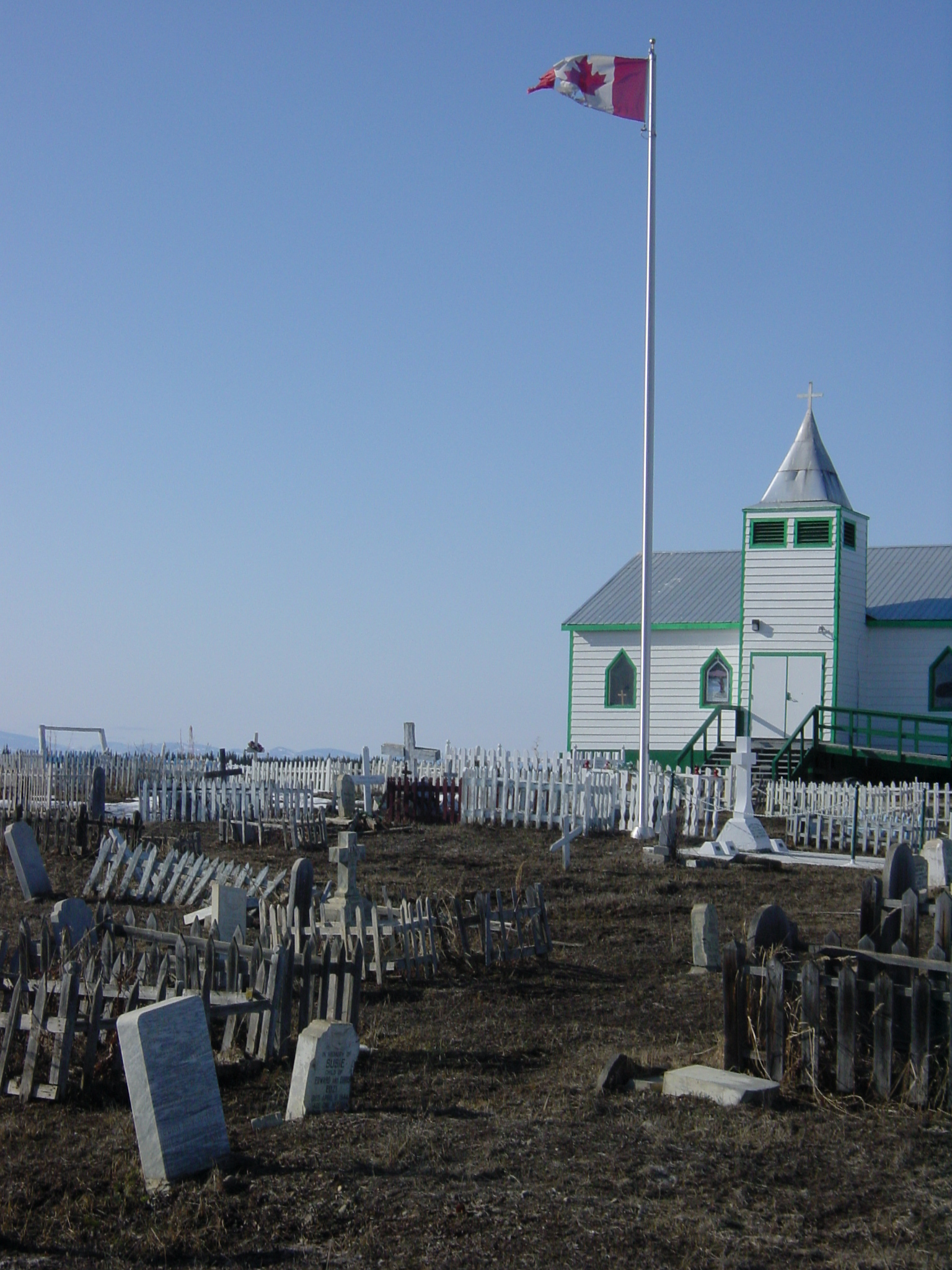
- A wooden church in Fort McPherson, NWT
- Motto: "Take what you need"
- Location within Northwest Territories Location within Canada
- Coordinates: 67°26′07″N 134°52′57″W
- Country: Canada
- Territory: Northwest Territories
- Region: Inuvik Region
- Electoral district: Mackenzie Delta
- Census division: Region 1
- Hamlet: 1 November 1986

Government
  - Mayor: Richard Nerysoo
  - Senior Administrative Officer: Susan Blake
  - MLA: Frederick Blake Jr.

Area (2021)
  - Land: 53.83 km^{2} (20.78 sq mi)
- Elevation: 43 m (141 ft)

Population (2021)
  - Total: 647
  - Density: 12/km^{2} (31/sq mi)
- Time zone: UTC−06:00 (Northwest Territories Time)
- Postal code: X0E 0J0
- Area code: 867
- Telephone exchange: 952
- Living cost (2018): 162.5^{A}
- Food price index: 162.8^{B}
- Website: www.fortmcpherson.ca
- Sources: Department of Municipal and Community Affairs, Prince of Wales Northern Heritage Centre, Canada Flight Supplement^A2018 figure based on Edmonton = 100^B2019 figure based on Yellowknife = 100

National Historic Site of Canada
- Official name: Fort McPherson National Historic Site of Canada
- Designated: 1969

Fort McPherson (Gwichʼin: Teetłʼit Zheh [tʰeː.tɬʼɪtʰ ʒɛh], "at the head of the waters") is a hamlet located in the Inuvik Region of the Northwest Territories, Canada. It is located on the east bank of the Peel River and is 121 km (75 mi) south of Inuvik on the Dempster Highway.

The First Nations people who make up the majority are Gwichʼin (Teetłʼit Gwichʼin) and the two principal languages spoken are Gwichʼin and English. Originally the site of a Hudson's Bay Company post the community was named for Murdoch McPherson.

Most people have vehicles and regularly make trips to either Inuvik, or Whitehorse, Yukon.

== History ==
Fort McPherson was the starting point of Francis Joseph Fitzgerald's famous tragic journey of "The Lost Patrol". All four men on the Patrol, including Fitzgerald, were buried at Fort McPherson on 28 March 1911. In 1938, the graves were cemented over into one large tomb (to the right of the flag pole in above image), with cement posts at the four corners connected by a chain. In the centre is a memorial to the Royal Northwest Mounted Police Patrol of 1910.

== National Historic Site ==
In 1969, the area comprising the boundaries of the community of Fort McPherson, as it was mapped in 1898, was designated a National Historic Site of Canada, in recognition of the fact that the site had served as the principal Hudson's Bay Company trading post in the MacKenzie Delta region for over 50 years, and had been the first North-West Mounted Police post in the Western Arctic.

== Transportation ==
Fort McPherson is accessible by road all year from Dawson City and Whitehorse, Yukon, with the exception of spring break-up and fall freeze-up on the Peel River. The community also has access to Inuvik via the Dempster Highway and crosses the Mackenzie River at Tsiigehtchic.

There is also a small airport at Fort McPherson, Fort McPherson Airport, that has seasonal flights to Inuvik (Mike Zubko) Airport on Aklak Air when the road across the Peel is closed. The former Fort McPherson Water Aerodrome was listed as closed in the 15 March 2007 Canada Flight Supplement.

== Demographics ==
In the 2021 Canadian census conducted by Statistics Canada, Fort McPherson had a population of 647 living in 255 of its 318 total private dwellings, a change of −7.6% from its 2016 population of 700. With a land area of 53.83 km^{2} (20.78 sq mi), it had a population density of 12.0/km^{2} (31.1/sq mi) in 2021.

In the 2021 census 645 people identified as Indigenous, 560 as First Nations, 30 as Métis, 85 as Inuit or Inuvialuit, and 105 non-Indigenous.

Federal census population history of Fort McPherson
Year	Pop.	±%
1976	710	—
1981	623	−12.3%
1986	760	+22.0%
1991	759	−0.1%
1996	878	+15.7%
2001	773	−12.0%
2006	776	+0.4%
2011	792	+2.1%
2016	700	−11.6%
2021	647	−7.6%
Source: Statistics Canada

Annual population estimates

Year	Pop.	±%
1996	915	—
1997	887	−3.1%
1998	861	−2.9%
1999	861	+0.0%
2000	828	−3.8%
2001	832	+0.5%
2002	809	−2.8%
2003	820	+1.4%
2004	813	−0.9%
2005	814	+0.1%
2006	805	−1.1%
2007	809	+0.5%

Year	Pop.	±%
2008	801	−1.0%
2009	815	+1.7%
2010	805	−1.2%
2011	813	+1.0%
2012	810	−0.4%
2013	795	−1.9%
2014	791	−0.5%
2015	786	−0.6%
2016	795	+1.1%
2017	776	−2.4%
2018	672	−13.4%
2019	635	−5.5%

Sources: NWT Bureau of Statistics (2008 - 2019), NWT Bureau of Statistics (2001 - 2017)

== Climate ==
Fort McPherson experiences a subarctic climate (Köppen climate classification Dfc). The highest temperature ever recorded in Fort McPherson was 35.1 °C (95.2 °F) on 6 August 2024. The coldest temperature ever recorded was −55.6 °C (−68.1 °F) on 14 January 1894.

Climate data for Fort McPherson (Fort McPherson Airport) Climate ID: 2201601; coordinates 67°24′28″N 135°51′37″W; elevation: 35.4 m (116 ft); 1991–2020 normals, extremes 1892–present (Note: Climate data was recorded at Fort McPherson from October 1892 to June 1977 and at Fort McPherson Airport from August 1981 to present. Composite data from Fort McPherson A; Climate ID: 2201606; coordinates 67°24′25″N 135°31′35″W; elevation: 35.4 m (116 ft))
Month	Jan	Feb	Mar	Apr	May	Jun	Jul	Aug	Sep	Oct	Nov	Dec	Year
Record high humidex	9.0	7.6	11.5	15.7	28.3	38.8	35.0	40.4	27.0	24.1	5.0	4.6	40.4
Record high °C (°F)	6.1 (43.0)	10.0 (50.0)	11.8 (53.2)	16.7 (62.1)	29.5 (85.1)	32.0 (89.6)	33.3 (91.9)	33.0 (91.4)	27.2 (81.0)	24.1 (75.4)	10.0 (50.0)	9.0 (48.2)	33.3 (91.9)
Mean daily maximum °C (°F)	−23.2 (−9.8)	−21.0 (−5.8)	−14.0 (6.8)	−3.1 (26.4)	7.6 (45.7)	18.5 (65.3)	20.0 (68.0)	16.5 (61.7)	8.2 (46.8)	−3.3 (26.1)	−15.3 (4.5)	−21.4 (−6.5)	−2.5 (27.5)
Daily mean °C (°F)	−26.9 (−16.4)	−24.9 (−12.8)	−19.2 (−2.6)	−8.9 (16.0)	2.7 (36.9)	13.1 (55.6)	15.1 (59.2)	11.9 (53.4)	4.6 (40.3)	−6.6 (20.1)	−18.9 (−2.0)	−25.0 (−13.0)	−6.9 (19.6)
Mean daily minimum °C (°F)	−30.6 (−23.1)	−28.8 (−19.8)	−24.6 (−12.3)	−14.9 (5.2)	−2.4 (27.7)	7.7 (45.9)	10.2 (50.4)	7.3 (45.1)	1.1 (34.0)	−9.1 (15.6)	−22.3 (−8.1)	−28.8 (−19.8)	−11.3 (11.7)
Record low °C (°F)	−55.6 (−68.1)	−55.0 (−67.0)	−48.9 (−56.0)	−44.4 (−47.9)	−25.6 (−14.1)	−6.7 (19.9)	−1.1 (30.0)	−6.7 (19.9)	−19.5 (−3.1)	−37.5 (−35.5)	−46.7 (−52.1)	−50.6 (−59.1)	−55.6 (−68.1)
Record low wind chill	−58.9	−56.8	−54.4	−41.6	−32.6	−9.2	0.0	−4.8	−17.5	−40.2	−50.0	−59.7	−59.7
Average precipitation mm (inches)	13.6 (0.54)	12.8 (0.50)	13.2 (0.52)	8.1 (0.32)	14.1 (0.56)	27.8 (1.09)	48.6 (1.91)	38.2 (1.50)	38.7 (1.52)	34.8 (1.37)	27.3 (1.07)	17.0 (0.67)	294.3 (11.59)
Average rainfall mm (inches)	0.0 (0.0)	0.0 (0.0)	0.0 (0.0)	0.2 (0.01)	9.4 (0.37)	27.4 (1.08)	48.6 (1.91)	38.2 (1.50)	30.1 (1.19)	1.2 (0.05)	0.0 (0.0)	0.0 (0.0)	155.0 (6.10)
Average snowfall cm (inches)	13.6 (5.4)	12.8 (5.0)	13.2 (5.2)	7.9 (3.1)	4.7 (1.9)	0.2 (0.1)	0.0 (0.0)	0.1 (0.0)	8.1 (3.2)	33.7 (13.3)	27.3 (10.7)	17.0 (6.7)	138.7 (54.6)
Average precipitation days (≥ 0.2 mm)	5.5	4.7	6.0	3.7	5.2	7.1	10.7	11.2	12.1	10.7	8.7	6.8	92.5
Average rainy days (≥ 0.2 mm)	0.0	0.0	0.0	0.12	3.2	7.1	10.7	11.2	9.8	0.71	0.0	0.0	42.8
Average snowy days (≥ 0.2 cm)	5.5	4.7	6.0	3.6	2.0	0.12	0.0	0.05	2.6	10.1	8.7	6.8	50.2
Source: Environment and Climate Change Canada (January maximum / minimum) (February maximum / minimum) (March minimum) (April maximum / minimum) (May minimum) (June minimum) (July minimum) (August maximum / minimum) (September maximum) (November minimum) (December minimum)

== See also ==
- List of municipalities in the Northwest Territories
