= Fort McPherson Airport =

Airport in the Northwest Territories, Canada

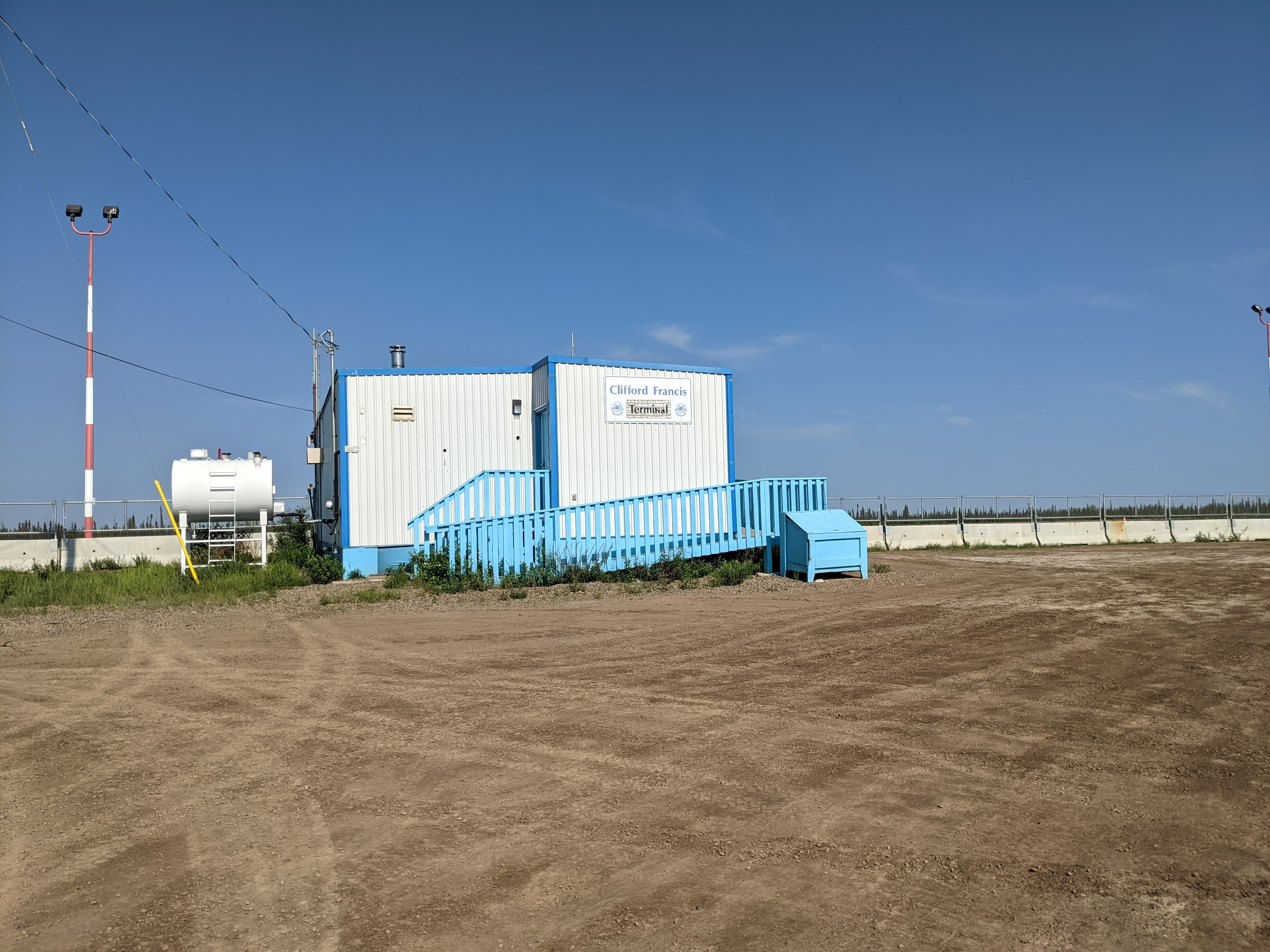
- IATA: ZFM; ICAO: CZFM

Summary
- Airport type: Public
- Operator: Government of the Northwest Territories
- Location: Fort McPherson, Northwest Territories
- Time zone: Northwest Territories Time (UTC−06:00)
- Elevation AMSL: 115 ft (35 m)
- Coordinates: 67°24′25″N 134°51′35″W

Map
- Location in the Northwest Territories

Runways
Direction	Length		Surface
Direction	ft	m	Surface
12/30	3,934	1,199	Gravel

Statistics (2010)
- Aircraft movements: 703
- Source: Canada Flight Supplement; Movements from Statistics Canada.

Fort McPherson Airport (IATA: ZFM, ICAO: CZFM) is located 2 nautical miles (3.7 km; 2.3 mi) south of Fort McPherson, Northwest Territories, Canada.

== Airlines and destinations ==
Airlines	Destinations
Kenn Borek Air operated by Aklak Air	Seasonal: Inuvik

== See also ==
- Fort McPherson Water Aerodrome
