= Paulatuk (Nora Aliqatchialuk Ruben) Airport =

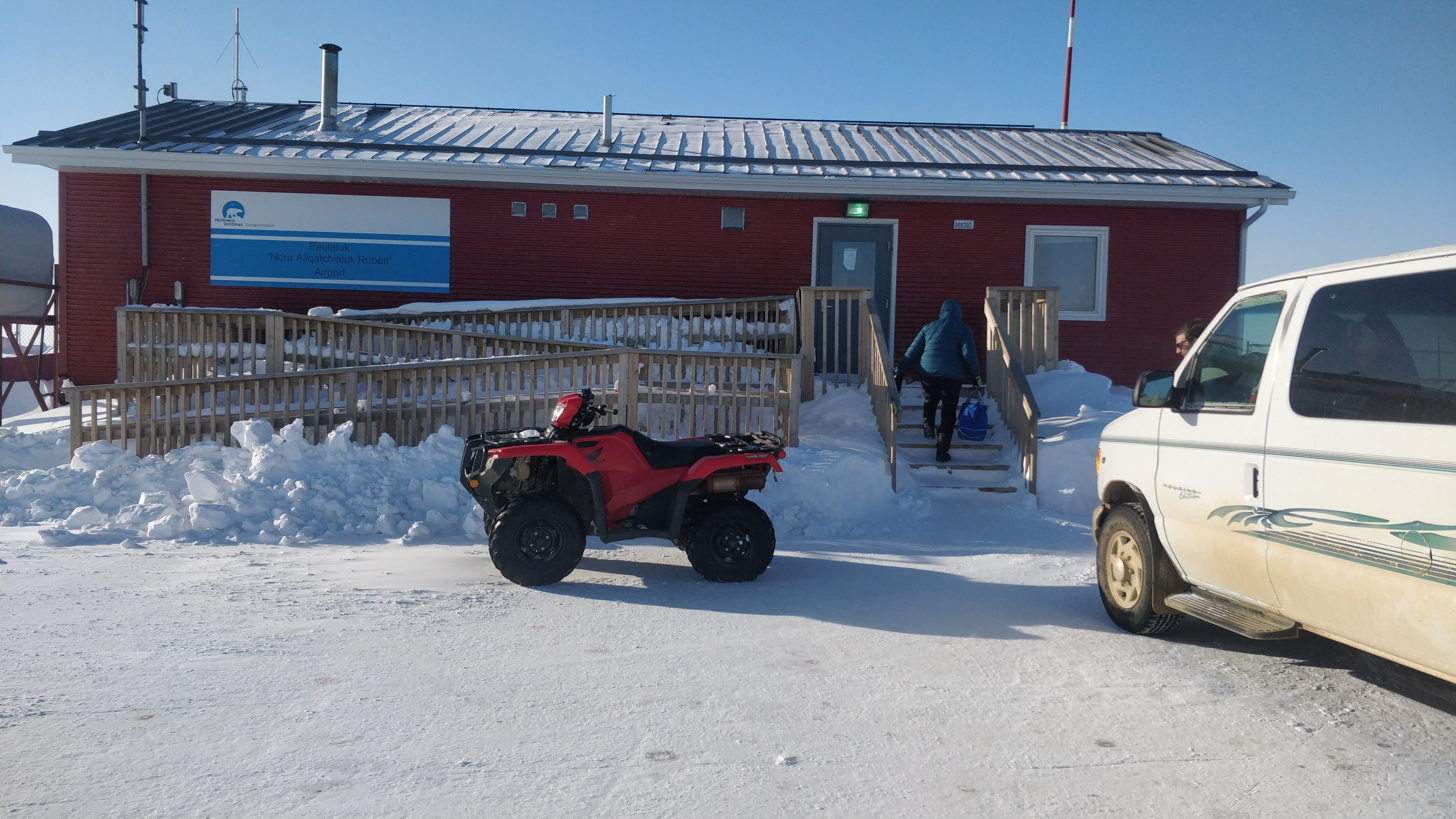
- Terminal building
- IATA: YPC; ICAO: CYPC; WMO: 71984

Summary
- Airport type: Public
- Operator: Government of the Northwest Territories
- Location: Paulatuk, Northwest Territories
- Time zone: Northwest Territories Time (UTC−06:00)
- Elevation AMSL: 15 ft (4.6 m)
- Coordinates: 69°21′38″N 124°04′33″W

Map
- Location in the Northwest Territories

Runways
Direction	Length		Surface
Direction	ft	m	Surface
02/20	4,003	1,220	Gravel

Statistics (2010)
- Aircraft movements: 1,385
- Sources: Canada Flight Supplement; Environment Canada; Movements from Statistics Canada.

Paulatuk (Nora Aliqatchialuk Ruben) Airport (IATA: YPC, ICAO: CYPC) is located near Paulatuk, Northwest Territories, Canada. Nav Canada reports that subsidence, turbulence and cross-winds may be encountered when landing here.

The airport is named for Nora Aliqatchialuk Ruben who was the first ticket agent at the airport. As of March 2011 it was the only Canadian airport to be named after a woman.

== Airlines and destinations ==
Airlines	Destinations
Kenn Borek Air operated by Aklak Air	Inuvik

== See also ==
- Paulatuk Water Aerodrome
