= Aklavik/Freddie Carmichael Airport =

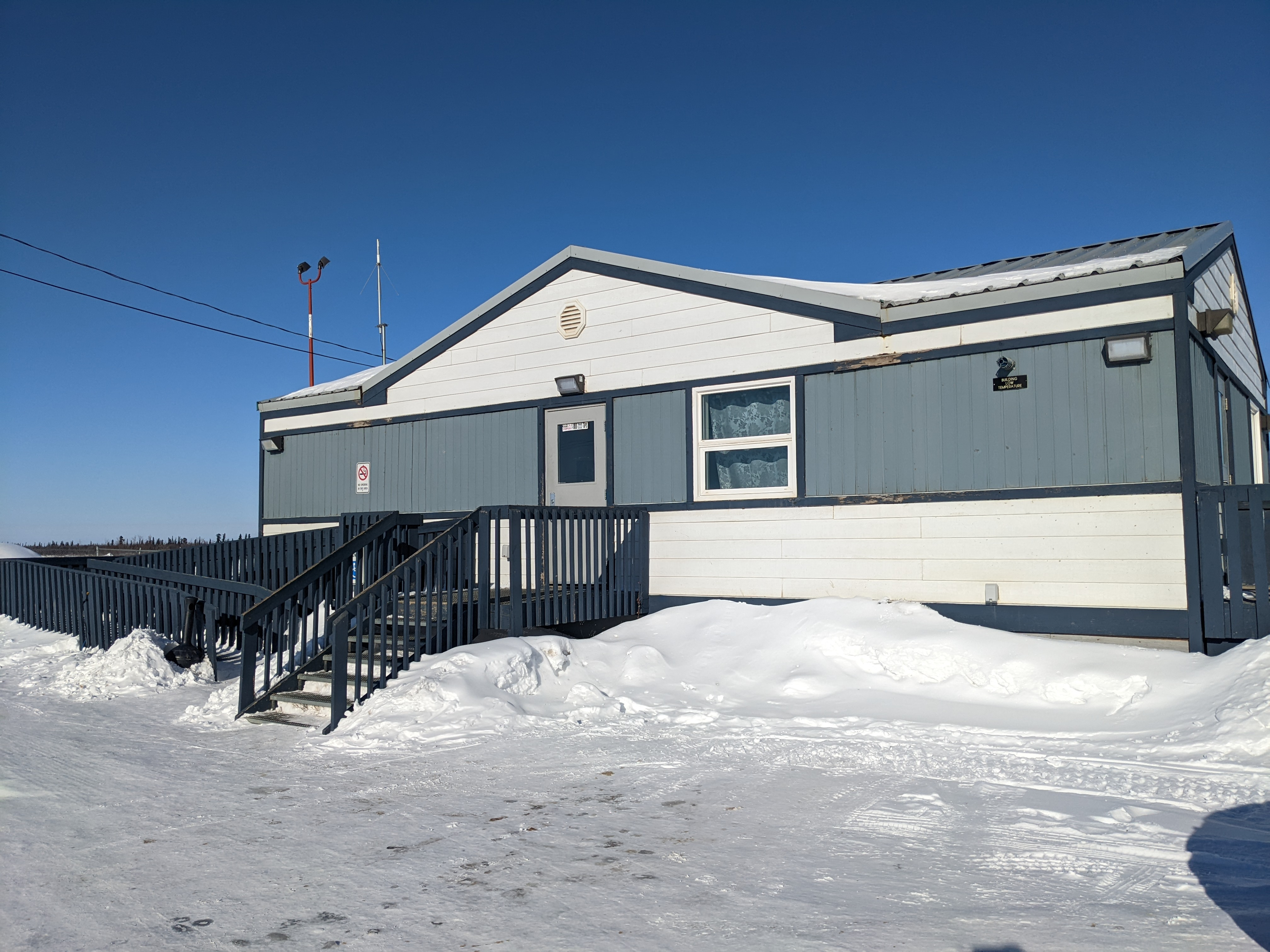
- IATA: LAK; ICAO: CYKD

Summary
- Airport type: Public
- Operator: Government of the Northwest Territories
- Location: Aklavik, NT
- Time zone: Northwest Territories Time (UTC−06:00)
- Elevation AMSL: 21 ft (6.4 m)
- Coordinates: 68°13′24″N 135°00′20″W

Map
- Location in the Northwest Territories CYKD (Canada)

Runways
Direction	Length		Surface
Direction	ft	m	Surface
14/32	3,002	915	Gravel

Statistics (2016-2018)
- Aircraft movements (annual avg.): 1,243
- Source: Canada Flight Supplement; Movements from Statistics Canada

Aklavik/Freddie Carmichael Airport (IATA: LAK, ICAO: CYKD) is located adjacent to Aklavik, Northwest Territories, Canada. The aerodrome is built on the banks of the Peel Channel of the Mackenzie River delta. Aklavik was the regional centre but was prone to flooding.

In 1959, Inuvik was purposely built to house a larger airport, highway connections, new health facilities, housing and an innovative public utilidor system. Aklavik remains a small traditional village that retains its connections to the land and river.

== Airlines and destinations ==
Airlines	Destinations
North-Wright Airways	Seasonal: Inuvik

== See also ==
- Aklavik Water Aerodrome
