= Masik River =

River on Banks Island, Northwest Territories, Canada

- Location within Canada

Location
- Country: Canada
- Territory: Northwest Territories

Physical characteristics
- Source
  - location: Banks Island
- Mouth
  - location: Beaufort Sea
  - coordinates: 71°31′49″N 123°47′23″W
  - elevation: 0 ft (0 m)

The Masik River is a river on Banks Island, in Canada's Northwest Territories. It is a part of the Arctic Ocean watershed.

The river is named after the polar researcher August Masik (1887–1976).

== See also ==
- List of rivers of Canada
- List of rivers of the Americas by coastline
