= Inuvik (Mike Zubko) Airport =

Airport in the Northwest Territories, Canada

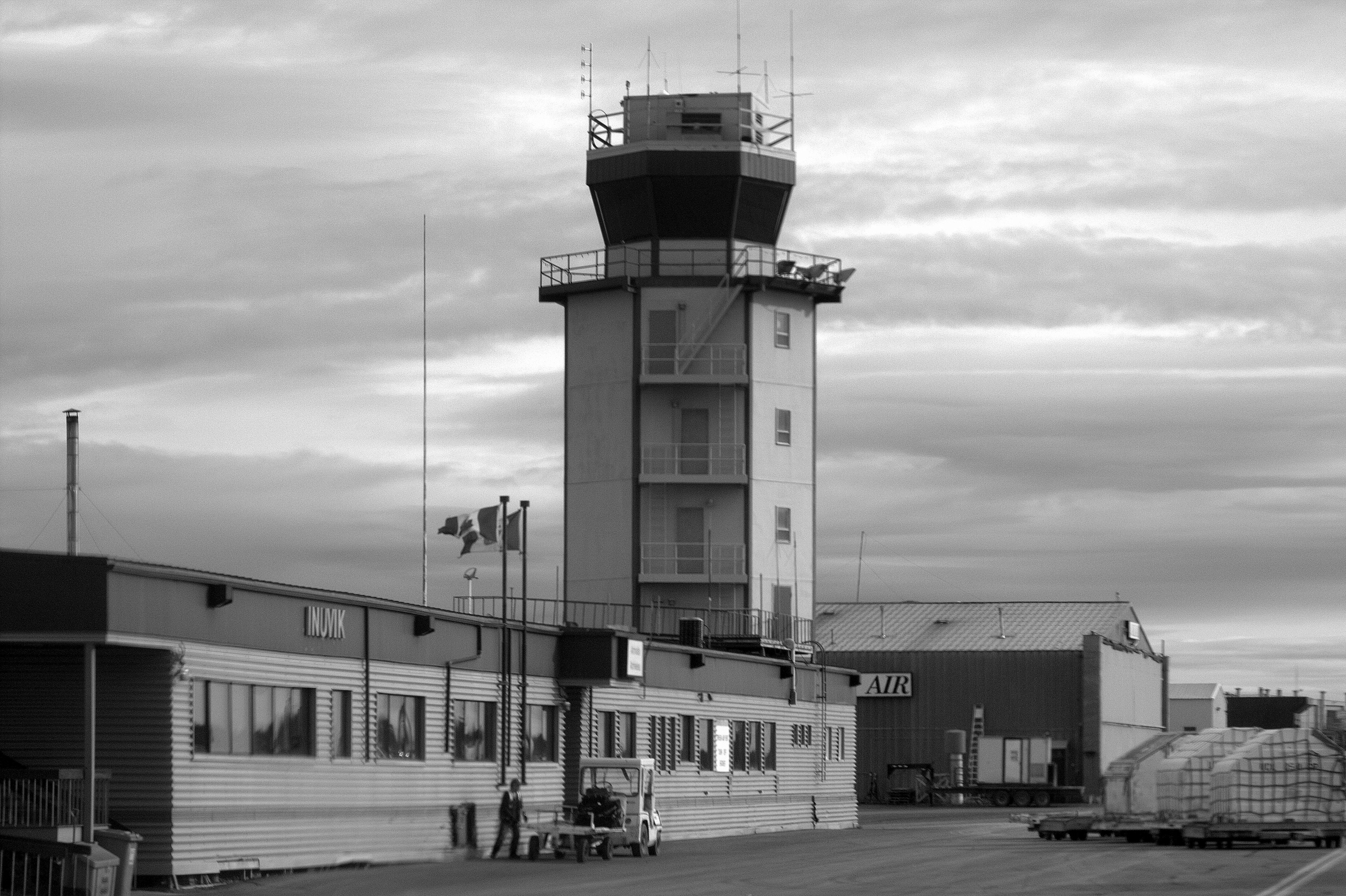
- IATA: YEV; ICAO: CYEV; WMO: 71364

Summary
- Airport type: Public
- Operator: Government of Northwest Territories
- Location: Inuvik, Northwest Territories
- Time zone: Northwest Territories Time (UTC−06:00)
- Elevation AMSL: 223 ft (68 m)
- Coordinates: 68°18′14″N 133°28′59″W

Map
- Location in the Northwest Territories CYEV (Canada)

Runways
Direction	Length		Surface
Direction	ft	m	Surface
06/24	6,006	1,831	Asphalt

Statistics (2010)
- Aircraft movements: 15,015
- Sources: Canada Flight Supplement; Environment Canada; Movements from Statistics Canada

Inuvik (Mike Zubko) Airport (IATA: YEV, ICAO: CYEV) is located 6.5 nautical miles (12.0 km; 7.5 mi) east of Inuvik, Northwest Territories, Canada.

The airport is classified as an airport of entry by Nav Canada and is staffed by the Canada Border Services Agency (CBSA). CBSA officers at this airport can handle general aviation aircraft only, with no more than 15 passengers.

It is also used as a forward operating base for CF-18 Hornet military jets operated by the Royal Canadian Air Force.

In 2019, the federal government announced a $150 million funding to extend the runway by an additional 3000 ft to a total length of 9000 ft and modernize the lighting, navigation and military aircraft landing systems at the airport.

In 1995, the airport was named for Polish-Canadian aviator Mike Zubko (1923–1991).

== Airlines and destinations ==
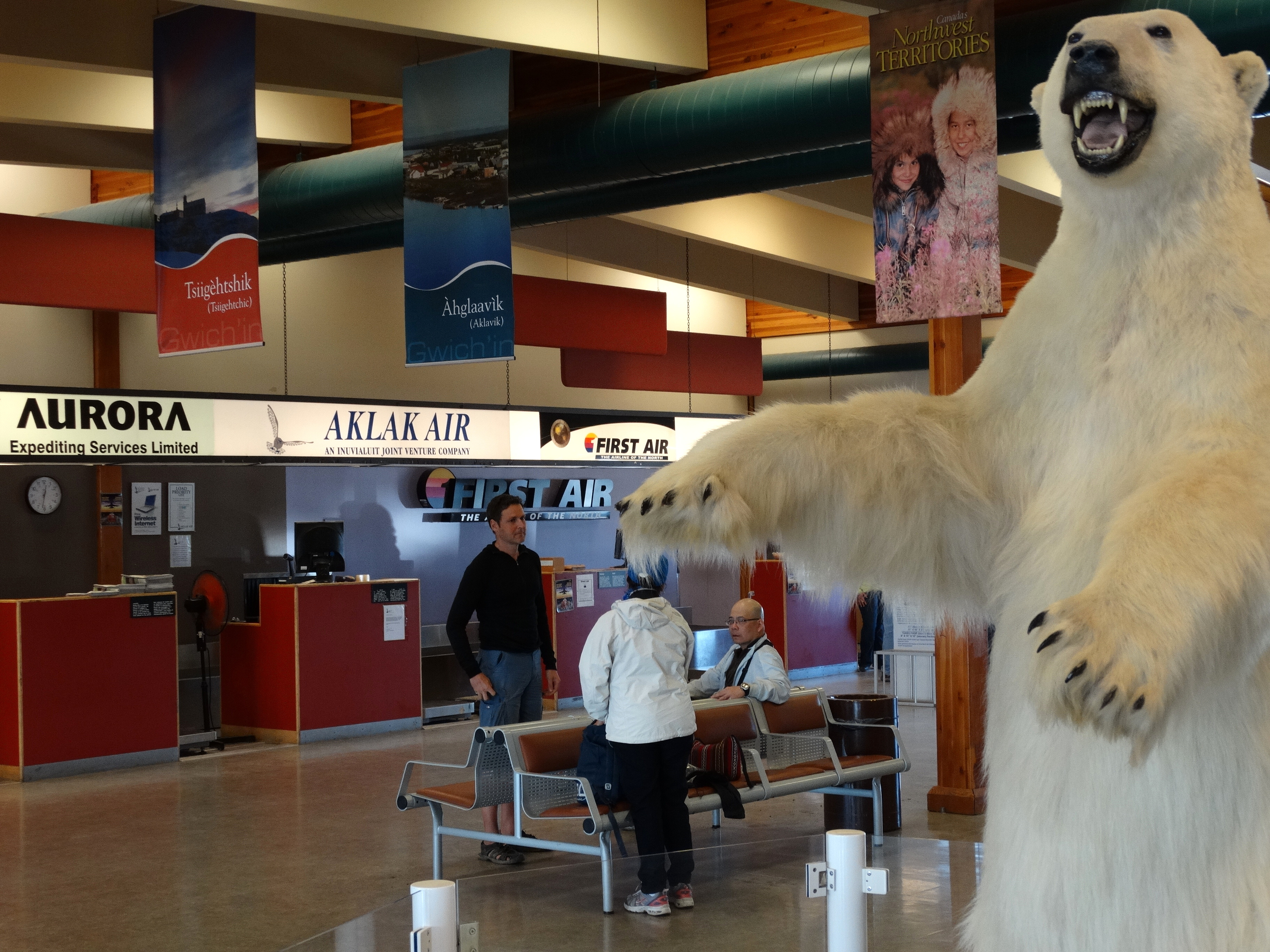
Check-in area for Inuvik Airport

Airlines	Destinations
Air North	Dawson City, Old Crow, Whitehorse
Canadian North	Norman Wells, Yellowknife
Kenn Borek Air operated by Aklak Air	Paulatuk, Sachs Harbour, Ulukhaktok; Seasonal: Fort McPherson; Charter: Aklavik
North-Wright Airways	Fort Good Hope, Norman Wells; Seasonal: Aklavik

Inuvik has scheduled jet airline service provided by Canadian North using Boeing 737-300 jetliners.

== Accidents and incidents ==
- On 4 November 2010, a hangar fire destroyed three aircraft owned by Kenn Borek Air and operated by Aklak Air. They were de Havilland Canada DHC-6 Twin Otter C-GZVH, Beechcraft King Air C-GHOC and Beechcraft 99 C-GKKB.

== See also ==
- Inuvik/Shell Lake Water Aerodrome
