= Ulukhaktok Airport =

Airport in the Northwest Territories, Canada

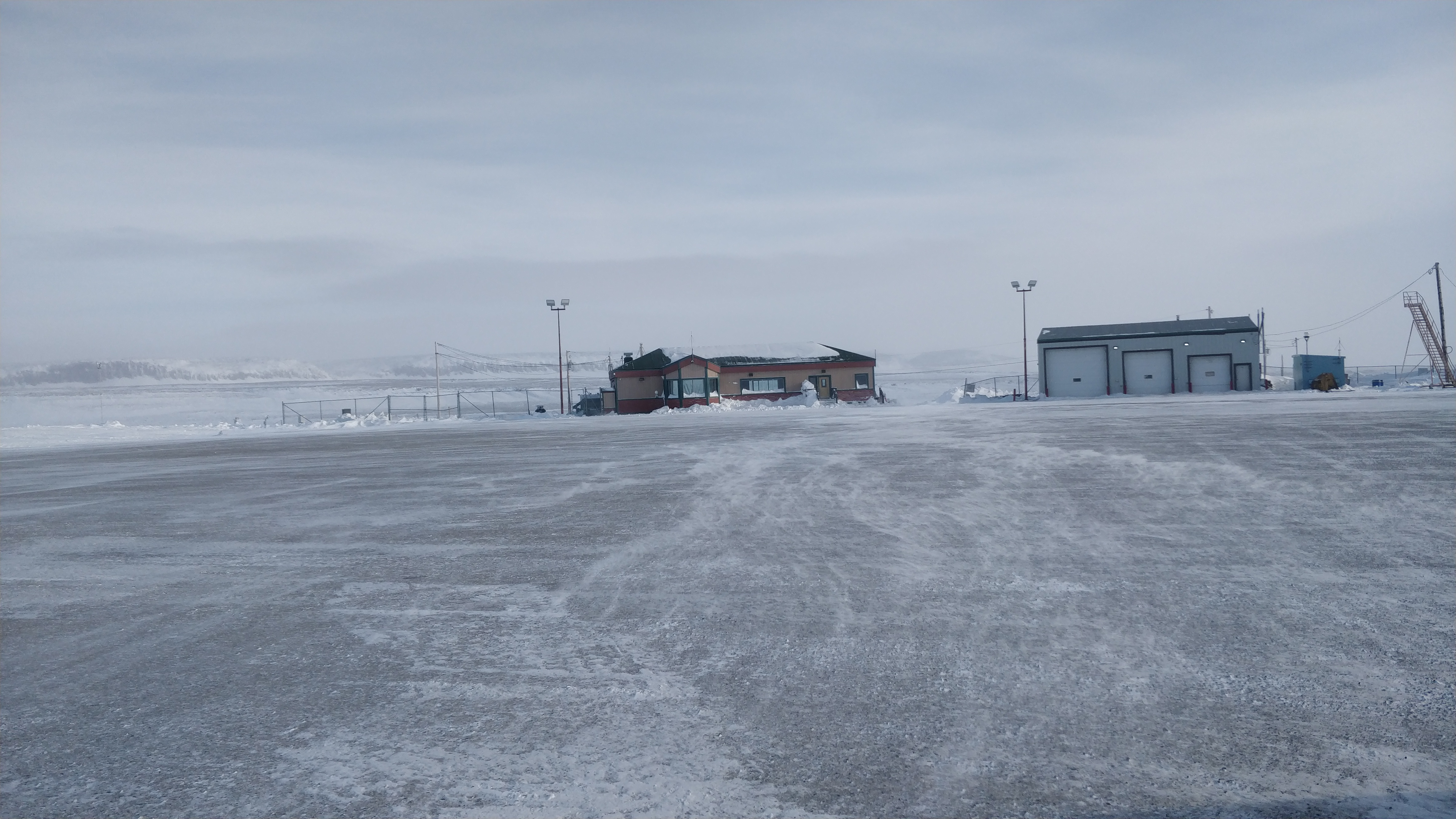
- IATA: YHI; ICAO: CYHI

Summary
- Airport type: Public
- Operator: Government of Northwest Territories
- Location: Ulukhaktok, Northwest Territories
- Time zone: Northwest Territories Time (UTC−06:00)
- Elevation AMSL: 118 ft (36 m)
- Coordinates: 70°45′46″N 117°48′22″W

Map
- Location in the Northwest Territories CYHI (Canada)

Runways
Direction	Length		Surface
Direction	ft	m	Surface
06/24	4,300	1,311	Gravel

Statistics (2009)
- Aircraft movements: 1,000
- Source: Canada Flight Supplement; Movements from Statistics Canada.

Ulukhaktok Airport, located at Ulukhaktok, Northwest Territories, Canada (IATA: YHI, ICAO: CYHI) was fully opened in December 1978 with the start of the Community Aerodrome Radio Station (CARS). However, aircraft had been using the runway prior to that as construction was completed in the summer of 1978.

The airport is 2 nautical miles (3.7 km; 2.3 mi) north of the town and a road was built to allow access from the community, which also included a short bridge to span the Okpilik River.

== Early years ==
Prior to the construction of the airport all aircraft either landed on an ice strip in the winter or in the middle of town. The old runway ran from the shore of "Jacks Bay" to the centre of the community. Besides limiting the size of the aircraft, Douglas DC-3 or De Havilland Canada Dash 7, able to land it also was a potentially dangerous situation. The only advantages were the fact that freight could be unloaded very easily and MEDIVAC aircraft could park right outside the nursing station. In the late winter, early spring a bulldozer would be used to create a runway on the ice that could be used by larger aircraft such as the C-130 Hercules.

== General ==
The original buildings at the airport included a two-story airport terminal, an emergency power generator building and the aircraft refueling station. The terminal has since been replaced and a three-bay garage to house the maintenance vehicles has been added. At the time of construction the non-directional beacon (NDB) and control building were left just south of the community. The NDB was later moved (approximately 1981) to its present location at the airport. At the same time the control building was relocated to the airport.

The runway is the standard gravel strip that is seen in most Canadian Arctic communities and is 4,300 by 100 ft (1,311 by 30 m) with the centre 117 ft (36 m) above sea level (ASL). Due to a slight hump in the land it is not possible to see one end of the runway from the other. The taxiway was originally 50 ft (15 m) wide; however, this had to be widened, to 75 ft (23 m) later to accommodate the four-engined Lockheed Electra.

Lighting consists of:

- Runway identification lights of the uni-directional flashing strobe type
- Red/green threshold/runway end lights
- Medium intensity (three settings) runway edge lights
- Precision Approach Path Indicator (PAPI) lights, type P1 for aircraft with eye to wheel height of up to 10 ft (3.0 m)

There is also a Type K ARCAL (Aircraft Radio Control of Aerodrome Lighting) system. However, the PAPI are not available with this system and can only be operated manually by a person at the airport.

Currently the only fuel available is turbine kerosene (Type JET A) and it is provided by a local contractor. METAR weather services are provided on a limited basis locally and a call out can be arranged for weather at other times. The radio station operates the same hours as the weather service and is in fact the same person. They use the standard CARS mandatory frequency of 122.1 MHz and they also monitor the emergency frequency of 121.5 MHz. The CARS also monitor the NDB which broadcasts the morse code identification "HI" on 361 kHz.

== Problems ==
During the initial planning stages community consultation was held and a major concern was expressed over the runway headings. The new runway was to be almost 90° from the old runway and some people felt that the prevailing winds would cause flights to be cancelled due to high crosswinds. However, this was not too much of a problem as the hills around the community funnelled the winds almost directly down the runway.

When the airport was originally constructed there was no provision for dedicated maintenance vehicles and they had to be shared with the community. This meant that after a blizzard the bulldozer and grader had just enough time to clear the road and runway before they had to return to town. This left the runway with 6 ft (1.8 m) high snow banks on either side, which caused the runway to fill in quickly with snow due to the almost constant winds that blow in the arctic. This then resulted in a high cost snow removal operation. The maintenance equipment would be run for almost 24 hours as a team of operators would push the snow back from the runway. After a few years a snow blower and plow-truck were purchased and a garage built to house them.

== Runway construction ==
Construction of the runway and associated facilities had begun in 1976 by Fred H. Ross & Associates (now Kitnuna Corporation) of Cambridge Bay, Nunavut.

Gravel for the runway was obtained from the north bank of the Okpilik River and the area was left untouched. This became known as the "sand-pit" and is used frequently in the summer months as a race track for 2, 3 and 4 wheel motorcycles.

Due to the situation of the airport, the community and the surrounding hills there is a "wind line" about halfway to the airport. The funnelling effect of the hills may cause the airport to be in a blizzard while the community is enjoying clear weather or vice versa.

By early 1979 the snow problem was so great that the runway was no longer a straight line. There was a slight curve in it that was quickly removed after an aircraft caught its wing on the snow bank that resulted in Holman Airport's first accident (no injuries).

== Airlines and destinations ==
Airlines	Destinations
Canadian North	Kugluktuk, Yellowknife
Kenn Borek Air operated by Aklak Air	Inuvik
