= Sachs Harbour =

Sachs Harbour Ikaahuk (Inuinnaqtun)
- Hamlet
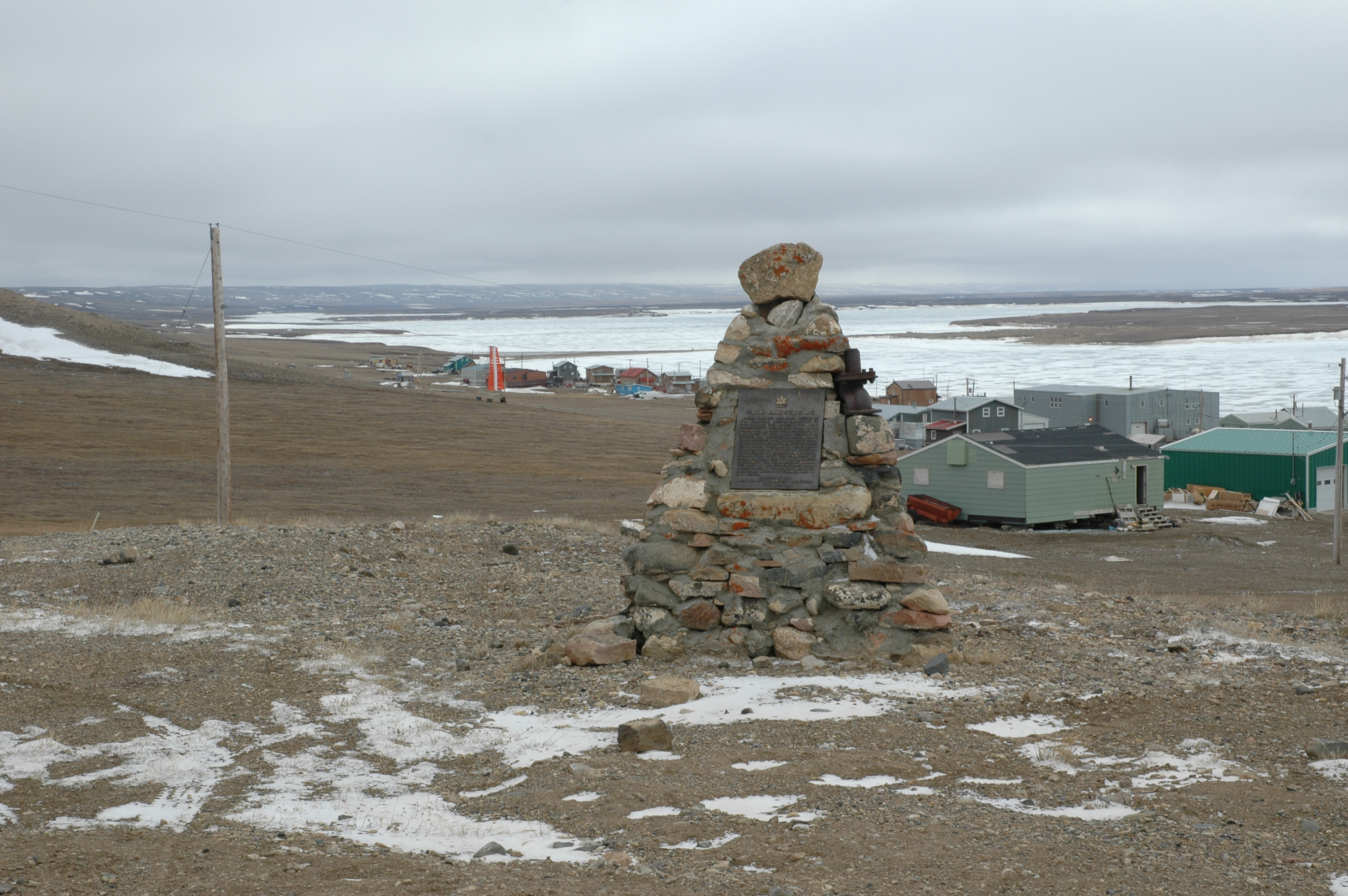

- Location within Northwest Territories Location within Canada
- Coordinates: 71°59′12″N 125°15′02″W
- Country: Canada
- Territory: Northwest Territories
- Region: Inuvik Region
- Electoral district: Nunakput
- Census division: Region 1
- First permanent settlement: 1929
- Incorporated (hamlet): 1 April 1986

Government
  - Mayor: Donna Keogak
  - Senior Administrative Officer: Betty Haogak
  - MLA: Lucy Kuptana

Area
  - Land: 272.22 km^{2} (105.10 sq mi)
- Elevation: 86 m (282 ft)

Population (2021)
  - Total: 104
  - Density: 0.4/km^{2} (1.0/sq mi)
- Time zone: UTC−06:00 (Northwest Territories Time)
- Postal code: X0E 0Z0
- Area code: 867
- Telephone exchange: 690
- Living cost: 192.5^{A}
- Food price index (2019): 197.4^{B}
- Sources: Department of Municipal and Community Affairs, Prince of Wales Northern Heritage Centre, Canada Flight Supplement^A2018 figure based on Edmonton = 100^B2019 figure based on Yellowknife = 100

Sachs Harbour (/sæks/ SAKS; Inuinnaqtun: Ikaahuk) is a hamlet in the Inuvik Region of the Northwest Territories, Canada. Situated on the southwestern coast of Banks Island in the Inuvialuit Settlement Region, the population according to the 2021 census count was 104 people. Sachs Harbour is the only permanent settlement on Banks Island.

== Etymology ==
The town was named after the ship Mary Sachs, who was part of the Canadian Arctic Expedition, 1913–1916. The traditional name for the area is Ikaahuk, meaning "place where one crosses".

== History ==
Pre-Dorset cultural sites on the island have been found that date from approximately 1500 BCE. The pre-Dorset sites were later replaced by archaeological cultures showing Eastern and Western Arctic Dorset characteristics in the southern parts of the island. From c. 800 BCE to 1000 CE, the northern half of Banks Island was seldom visited by people. From 1000 to 1450 Thule people occupied several sites along the island, but due to the cooling climate brought on by the Little Ice Age, the island was most likely deserted until the arrival of the Inuvialuit in the 17th century.

The island on which Sachs Harbour is located was first spotted in 1820 by Sir William Edward Parry and named "Banks Land" in honour of Sir Joseph Banks. The origins of the settlement go back to 1929 when several Inuit families moved to the site to trap. It was incorporated as a hamlet in 1986.

On the north shore of Banks Island within Aulavik National Park is a narrow bay, Mercy Bay, penetrating some distance into the park. It is of historical significance for the Investigator, one of a number of ships sent out to the Arctic by the Admiralty to find the lost expedition of John Franklin. The Investigator, captained by Commander Robert McClure, became trapped in the ice in the bay for some three years and had to be abandoned by its crew. The Investigator sailed from England South America so that it passed through the Bering Strait in an attempt to find the Northwest Passage from the west while looking for Franklin's lost expedition.

== Economy ==
The community's economy is based largely on hunting and trapping, but tourism also plays a small role. Most of the town lies within 230 m (250 yd) of the shoreline. Residents engage in ice fishing, harvesting fish from the Amundsen Gulf and the Beaufort Sea. There is a goose hunt every spring. The community is also home to the largest commercial muskox harvests in Canada.

Oil and gas exploration has provided jobs over the years for some Sachs Harbour residents — estimates of commercially recoverable oil in the Beaufort Sea range from 640×10^{6} to 1,910×10^{6} m^{3} (4 to 12 Gbbl), and there is believed to be between 370×10^{9} and 1,780×10^{9} m^{3} (13×10^{12} and 63×10^{12} cu ft) of natural gas.

=== Aulavik National Park ===
Sachs Harbour is the headquarters of Aulavik National Park and the Visitor Reception Centre is situated in Sachs Harbour. Aulavik National Park is located on the north end of Banks Island, and is co-operatively managed by Parks Canada with the residents of Sachs Harbour and the broader Inuvialuit community. The Visitor Reception Centre presents the park and Inuvialuit culture to visitors to Banks Island, as well as serves as a centre for community activities.

== Demographics ==
In the 2021 Canadian census conducted by Statistics Canada, Sachs Harbour had a population of 104 living in 38 of its 52 total private dwellings, a change of 1% from its 2016 population of 103. With a land area of 272.22 km^{2} (105.10 sq mi), it had a population density of 0.4/km^{2} (1.0/sq mi) in 2021.

Federal census population history of Sachs Harbour
Year	Pop.	±%
1976	163	—
1981	161	−1.2%
1986	158	−1.9%
1991	125	−20.9%
1996	135	+8.0%
2001	114	−15.6%
2006	122	+7.0%
2011	112	−8.2%
2016	103	−8.0%
2021	104	+1.0%
Source: Statistics Canada

Annual population estimates

Year	Pop.	±%
1996	140	—
1997	150	+7.1%
1998	149	−0.7%
1999	138	−7.4%
2000	127	−8.0%
2001	125	−1.6%
2002	118	−5.6%
2003	113	−4.2%
2004	121	+7.1%
2005	122	+0.8%
2006	127	+4.1%
2007	123	−3.1%
2008	124	+0.8%
2009	131	+5.6%
2010	126	−3.8%

Year	Pop.	±%
2011	115	−8.7%
2012	117	+1.7%
2013	122	+4.3%
2014	121	−0.8%
2015	112	−7.4%
2016	112	+0.0%
2017	111	−0.9%
2018	111	+0.0%
2019	113	+1.8%
2020	112	−0.9%
2021	115	+2.7%
2022	110	−4.3%
2023	113	+2.7%
2024	111	−1.8%

Sources: NWT Bureau of Statistics (2001 - 2024)

At the 2021 census the main language was English with nobody reporting French. There were 30 people reported Inuktut as their mother tongue and of those 25 spoke Inuinnaqtun (Inuvialuktun) and the rest Inuktitut. Over 90% of the population in 2021 were Inuit (Inuvialuit) and no other Indigenous peoples were counted.

== Infrastructure ==
Services include a two-member Royal Canadian Mounted Police detachment and a health centre with one nurse. Phone services are provided by Northwestel with Internet access. The local hunters and trappers association provides outfitting for big-game hunts like muskox and polar bears. Bulk supplies of food and other items are brought by barge in the summer months and flights from Inuvik, some 523 km (325 mi) to the southwest, operate all year, via the Sachs Harbour (David Nasogaluak Jr. Saaryuaq) Airport.

Students are taught at Inualthuyak School for Grades K to 9.

== Geography ==
=== Climate ===
Sachs Harbour is in the Arctic tundra climatic zone (ET), characterized by long, cold winters. Since the activities of many residents of the community revolve around fishing, hunting, and travel, many residents have considerable knowledge of weather conditions, permafrost, and even erosion patterns.

Climate data for Sachs Harbour (Sachs Harbour (David Nasogaluak Jr. Saaryuaq) Airport} Climate ID: 2503650; coordinates 72°00′N 125°16′W; elevation: 86.3 m (283 ft); 1991–2020 normals, extremes 1955−present (Note: Composite data from Sachs Harbour A; Climate ID: 2503649; coordinates 72°59′37″N 125°14′29″W; elevation: 86.3 m (283 ft) and Sachs Harbour Climate; Climate ID: 2503648; coordinates 72°59′33″N 125°15′15″W; elevation: 87.5 m (287 ft). Sunshine from 1951–1980)
Month	Jan	Feb	Mar	Apr	May	Jun	Jul	Aug	Sep	Oct	Nov	Dec	Year
Record high humidex	15.0	−6.1	−3.2	2.6	9.4	22.1	31.9	26.0	15.9	3.9	1.1	−4.0	31.9
Record high °C (°F)	−4.4 (24.1)	−4.5 (23.9)	−3.2 (26.2)	5.4 (41.7)	10.0 (50.0)	20.5 (68.9)	24.2 (75.6)	23.2 (73.8)	15.6 (60.1)	4.4 (39.9)	1.7 (35.1)	−4.0 (24.8)	24.2 (75.6)
Mean daily maximum °C (°F)	−23.8 (−10.8)	−24.4 (−11.9)	−22.8 (−9.0)	−13.6 (7.5)	−3.6 (25.5)	6.3 (43.3)	9.8 (49.6)	7.2 (45.0)	1.5 (34.7)	−6.5 (20.3)	−15.3 (4.5)	−21.7 (−7.1)	−8.9 (16.0)
Daily mean °C (°F)	−27.4 (−17.3)	−27.8 (−18.0)	−26.4 (−15.5)	−17.2 (1.0)	−6.6 (20.1)	3.4 (38.1)	6.5 (43.7)	4.4 (39.9)	−0.6 (30.9)	−9.3 (15.3)	−18.6 (−1.5)	−25.1 (−13.2)	−12.1 (10.2)
Mean daily minimum °C (°F)	−31.0 (−23.8)	−31.2 (−24.2)	−29.9 (−21.8)	−20.8 (−5.4)	−9.4 (15.1)	0.4 (32.7)	3.3 (37.9)	1.5 (34.7)	−2.8 (27.0)	−12.2 (10.0)	−22.1 (−7.8)	−28.5 (−19.3)	−15.2 (4.6)
Record low °C (°F)	−52.2 (−62.0)	−50.2 (−58.4)	−48.4 (−55.1)	−43.0 (−45.4)	−26.7 (−16.1)	−16.5 (2.3)	−5.0 (23.0)	−11.0 (12.2)	−22.8 (−9.0)	−35.5 (−31.9)	−42.8 (−45.0)	−45.0 (−49.0)	−52.2 (−62.0)
Record low wind chill	−71.6	−68.1	−66.1	−58.4	−40.3	−22.1	−10.3	−16.0	−31.2	−44.9	−55.5	−64.1	−71.6
Average precipitation mm (inches)	5.8 (0.23)	5.3 (0.21)	8.5 (0.33)	9.4 (0.37)	6.7 (0.26)	9.4 (0.37)	14.2 (0.56)	25.5 (1.00)	21.2 (0.83)	17.7 (0.70)	9.5 (0.37)	6.6 (0.26)	139.7 (5.50)
Average rainfall mm (inches)	0.0 (0.0)	0.0 (0.0)	0.0 (0.0)	0.0 (0.0)	0.2 (0.01)	4.5 (0.18)	13.6 (0.54)	—	9.1 (0.36)	—	0.0 (0.0)	0.0 (0.0)	—
Average snowfall cm (inches)	6.0 (2.4)	6.5 (2.6)	—	7.7 (3.0)	—	2.2 (0.9)	0.3 (0.1)	3.1 (1.2)	10.6 (4.2)	—	—	—	—
Average precipitation days (≥ 0.2 mm)	8.9	6.2	8.7	7.5	7.9	5.7	7.7	13.8	13.7	14.3	11.2	7.8	113.2
Average rainy days (≥ 0.2 mm)	0.0	0.0	0.0	0.0	0.4	3.1	6.8	—	5.6	—	0.0	0.0	—
Average snowy days (≥ 0.2 cm)	8.2	6.2	—	6.2	—	1.4	0.4	3.0	7.4	—	—	—	—
Average relative humidity (%) (at 1500 LST)	78.4	77.3	79.1	82.2	83.4	80.6	78.2	84.3	87.2	89.5	85.4	80.7	82.2
Mean monthly sunshine hours	0.1	42.6	165.8	264.8	284.6	330.6	335.7	189.8	79.7	38.7	4.3	0.0	1,736.7
Source: Environment and Climate Change Canada Canadian Climate Normals 1991-2020 (sunshine)

=== Flora and fauna ===
Banks Island is home to the largest goose colony in North America. Three quarters of the world's population of muskoxen roam the island. Barren-ground caribou and polar bear are also seen on the island. On 26 April 2006, the world's first documented wild-born grizzly–polar bear hybrid was shot near the town.

Since the climate has been changing, sea ice has been breaking up earlier than normal, taking seals farther south in the summer. Seals are one of the main sources of food for the town. Sockeye and pink salmon appeared for the first time in nearby waters between 1999 and 2001. New species of birds are migrating to the island, including robins and barn swallows, and more flies and mosquitos have been appearing.

== Gallery ==
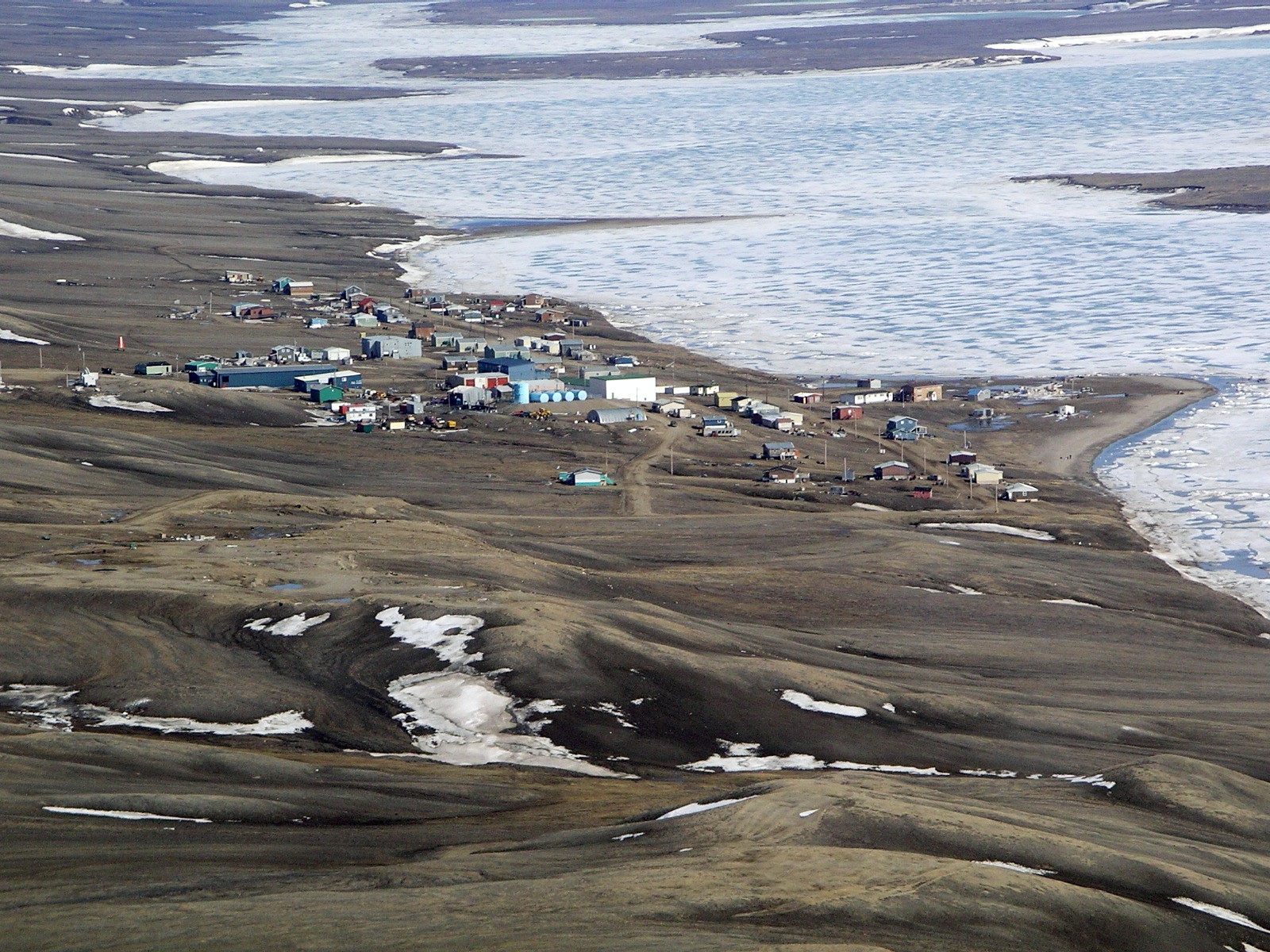
Located on the southern shores of Banks Island

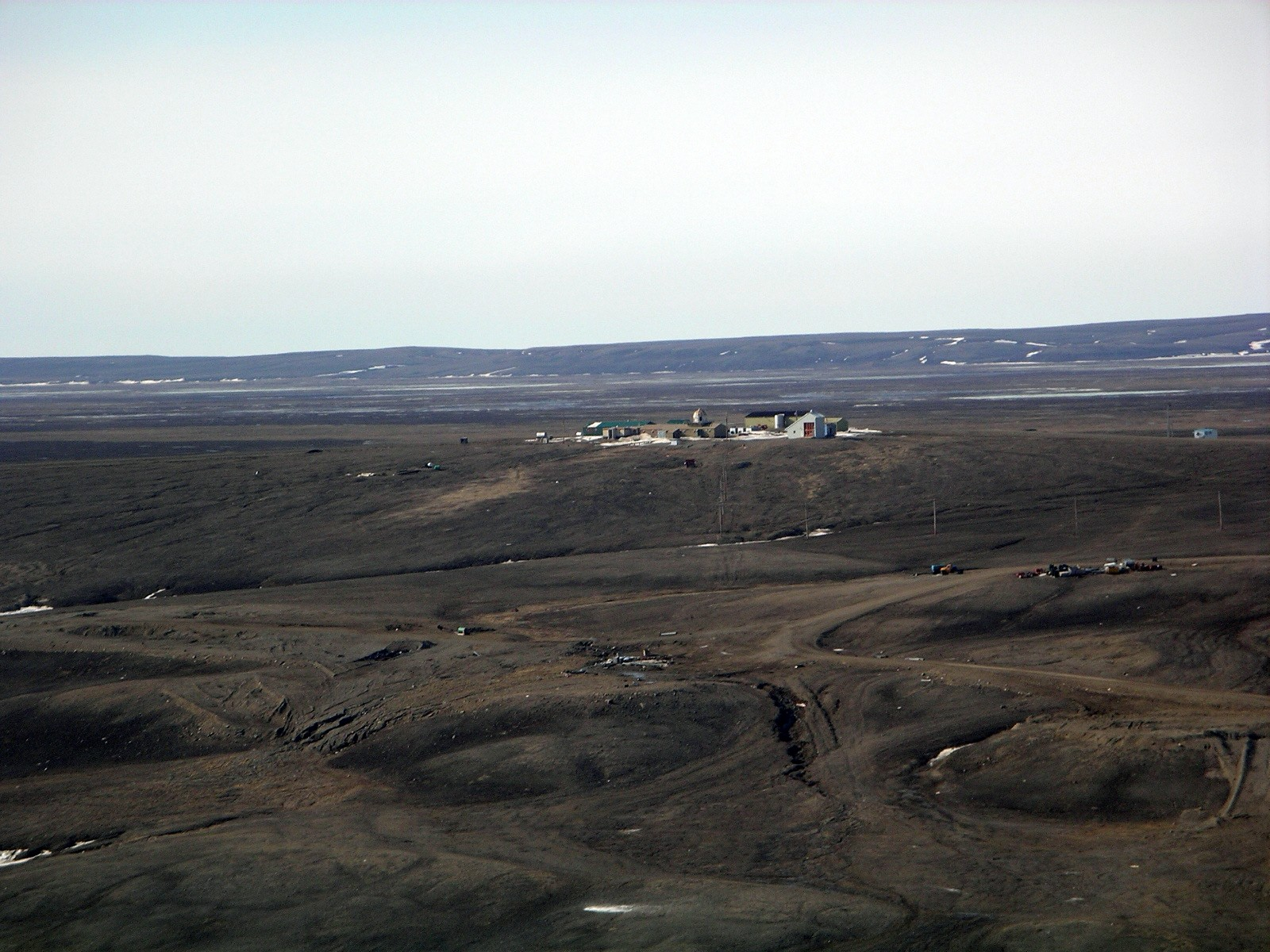
This site was closed and abandoned years ago

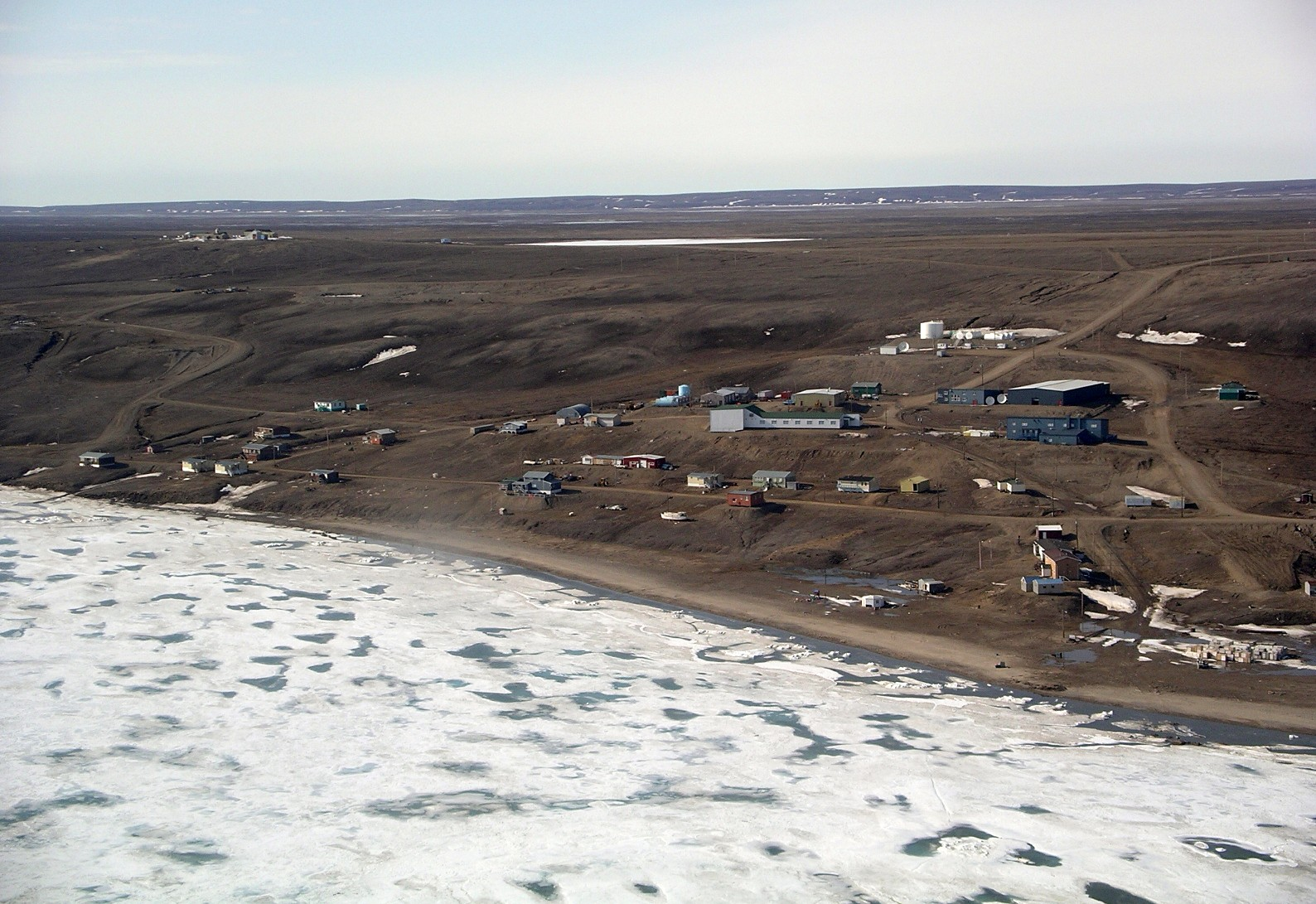
Sachs Harbour's population has been declining and now has approximately 104 residents

== See also ==
- List of municipalities in the Northwest Territories
- Thesiger Bay
